= Oiselay-et-Grachaux =

- Commune
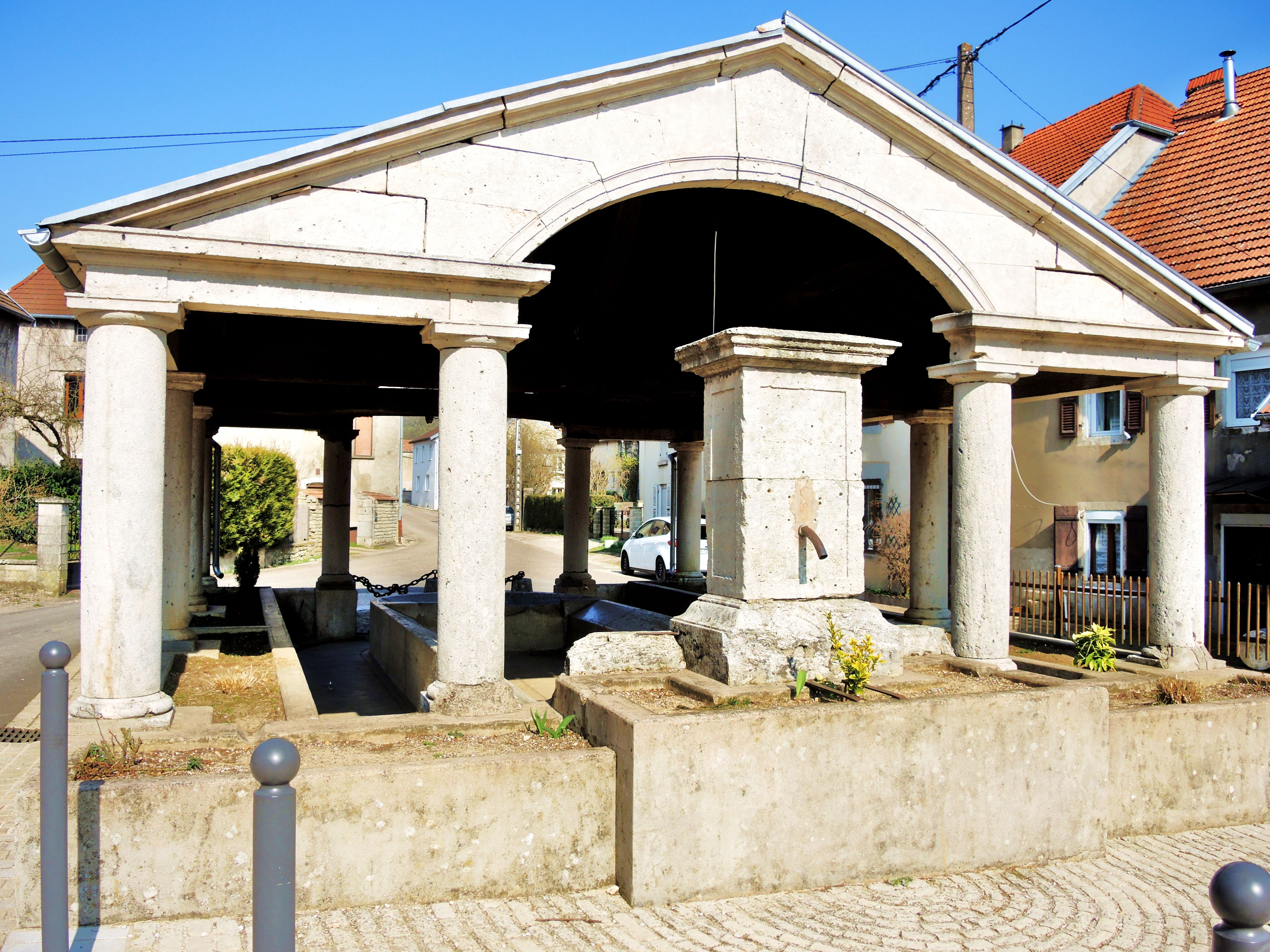
- The wash house in Oiselay

- Coat of arms
- Location of Oiselay-et-Grachaux
- Location within France Location within Bourgogne-Franche-Comté
- Coordinates: 47°25′20″N 5°56′03″E
- Country: France
- Region: Bourgogne-Franche-Comté
- Department: Haute-Saône
- Arrondissement: Vesoul
- Canton: Scey-sur-Saône-et-Saint-Albin

Government
  - Mayor (2020–2026): Christelle Cuenot
- Area^{1}: 22.99 km^{2} (8.88 sq mi)
- Highest elevation: 432 m (1,417 ft)
- Lowest elevation: 254 m (833 ft)
- Population (2023): 437
  - Density: 19.0/km^{2} (49.2/sq mi)
- Time zone: UTC+01:00 (CET)
  - Summer (DST): UTC+02:00 (CEST)
- INSEE/Postal code: 70393 /70700
- ^{1} French Land Register data, which excludes lakes, ponds, glaciers > 1 km^{2} (0.386 sq mi or 247 acres) and river estuaries.

Oiselay-et-Grachaux (French pronunciation: [wazlɛ e ɡʁaʃo]) is a commune in the Haute-Saône department in the region of Bourgogne-Franche-Comté in eastern France.

== See also ==
- Communes of the Haute-Saône department
