= Soing-Cubry-Charentenay =

- Commune
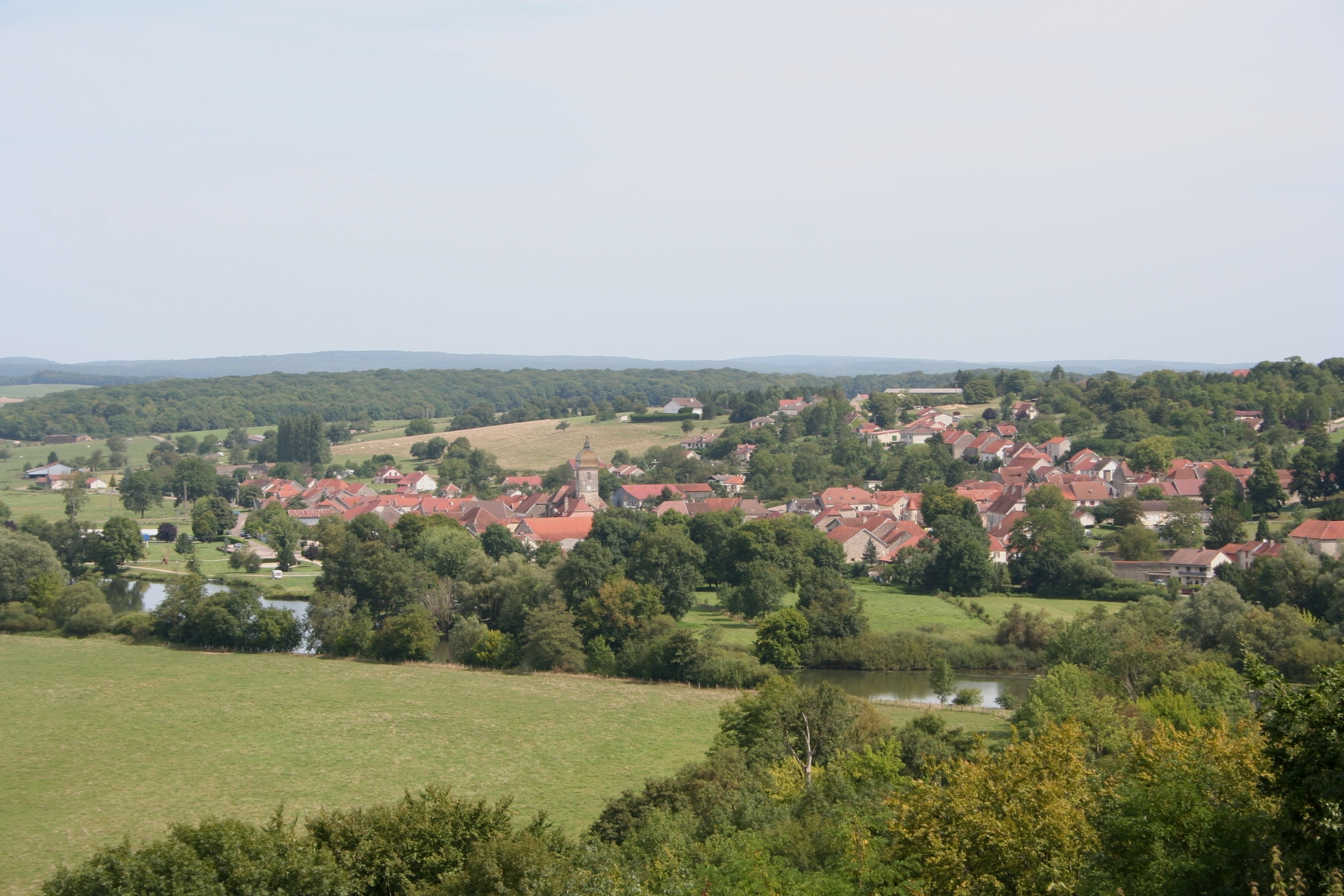
- A general view of Soing

- Coat of arms
- Location of Soing-Cubry-Charentenay
- Location within France Location within Bourgogne-Franche-Comté
- Coordinates: 47°34′59″N 5°52′46″E
- Country: France
- Region: Bourgogne-Franche-Comté
- Department: Haute-Saône
- Arrondissement: Vesoul
- Canton: Scey-sur-Saône-et-Saint-Albin

Government
  - Mayor (2020–2026): Didier Pierre
- Area^{1}: 28.63 km^{2} (11.05 sq mi)
- Highest elevation: 269 m (883 ft)
- Lowest elevation: 195 m (640 ft)
- Population (2023): 555
  - Density: 19.4/km^{2} (50.2/sq mi)
- Time zone: UTC+01:00 (CET)
  - Summer (DST): UTC+02:00 (CEST)
- INSEE/Postal code: 70492 /70130
- ^{1} French Land Register data, which excludes lakes, ponds, glaciers > 1 km^{2} (0.386 sq mi or 247 acres) and river estuaries.

Soing-Cubry-Charentenay (French pronunciation: [swɛ̃ kybʁi ʃaʁɑ̃tnɛ]) is a commune in the Haute-Saône department in the region of Bourgogne-Franche-Comté in eastern France.

== See also ==
- Communes of the Haute-Saône department
