= Canton of Scey-sur-Saône-et-Saint-Albin =

Coordinates: 47.67°N 5.97°E

The canton of Scey-sur-Saône-et-Saint-Albin is an administrative division of the Haute-Saône department, in northeastern France. Its borders were modified at the French canton reorganisation which came into effect in March 2015. Its seat is in Scey-sur-Saône-et-Saint-Albin.

It consists of the following communes:

1. Aroz
2. Baignes
3. Les Bâties
4. Beaujeu-Saint-Vallier-Pierrejux-et-Quitteur
5. Bourguignon-lès-la-Charité
6. Boursières
7. Bucey-lès-Traves
8. Chantes
9. La Chapelle-Saint-Quillain
10. Chassey-lès-Scey
11. Chemilly
12. Clans
13. Étrelles-et-la-Montbleuse
14. Ferrières-lès-Scey
15. Frasne-le-Château
16. Fresne-Saint-Mamès
17. Fretigney-et-Velloreille
18. Grandvelle-et-le-Perrenot
19. Lieffrans
20. Mailley-et-Chazelot
21. Mercey-sur-Saône
22. Neuvelle-lès-la-Charité
23. Noidans-le-Ferroux
24. Oiselay-et-Grachaux
25. Ovanches
26. Pontcey
27. Raze
28. La Romaine
29. Rosey
30. Rupt-sur-Saône
31. Sainte-Reine
32. Saint-Gand
33. Scey-sur-Saône-et-Saint-Albin
34. Seveux-Motey
35. Soing-Cubry-Charentenay
36. Traves
37. Vaux-le-Moncelot
38. Velle-le-Châtel
39. Velleguindry-et-Levrecey
40. Vellemoz
41. Vellexon-Queutrey-et-Vaudey
42. La Vernotte
43. Vy-le-Ferroux
44. Vy-lès-Rupt
