= La Chapelle-Saint-Quillain =

- Commune
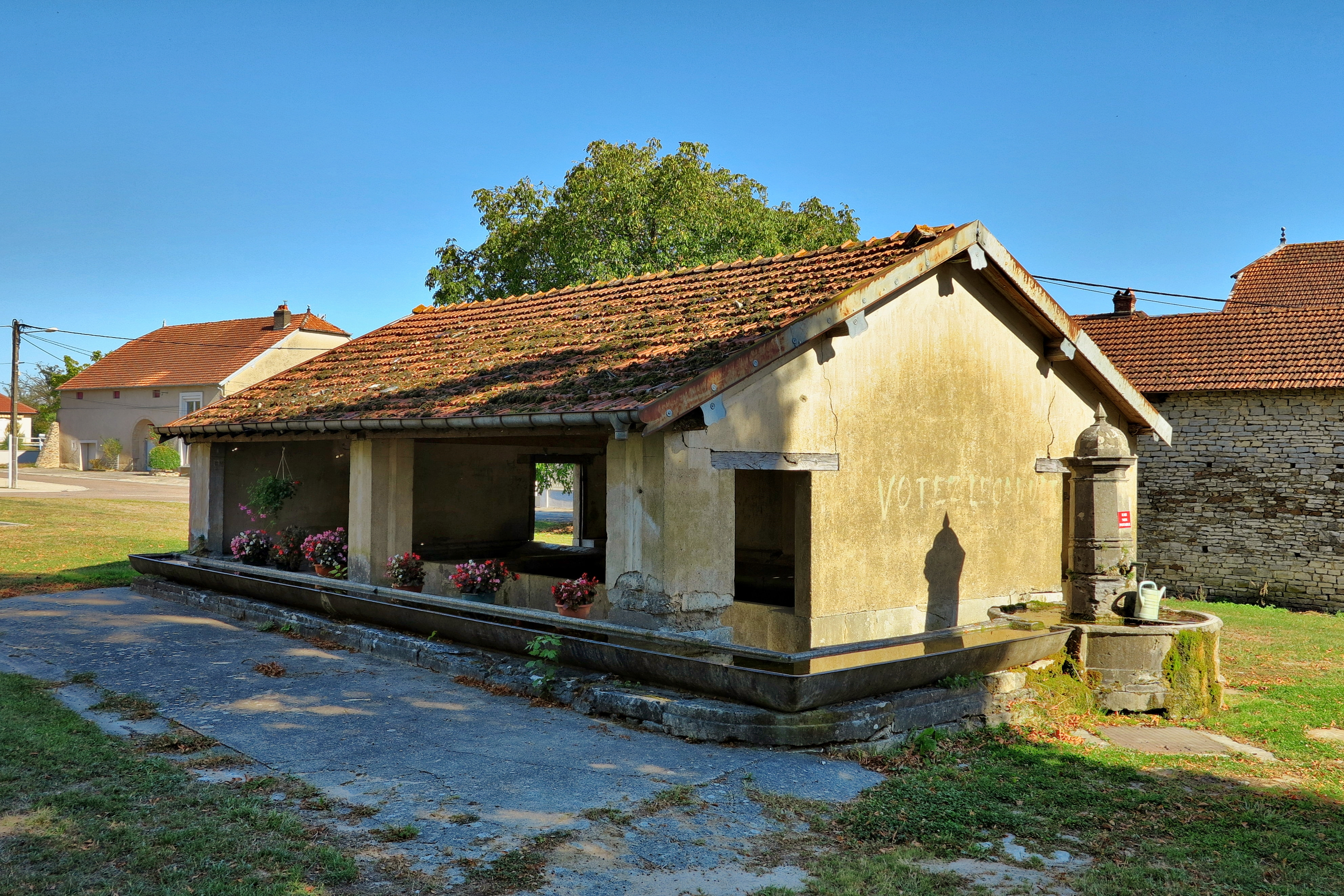
- The wash house in La Chapelle-Saint-Quillain
- Location of La Chapelle-Saint-Quillain
- Location within France Location within Bourgogne-Franche-Comté
- Coordinates: 47°28′36″N 5°48′56″E
- Country: France
- Region: Bourgogne-Franche-Comté
- Department: Haute-Saône
- Arrondissement: Vesoul
- Canton: Scey-sur-Saône-et-Saint-Albin
- Area^{1}: 10.42 km^{2} (4.02 sq mi)
- Highest elevation: 262 m (860 ft)
- Lowest elevation: 222 m (728 ft)
- Population (2023): 142
  - Density: 13.6/km^{2} (35.3/sq mi)
- Time zone: UTC+01:00 (CET)
  - Summer (DST): UTC+02:00 (CEST)
- INSEE/Postal code: 70129 /70700
- ^{1} French Land Register data, which excludes lakes, ponds, glaciers > 1 km^{2} (0.386 sq mi or 247 acres) and river estuaries.

La Chapelle-Saint-Quillain is a commune in the Haute-Saône department in the region of Bourgogne-Franche-Comté in eastern France.

== See also ==
- Communes of the Haute-Saône department
