= Velleguindry-et-Levrecey =

- Commune
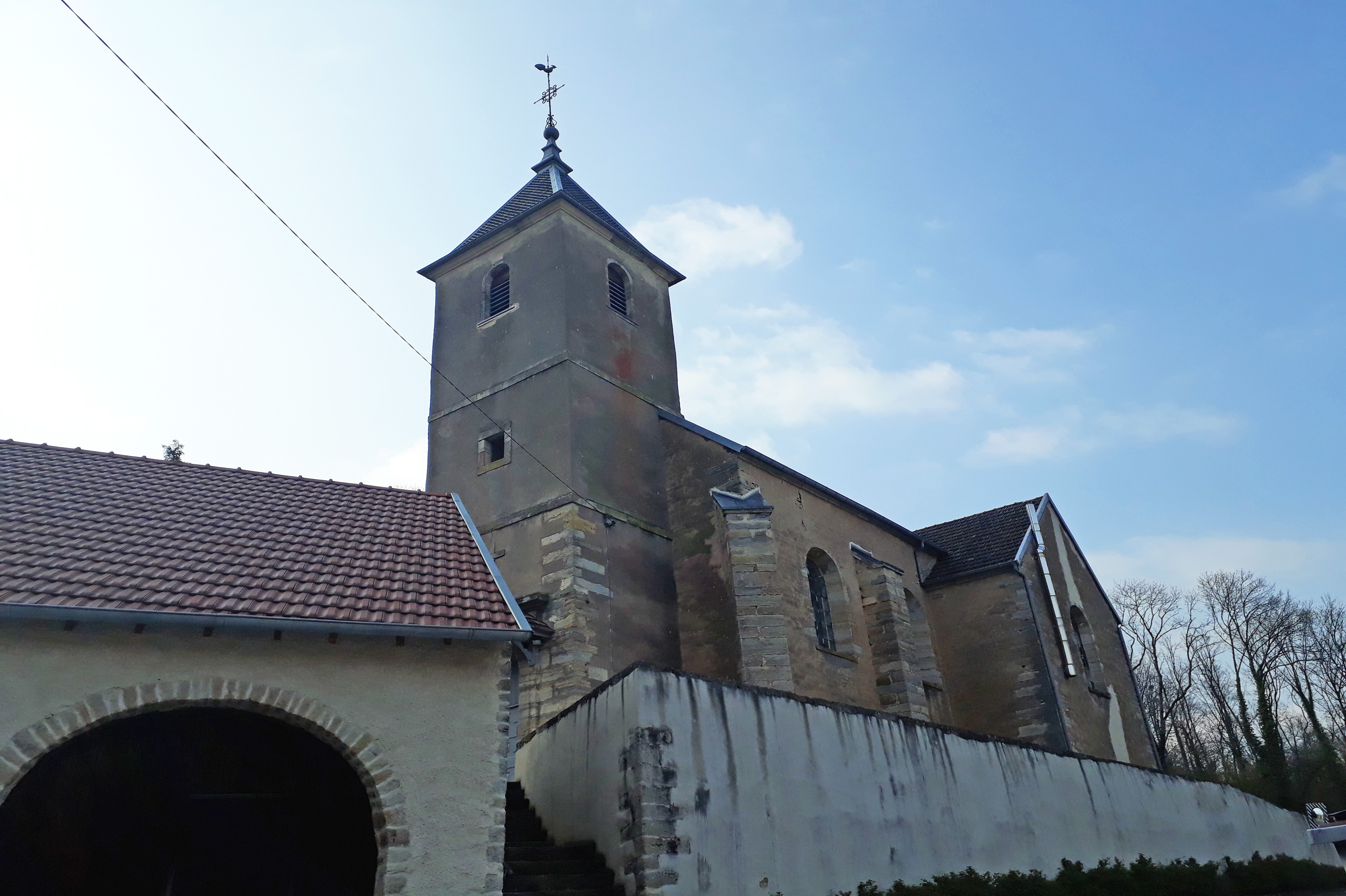
- The church in Velleguindry-et-Levrecey

- Coat of arms
- Location of Velleguindry-et-Levrecey
- Location within France Location within Bourgogne-Franche-Comté
- Coordinates: 47°33′33″N 6°05′57″E
- Country: France
- Region: Bourgogne-Franche-Comté
- Department: Haute-Saône
- Arrondissement: Vesoul
- Canton: Scey-sur-Saône-et-Saint-Albin
- Area^{1}: 10.54 km^{2} (4.07 sq mi)
- Highest elevation: 455 m (1,493 ft)
- Lowest elevation: 286 m (938 ft)
- Population (2023): 161
  - Density: 15.3/km^{2} (39.6/sq mi)
- Time zone: UTC+01:00 (CET)
  - Summer (DST): UTC+02:00 (CEST)
- INSEE/Postal code: 70535 /70000
- ^{1} French Land Register data, which excludes lakes, ponds, glaciers > 1 km^{2} (0.386 sq mi or 247 acres) and river estuaries.

Velleguindry-et-Levrecey is a commune in the Haute-Saône department in the region of Bourgogne-Franche-Comté in eastern France.

== See also ==
- Communes of the Haute-Saône department
