= Mercey-sur-Saône =

- Commune
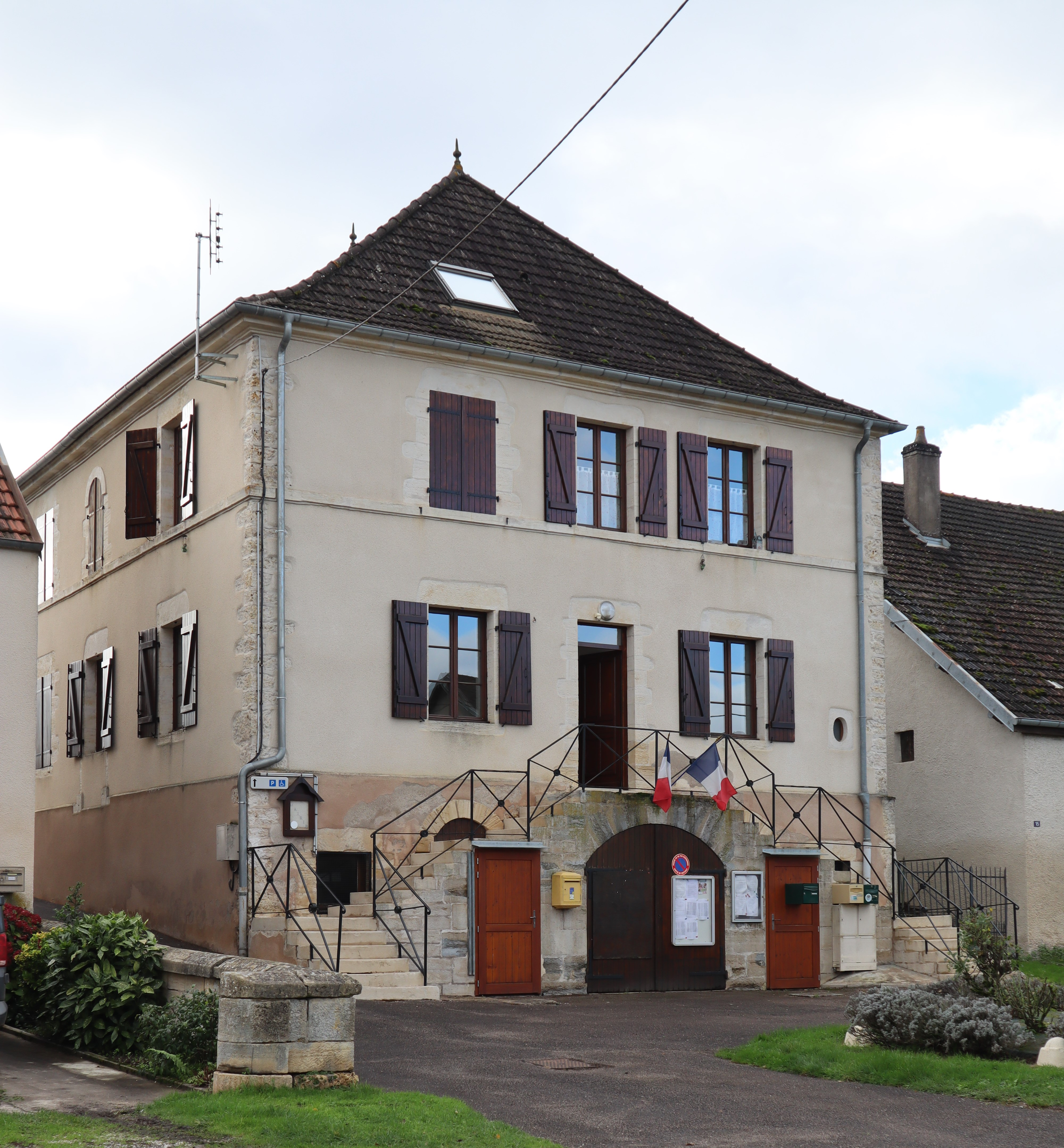
- Mercey-sur-Saône Town hall
- Location of Mercey-sur-Saône
- Location within France Location within Bourgogne-Franche-Comté
- Coordinates: 47°32′15″N 5°43′52″E
- Country: France
- Region: Bourgogne-Franche-Comté
- Department: Haute-Saône
- Arrondissement: Vesoul
- Canton: Scey-sur-Saône-et-Saint-Albin

Government
  - Mayor (2020–2026): Aurélien Girod
- Area^{1}: 7.69 km^{2} (2.97 sq mi)
- Highest elevation: 253 m (830 ft)
- Lowest elevation: 192 m (630 ft)
- Population (2023): 127
  - Density: 16.5/km^{2} (42.8/sq mi)
- Time zone: UTC+01:00 (CET)
  - Summer (DST): UTC+02:00 (CEST)
- INSEE/Postal code: 70342 /70130
- ^{1} French Land Register data, which excludes lakes, ponds, glaciers > 1 km^{2} (0.386 sq mi or 247 acres) and river estuaries.

Mercey-sur-Saône (French pronunciation: [mɛʁsɛ syʁ son], literally Mercey on Saône) is a commune in the Haute-Saône department in the region of Bourgogne-Franche-Comté in eastern France.

== See also ==
- Communes of the Haute-Saône department
