= Ovanches =

- Commune
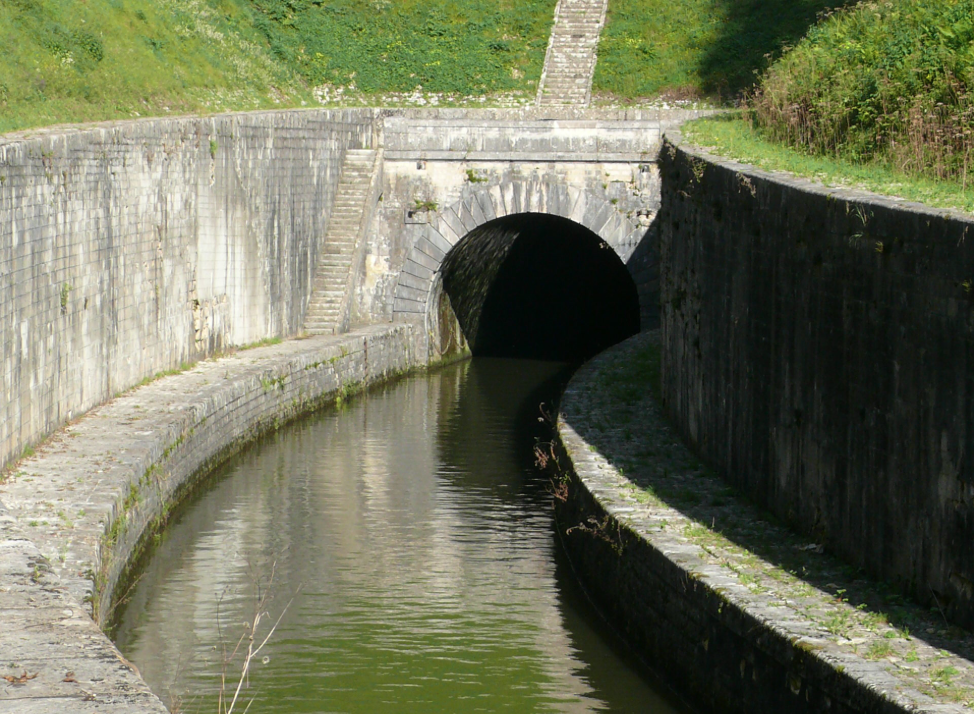
- The canal tunnel in Ovanches

- Coat of arms
- Location of Ovanches
- Location within France Location within Bourgogne-Franche-Comté
- Coordinates: 47°37′51″N 5°57′15″E
- Country: France
- Region: Bourgogne-Franche-Comté
- Department: Haute-Saône
- Arrondissement: Vesoul
- Canton: Scey-sur-Saône-et-Saint-Albin

Government
  - Mayor (2020–2026): Jean-Louis Desroches
- Area^{1}: 6.70 km^{2} (2.59 sq mi)
- Highest elevation: 247 m (810 ft)
- Lowest elevation: 201 m (659 ft)
- Population (2023): 155
  - Density: 23.1/km^{2} (59.9/sq mi)
- Time zone: UTC+01:00 (CET)
  - Summer (DST): UTC+02:00 (CEST)
- INSEE/Postal code: 70401 /70360
- ^{1} French Land Register data, which excludes lakes, ponds, glaciers > 1 km^{2} (0.386 sq mi or 247 acres) and river estuaries.

Ovanches (French pronunciation: [ɔvɑ̃ʃ]) is a commune in the Haute-Saône department in the region of Bourgogne-Franche-Comté in eastern France.

== See also ==
- Communes of the Haute-Saône department
