= Les Bâties =

- Commune
- Location of Les Bâties
- Location within France Location within Bourgogne-Franche-Comté
- Coordinates: 47°30′28″N 5°53′34″E
- Country: France
- Region: Bourgogne-Franche-Comté
- Department: Haute-Saône
- Arrondissement: Vesoul
- Canton: Scey-sur-Saône-et-Saint-Albin

Government
  - Mayor (2020–2026): Thierry Lucot
- Area^{1}: 7.56 km^{2} (2.92 sq mi)
- Highest elevation: 253 m (830 ft)
- Lowest elevation: 211 m (692 ft)
- Population (2023): 75
  - Density: 9.9/km^{2} (26/sq mi)
- Time zone: UTC+01:00 (CET)
  - Summer (DST): UTC+02:00 (CEST)
- INSEE/Postal code: 70053 /70130
- ^{1} French Land Register data, which excludes lakes, ponds, glaciers > 1 km^{2} (0.386 sq mi or 247 acres) and river estuaries.

Les Bâties (French pronunciation: [le bati]) is a commune in the Haute-Saône department in the region of Bourgogne-Franche-Comté in eastern France.

== See also ==
- Communes of the Haute-Saône department
