= Frasne-le-Château =

- Commune
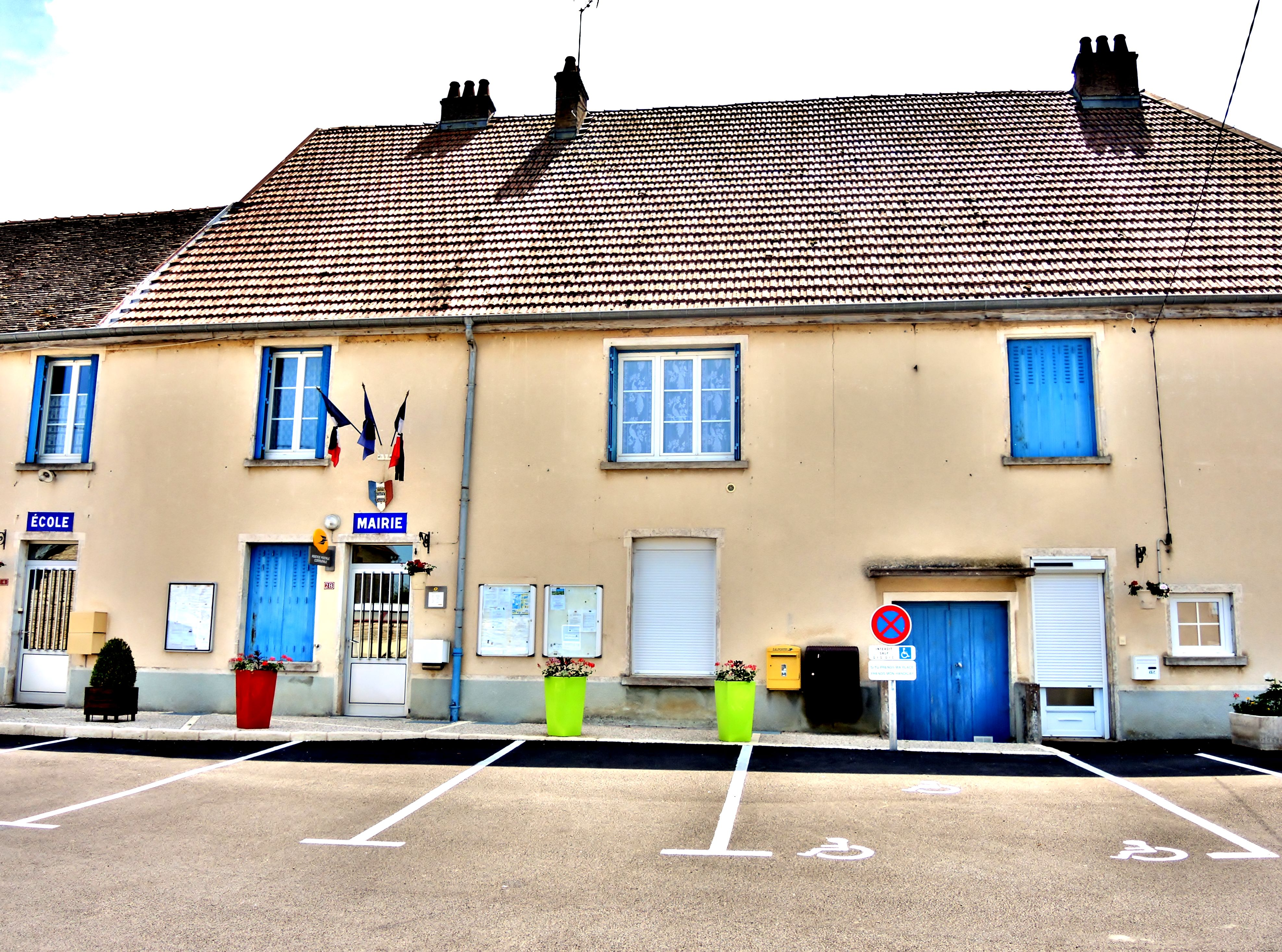
- The town hall in Frasne-le-Château

- Coat of arms
- Location of Frasne-le-Château
- Location within France Location within Bourgogne-Franche-Comté
- Coordinates: 47°27′49″N 5°53′40″E
- Country: France
- Region: Bourgogne-Franche-Comté
- Department: Haute-Saône
- Arrondissement: Vesoul
- Canton: Scey-sur-Saône-et-Saint-Albin

Government
  - Mayor (2020–2026): Claude Springaux
- Area^{1}: 12.50 km^{2} (4.83 sq mi)
- Highest elevation: 375 m (1,230 ft)
- Lowest elevation: 236 m (774 ft)
- Population (2023): 294
  - Density: 23.5/km^{2} (60.9/sq mi)
- Time zone: UTC+01:00 (CET)
  - Summer (DST): UTC+02:00 (CEST)
- INSEE/Postal code: 70253 /70700
- ^{1} French Land Register data, which excludes lakes, ponds, glaciers > 1 km^{2} (0.386 sq mi or 247 acres) and river estuaries.

Frasne-le-Château (French pronunciation: [fʁɑn lə ʃɑto]) is a commune in the Haute-Saône department in the region of Bourgogne-Franche-Comté in eastern France.

== See also ==
- Communes of the Haute-Saône department
