= Vy-le-Ferroux =

- Commune
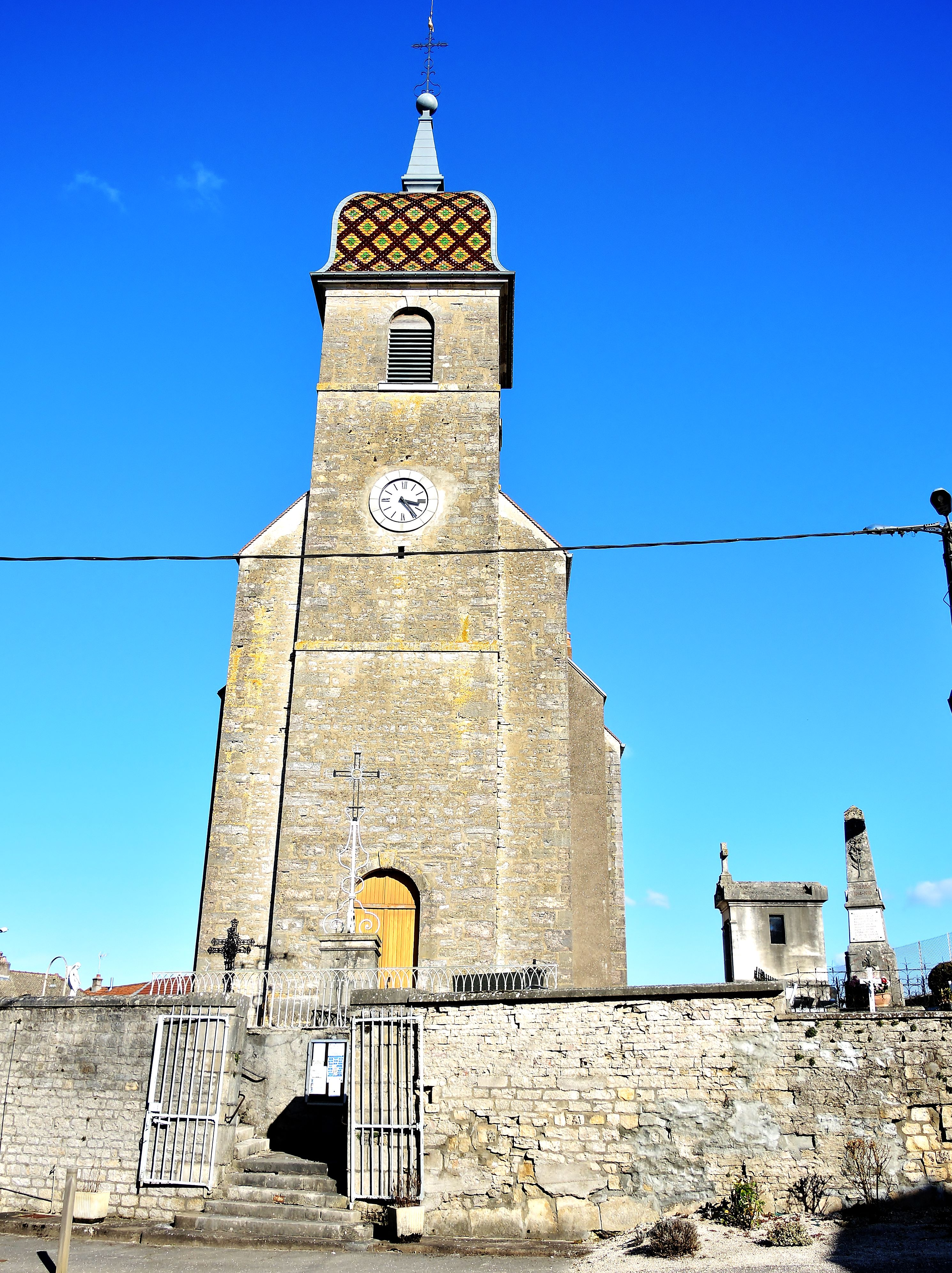
- The church in Vy-le-Ferroux
- Location of Vy-le-Ferroux
- Location within France Location within Bourgogne-Franche-Comté
- Coordinates: 47°35′14″N 5°58′29″E
- Country: France
- Region: Bourgogne-Franche-Comté
- Department: Haute-Saône
- Arrondissement: Vesoul
- Canton: Scey-sur-Saône-et-Saint-Albin
- Intercommunality: Combes

Government
  - Mayor (2020–2026): Laurent Delain
- Area^{1}: 5.70 km^{2} (2.20 sq mi)
- Highest elevation: 259 m (850 ft)
- Lowest elevation: 211 m (692 ft)
- Population (2023): 163
  - Density: 28.6/km^{2} (74.1/sq mi)
- Time zone: UTC+01:00 (CET)
  - Summer (DST): UTC+02:00 (CEST)
- INSEE/Postal code: 70580 /70130
- ^{1} French Land Register data, which excludes lakes, ponds, glaciers > 1 km^{2} (0.386 sq mi or 247 acres) and river estuaries.

Vy-le-Ferroux (French pronunciation: [vi lə fɛʁu]) is a commune in the Haute-Saône department in the region of Bourgogne-Franche-Comté in eastern France.

== Population ==
Historical population
Year	Pop.	±% p.a.
1968	174	—
1975	141	−2.96%
1982	149	+0.79%
1990	140	−0.78%
1999	147	+0.54%
2007	170	+1.83%
2012	163	−0.84%
2017	156	−0.87%
2023	163	+0.73%
Source: INSEE

== See also ==
- Communes of the Haute-Saône department
