= Chemilly, Haute-Saône =

Chemilly
- Commune
- Location of Chemilly
- Location within France Location within Bourgogne-Franche-Comté
- Coordinates: 47°38′57″N 6°01′34″E
- Country: France
- Region: Bourgogne-Franche-Comté
- Department: Haute-Saône
- Arrondissement: Vesoul
- Canton: Scey-sur-Saône-et-Saint-Albin
- Area^{1}: 3.77 km^{2} (1.46 sq mi)
- Highest elevation: 264 m (866 ft)
- Lowest elevation: 207 m (679 ft)
- Population (2023): 111
  - Density: 29.4/km^{2} (76.3/sq mi)
- Time zone: UTC+01:00 (CET)
  - Summer (DST): UTC+02:00 (CEST)
- INSEE/Postal code: 70148 /70360
- ^{1} French Land Register data, which excludes lakes, ponds, glaciers > 1 km^{2} (0.386 sq mi or 247 acres) and river estuaries.

Chemilly is a commune in the Haute-Saône department in the region of Bourgogne-Franche-Comté in eastern France.

== See also ==
- Communes of the Haute-Saône department
