= Sainte-Reine, Haute-Saône =

Sainte-Reine
- Commune
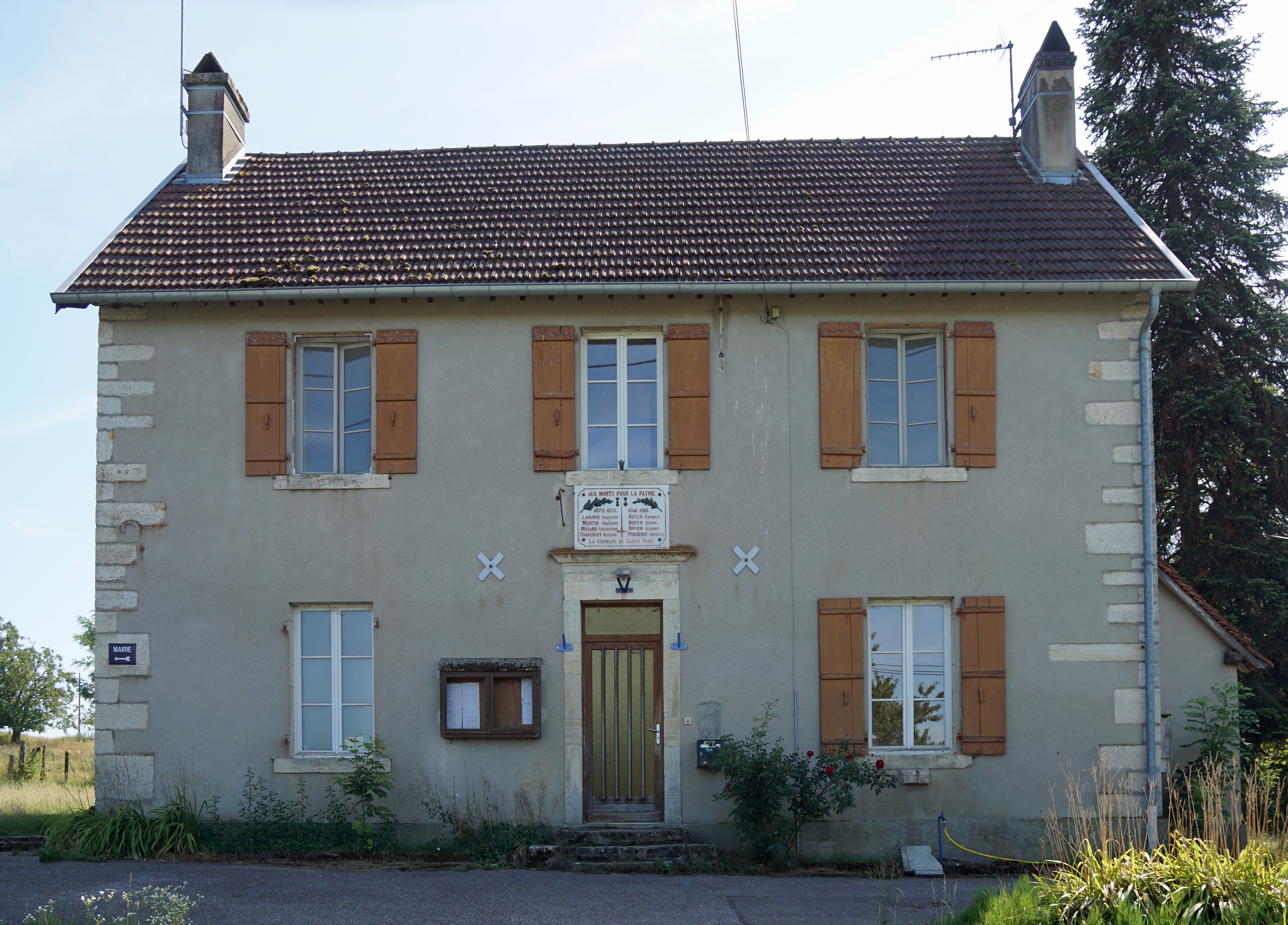
- Town hall
- Location of Sainte-Reine
- Location within France Location within Bourgogne-Franche-Comté
- Coordinates: 47°29′52″N 5°46′45″E
- Country: France
- Region: Bourgogne-Franche-Comté
- Department: Haute-Saône
- Arrondissement: Vesoul
- Canton: Scey-sur-Saône-et-Saint-Albin

Government
  - Mayor (2020–2026): Bernard Royer
- Area^{1}: 6.18 km^{2} (2.39 sq mi)
- Highest elevation: 254 m (833 ft)
- Lowest elevation: 214 m (702 ft)
- Population (2023): 23
  - Density: 3.7/km^{2} (9.6/sq mi)
- Time zone: UTC+01:00 (CET)
  - Summer (DST): UTC+02:00 (CEST)
- INSEE/Postal code: 70471 /70700
- ^{1} French Land Register data, which excludes lakes, ponds, glaciers > 1 km^{2} (0.386 sq mi or 247 acres) and river estuaries.

Sainte-Reine (French pronunciation: [sɛ̃t ʁɛn]) is a commune in the Haute-Saône department in the region of Bourgogne-Franche-Comté in eastern France.

== See also ==
- Communes of the Haute-Saône department
