= Mailley-et-Chazelot =

- Commune
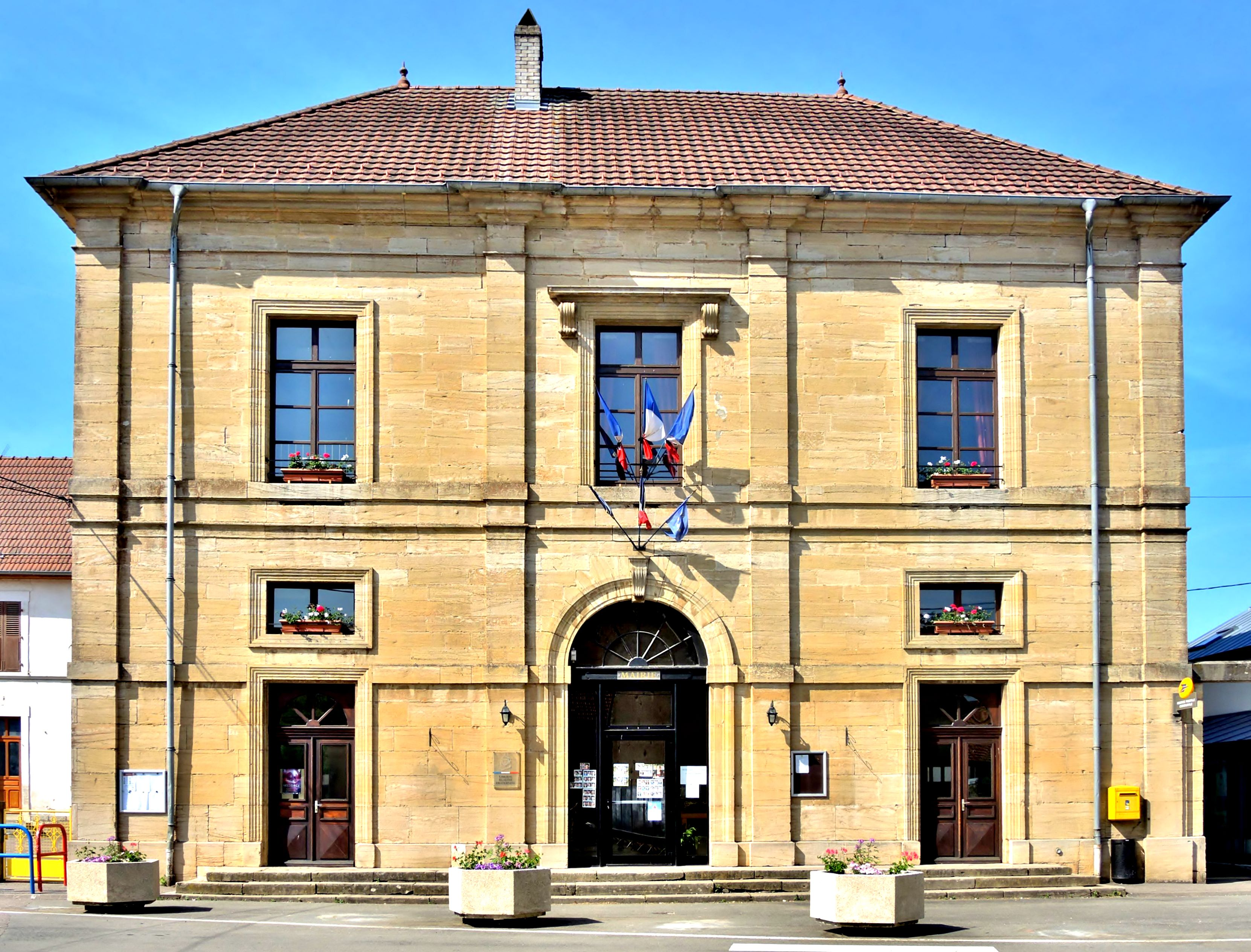
- The town hall in Mailley-et-Chazelot

- Coat of arms
- Location of Mailley-et-Chazelot
- Location within France Location within Bourgogne-Franche-Comté
- Coordinates: 47°32′13″N 6°03′09″E
- Country: France
- Region: Bourgogne-Franche-Comté
- Department: Haute-Saône
- Arrondissement: Vesoul
- Canton: Scey-sur-Saône-et-Saint-Albin

Government
  - Mayor (2020–2026): Bertrand Rezard
- Area^{1}: 25.03 km^{2} (9.66 sq mi)
- Highest elevation: 463 m (1,519 ft)
- Lowest elevation: 249 m (817 ft)
- Population (2023): 610
  - Density: 24/km^{2} (63/sq mi)
- Time zone: UTC+01:00 (CET)
  - Summer (DST): UTC+02:00 (CEST)
- INSEE/Postal code: 70324 /70000
- ^{1} French Land Register data, which excludes lakes, ponds, glaciers > 1 km^{2} (0.386 sq mi or 247 acres) and river estuaries.

Mailley-et-Chazelot (French pronunciation: [majɛ e ʃazlo]) is a commune in the Haute-Saône department in the region of Bourgogne-Franche-Comté in eastern France.

== See also ==
- Communes of the Haute-Saône department
