= Vy-lès-Rupt =

- Commune
- Coat of arms
- Location of Vy-lès-Rupt
- Location within France Location within Bourgogne-Franche-Comté
- Coordinates: 47°38′27″N 5°53′48″E
- Country: France
- Region: Bourgogne-Franche-Comté
- Department: Haute-Saône
- Arrondissement: Vesoul
- Canton: Scey-sur-Saône-et-Saint-Albin
- Intercommunality: Combes

Government
  - Mayor (2020–2026): Éric Masoyé
- Area^{1}: 8.28 km^{2} (3.20 sq mi)
- Highest elevation: 266 m (873 ft)
- Lowest elevation: 201 m (659 ft)
- Population (2023): 84
  - Density: 10/km^{2} (26/sq mi)
- Time zone: UTC+01:00 (CET)
  - Summer (DST): UTC+02:00 (CEST)
- INSEE/Postal code: 70582 /70120
- ^{1} French Land Register data, which excludes lakes, ponds, glaciers > 1 km^{2} (0.386 sq mi or 247 acres) and river estuaries.

Vy-lès-Rupt is a commune in the Haute-Saône department in the region of Bourgogne-Franche-Comté in eastern France.

== Population ==
Historical population
Year	Pop.	±% p.a.
1968	140	—
1975	145	+0.50%
1982	113	−3.50%
1990	101	−1.39%
1999	100	−0.11%
2007	101	+0.12%
2012	102	+0.20%
2017	90	−2.47%
2023	84	−1.14%
Source: INSEE

== See also ==
- Communes of the Haute-Saône department
