= Grandvelle-et-le-Perrenot =

- Commune
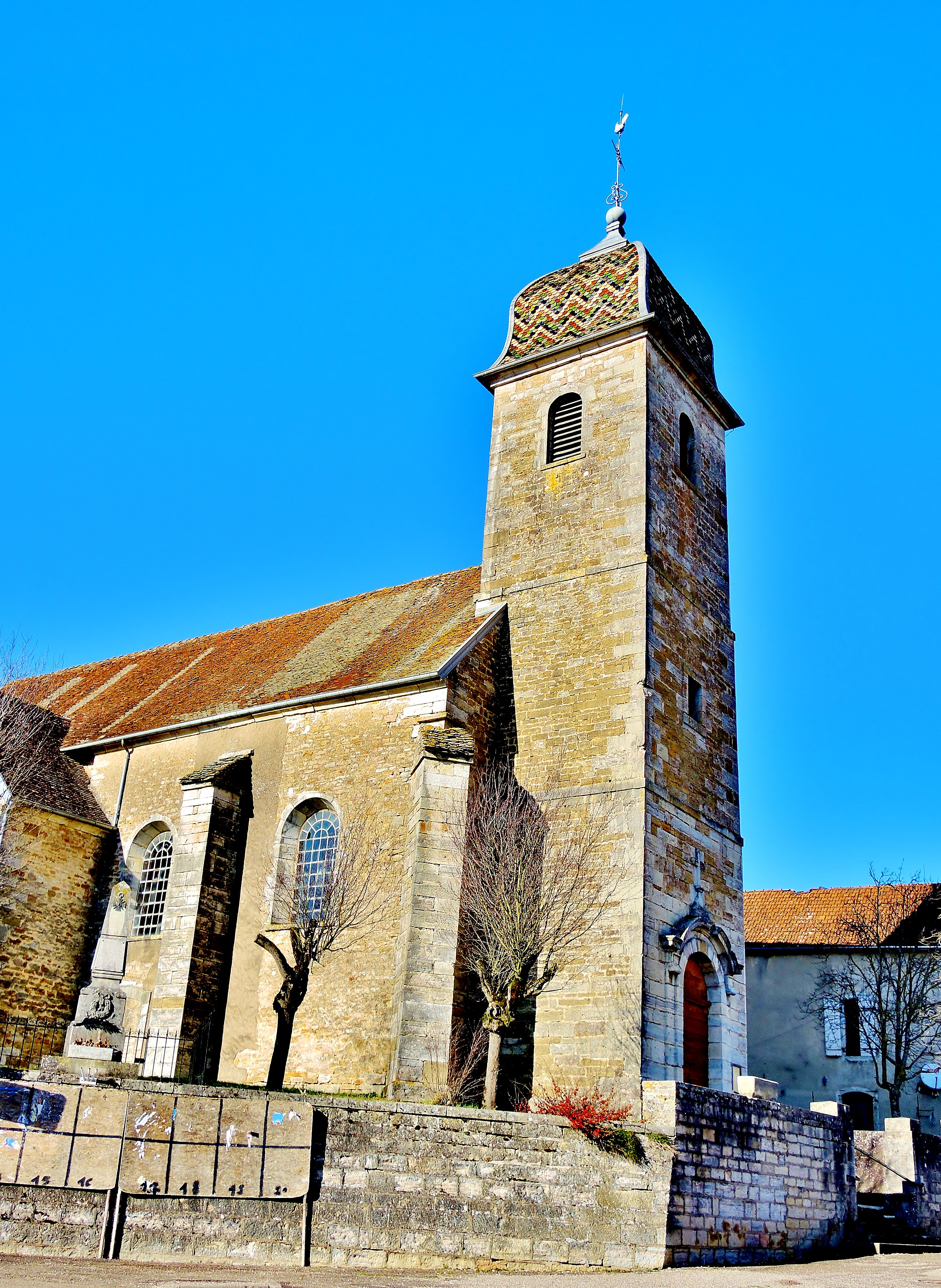
- The church in Grandvelle

- Coat of arms
- Location of Grandvelle-et-le-Perrenot
- Location within France Location within Bourgogne-Franche-Comté
- Coordinates: 47°30′35″N 5°59′46″E
- Country: France
- Region: Bourgogne-Franche-Comté
- Department: Haute-Saône
- Arrondissement: Vesoul
- Canton: Scey-sur-Saône-et-Saint-Albin

Government
  - Mayor (2020–2026): Jean-Louis Sauviat
- Area^{1}: 10.44 km^{2} (4.03 sq mi)
- Highest elevation: 436 m (1,430 ft)
- Lowest elevation: 227 m (745 ft)
- Population (2023): 383
  - Density: 36.7/km^{2} (95.0/sq mi)
- Time zone: UTC+01:00 (CET)
  - Summer (DST): UTC+02:00 (CEST)
- INSEE/Postal code: 70275 /70190
- ^{1} French Land Register data, which excludes lakes, ponds, glaciers > 1 km^{2} (0.386 sq mi or 247 acres) and river estuaries.

Grandvelle-et-le-Perrenot (French pronunciation: [ɡʁɑ̃vɛl e lə pɛʁno], before 1962: Grandvelle-et-Perrenot) is a commune in the Haute-Saône department in the region of Bourgogne-Franche-Comté in eastern France.

== See also ==
- Communes of the Haute-Saône department
