= Clans, Haute-Saône =

Clans
- Commune
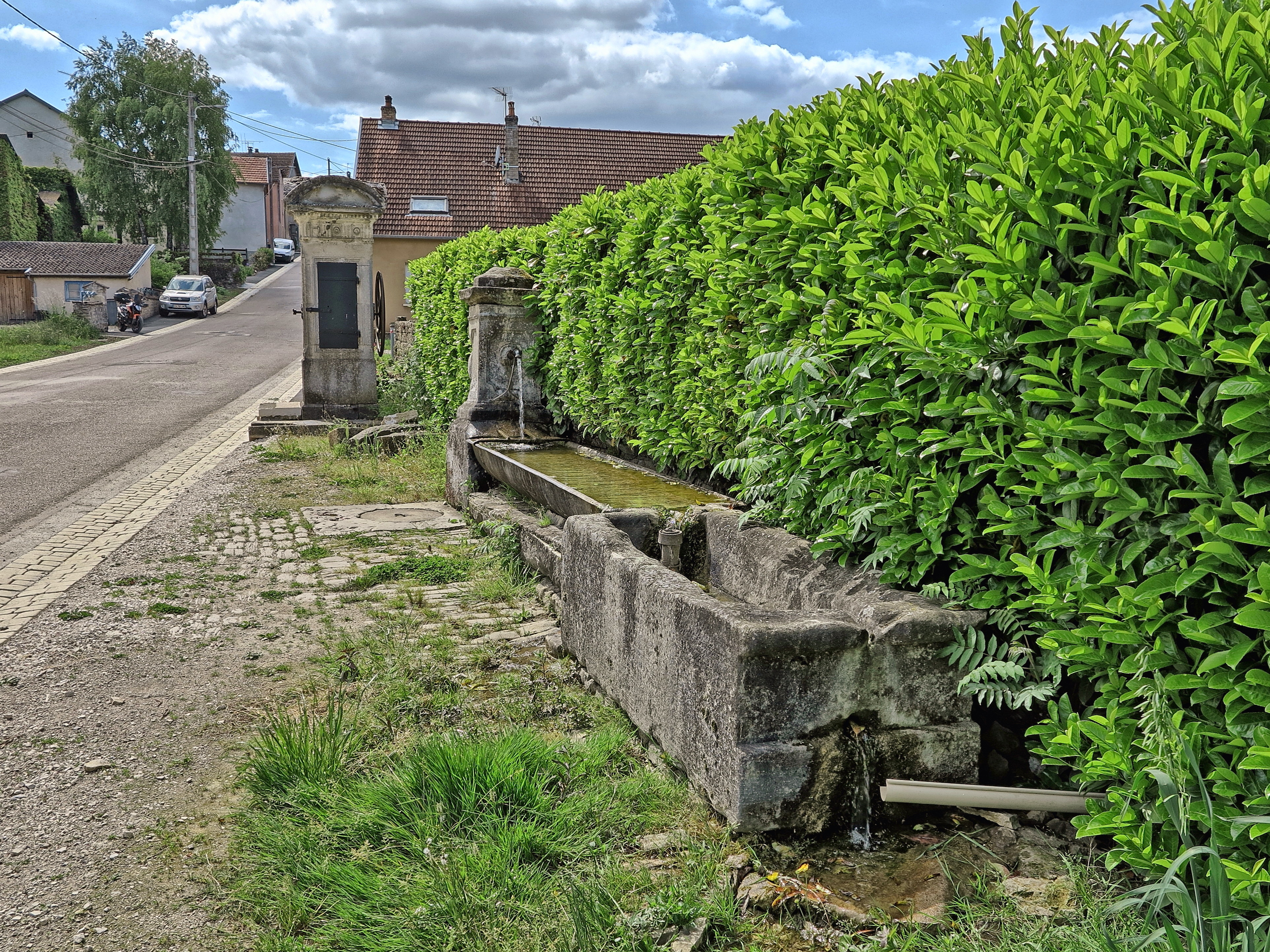
- The fountain and water trough in Clans
- Location of Clans
- Location within France Location within Bourgogne-Franche-Comté
- Coordinates: 47°36′11″N 6°02′24″E
- Country: France
- Region: Bourgogne-Franche-Comté
- Department: Haute-Saône
- Arrondissement: Vesoul
- Canton: Scey-sur-Saône-et-Saint-Albin

Government
  - Mayor (2020–2026): Christophe Ortiger
- Area^{1}: 4.37 km^{2} (1.69 sq mi)
- Highest elevation: 257 m (843 ft)
- Lowest elevation: 214 m (702 ft)
- Population (2023): 109
  - Density: 24.9/km^{2} (64.6/sq mi)
- Time zone: UTC+01:00 (CET)
  - Summer (DST): UTC+02:00 (CEST)
- INSEE/Postal code: 70158 /70000
- ^{1} French Land Register data, which excludes lakes, ponds, glaciers > 1 km^{2} (0.386 sq mi or 247 acres) and river estuaries.

Clans (French pronunciation: [klɑ̃]) is a commune in the Haute-Saône department in the region of Bourgogne-Franche-Comté in eastern France.

== See also ==
- Communes of the Haute-Saône department
