= Raze, Haute-Saône =

Raze
- Commune
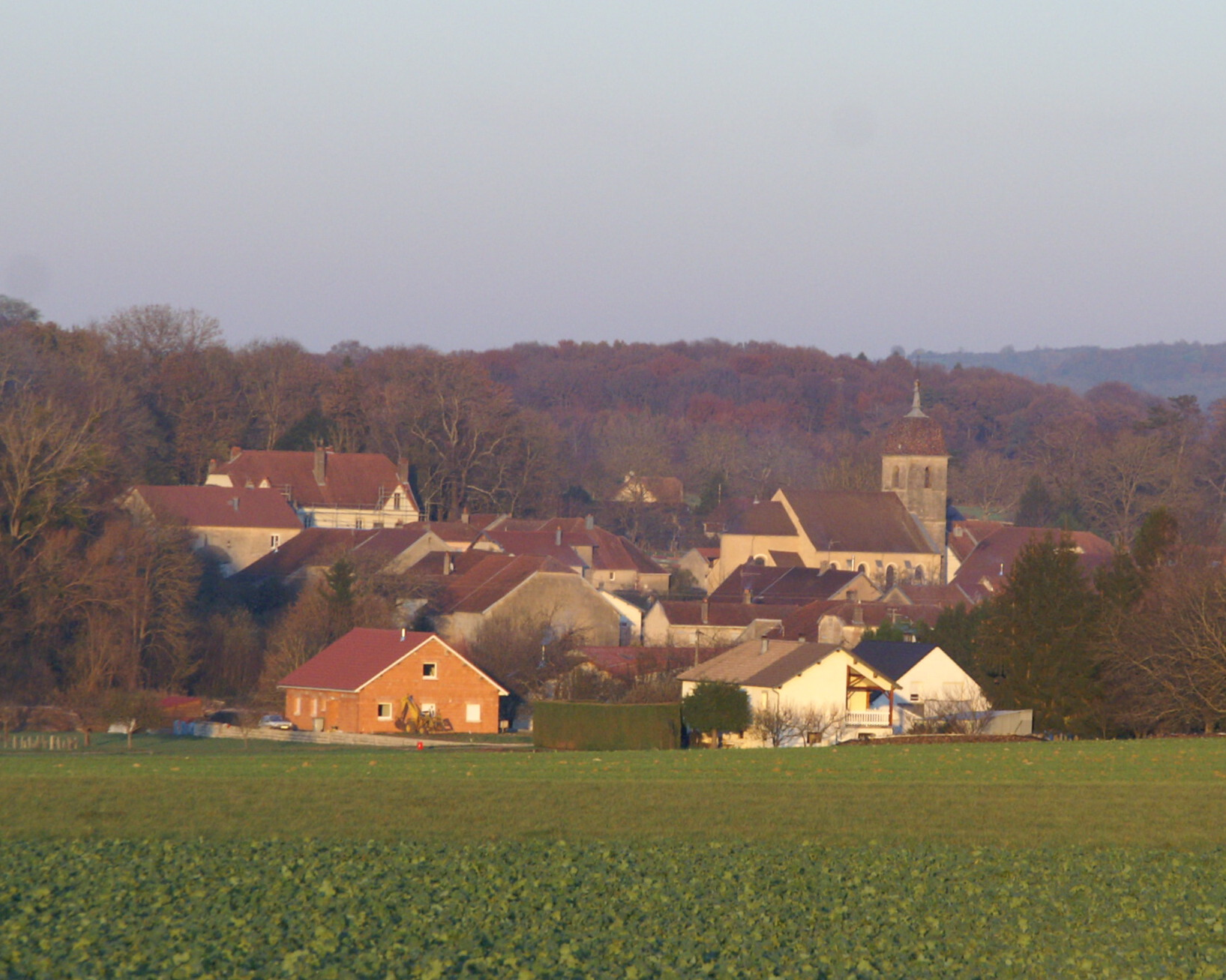
- A general view of Raze

- Coat of arms
- Location of Raze
- Location within France Location within Bourgogne-Franche-Comté
- Coordinates: 47°35′04″N 6°00′44″E
- Country: France
- Region: Bourgogne-Franche-Comté
- Department: Haute-Saône
- Arrondissement: Vesoul
- Canton: Scey-sur-Saône-et-Saint-Albin

Government
  - Mayor (2020–2026): Gérard Cachot
- Area^{1}: 10.02 km^{2} (3.87 sq mi)
- Highest elevation: 260 m (850 ft)
- Lowest elevation: 217 m (712 ft)
- Population (2023): 381
  - Density: 38.0/km^{2} (98.5/sq mi)
- Time zone: UTC+01:00 (CET)
  - Summer (DST): UTC+02:00 (CEST)
- INSEE/Postal code: 70439 /70000
- ^{1} French Land Register data, which excludes lakes, ponds, glaciers > 1 km^{2} (0.386 sq mi or 247 acres) and river estuaries.

Raze (French pronunciation: [ʁaz]) is a commune in the Haute-Saône department in the region of Bourgogne-Franche-Comté in eastern France.

== See also ==
- Communes of the Haute-Saône department
