= Baignes =

- Commune
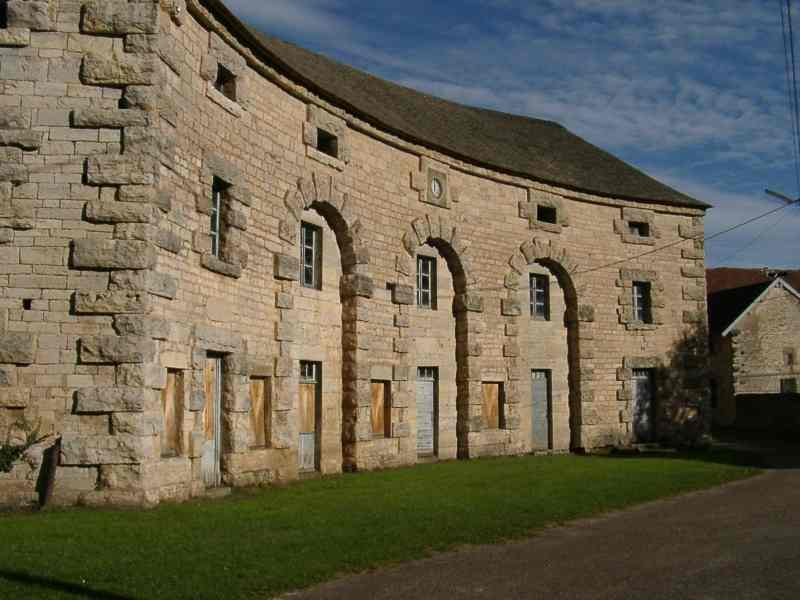
- The forges of Baignes
- Location of Baignes
- Location within France Location within Bourgogne-Franche-Comté
- Coordinates: 47°35′09″N 6°03′02″E
- Country: France
- Region: Bourgogne-Franche-Comté
- Department: Haute-Saône
- Arrondissement: Vesoul
- Canton: Scey-sur-Saône-et-Saint-Albin

Government
  - Mayor (2020–2026): Denis Bourdon
- Area^{1}: 2.87 km^{2} (1.11 sq mi)
- Highest elevation: 378 m (1,240 ft)
- Lowest elevation: 219 m (719 ft)
- Population (2023): 99
  - Density: 34/km^{2} (89/sq mi)
- Time zone: UTC+01:00 (CET)
  - Summer (DST): UTC+02:00 (CEST)
- INSEE/Postal code: 70047 /70000
- ^{1} French Land Register data, which excludes lakes, ponds, glaciers > 1 km^{2} (0.386 sq mi or 247 acres) and river estuaries.

Baignes (French pronunciation: [bɛɲ]) is a commune in the Haute-Saône department in the region of Bourgogne-Franche-Comté in eastern France.

== See also ==
- Communes of the Haute-Saône department
