= Chassey-lès-Scey =

- Commune
- Coat of arms
- Location of Chassey-lès-Scey
- Location within France Location within Bourgogne-Franche-Comté
- Coordinates: 47°38′40″N 5°58′46″E
- Country: France
- Region: Bourgogne-Franche-Comté
- Department: Haute-Saône
- Arrondissement: Vesoul
- Canton: Scey-sur-Saône-et-Saint-Albin

Government
  - Mayor (2020–2026): Julien Bigand
- Area^{1}: 4.38 km^{2} (1.69 sq mi)
- Highest elevation: 254 m (833 ft)
- Lowest elevation: 205 m (673 ft)
- Population (2023): 121
  - Density: 27.6/km^{2} (71.5/sq mi)
- Time zone: UTC+01:00 (CET)
  - Summer (DST): UTC+02:00 (CEST)
- INSEE/Postal code: 70138 /70360
- ^{1} French Land Register data, which excludes lakes, ponds, glaciers > 1 km^{2} (0.386 sq mi or 247 acres) and river estuaries.

Chassey-lès-Scey (French pronunciation: [ʃasɛ lɛ sɛ], literally Chassey near Scey) is a commune in the Haute-Saône department in the region of Bourgogne-Franche-Comté in eastern France.

== See also ==
- Communes of the Haute-Saône department
