= Velle-le-Châtel =

- Commune
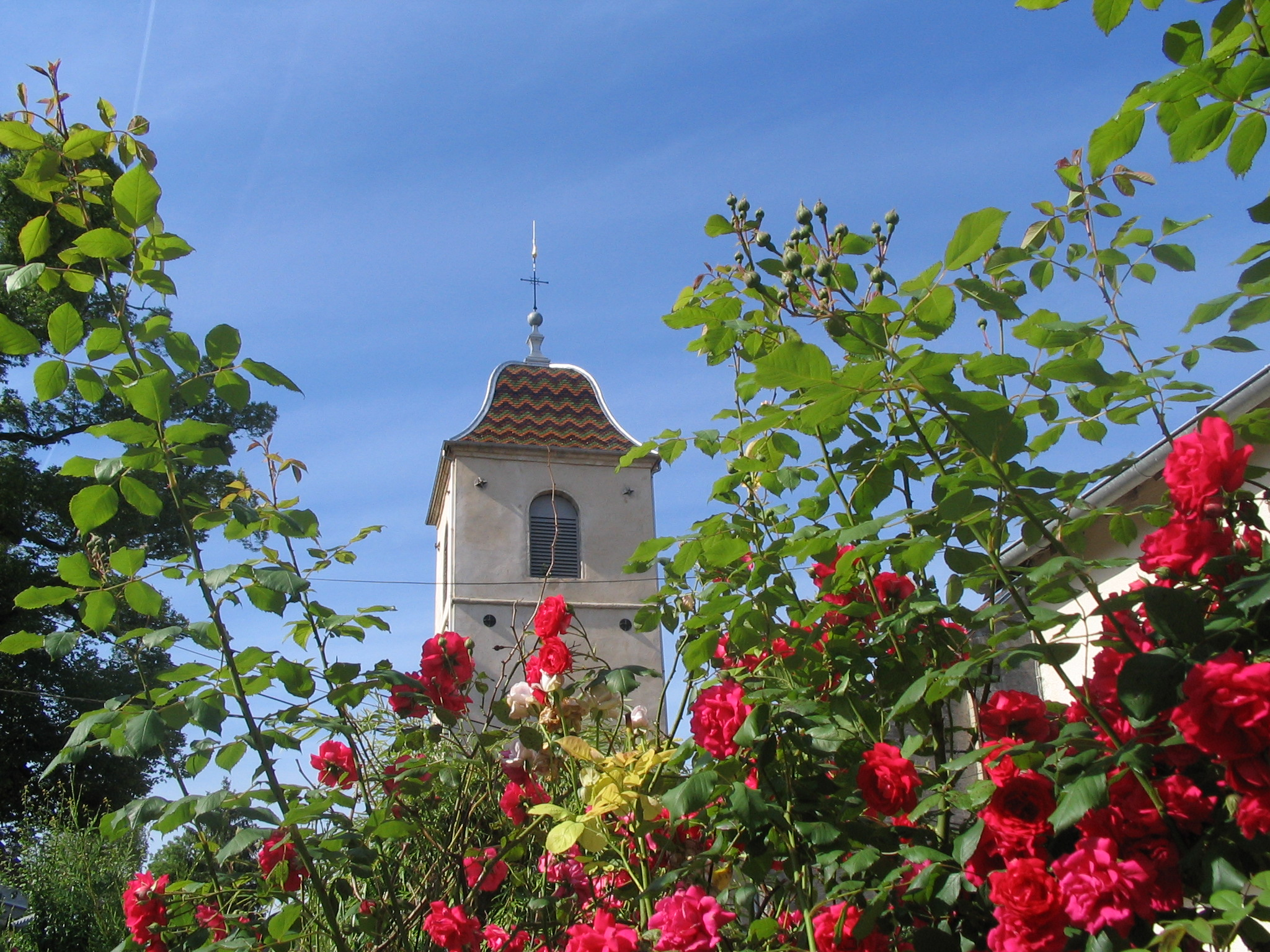
- The bell tower in Velle-le-Châtel
- Location of Velle-le-Châtel
- Location within France Location within Bourgogne-Franche-Comté
- Coordinates: 47°36′03″N 6°02′52″E
- Country: France
- Region: Bourgogne-Franche-Comté
- Department: Haute-Saône
- Arrondissement: Vesoul
- Canton: Scey-sur-Saône-et-Saint-Albin
- Area^{1}: 3.00 km^{2} (1.16 sq mi)
- Highest elevation: 378 m (1,240 ft)
- Lowest elevation: 212 m (696 ft)
- Population (2023): 125
  - Density: 41.7/km^{2} (108/sq mi)
- Time zone: UTC+01:00 (CET)
  - Summer (DST): UTC+02:00 (CEST)
- INSEE/Postal code: 70536 /70000
- ^{1} French Land Register data, which excludes lakes, ponds, glaciers > 1 km^{2} (0.386 sq mi or 247 acres) and river estuaries.

Velle-le-Châtel is a commune in the Haute-Saône department in the region of Bourgogne-Franche-Comté in eastern France.

== See also ==
- Communes of the Haute-Saône department
