= Noidans-le-Ferroux =

- Commune
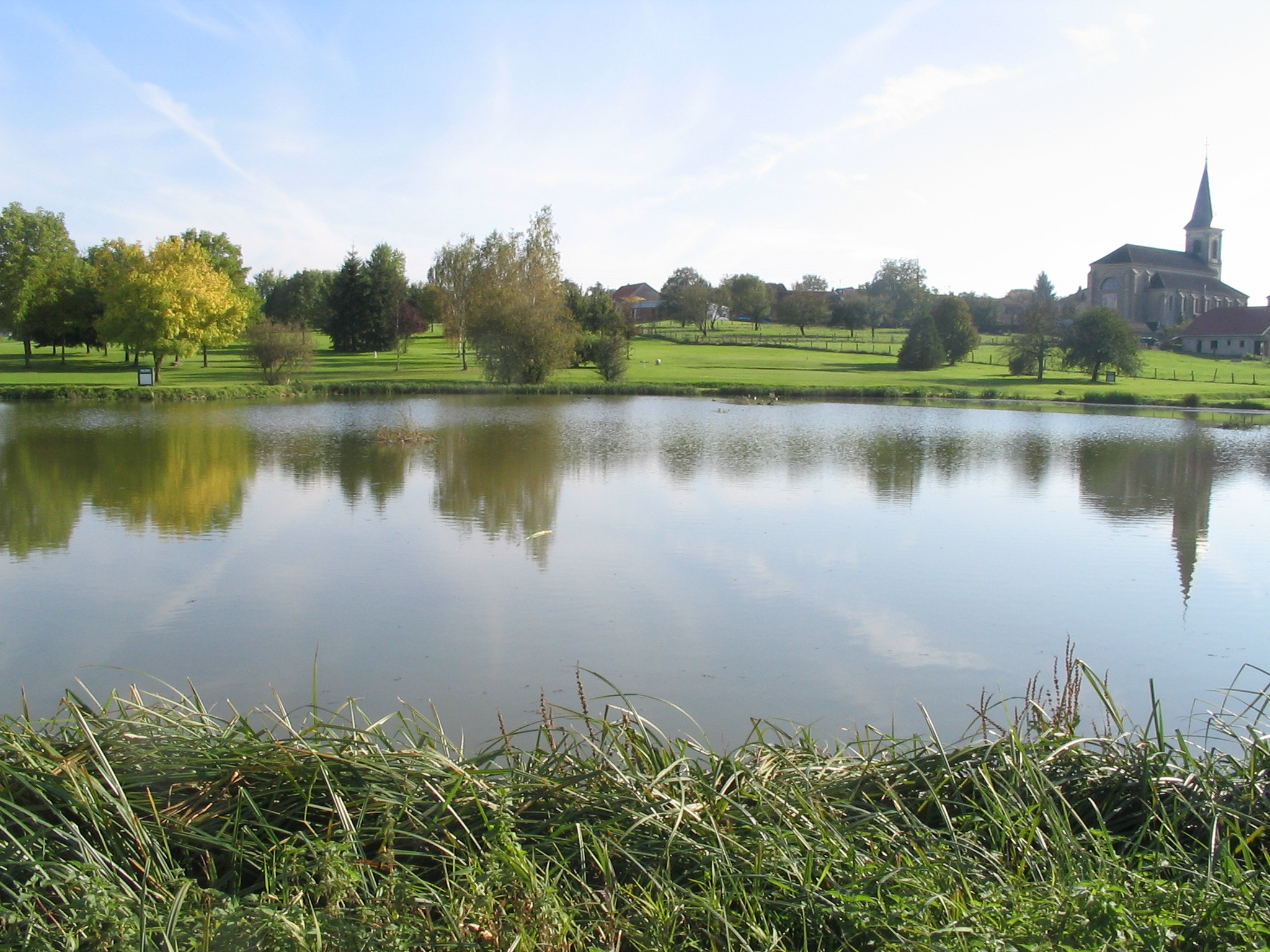
- The lake and church in Noidans-le-Ferroux

- Coat of arms
- Location of Noidans-le-Ferroux
- Location within France Location within Bourgogne-Franche-Comté
- Coordinates: 47°34′15″N 5°57′19″E
- Country: France
- Region: Bourgogne-Franche-Comté
- Department: Haute-Saône
- Arrondissement: Vesoul
- Canton: Scey-sur-Saône-et-Saint-Albin

Government
  - Mayor (2020–2026): Jean-Louis Bordet
- Area^{1}: 13.99 km^{2} (5.40 sq mi)
- Highest elevation: 267 m (876 ft)
- Lowest elevation: 218 m (715 ft)
- Population (2023): 646
  - Density: 46.2/km^{2} (120/sq mi)
- Time zone: UTC+01:00 (CET)
  - Summer (DST): UTC+02:00 (CEST)
- INSEE/Postal code: 70387 /70130
- ^{1} French Land Register data, which excludes lakes, ponds, glaciers > 1 km^{2} (0.386 sq mi or 247 acres) and river estuaries.

Noidans-le-Ferroux (French pronunciation: [nwadɑ̃ lə fɛʁu]) is a commune in the Haute-Saône department in the region of Bourgogne-Franche-Comté in eastern France.

== See also ==
- Communes of the Haute-Saône department
