= Étrelles-et-la-Montbleuse =

- Commune
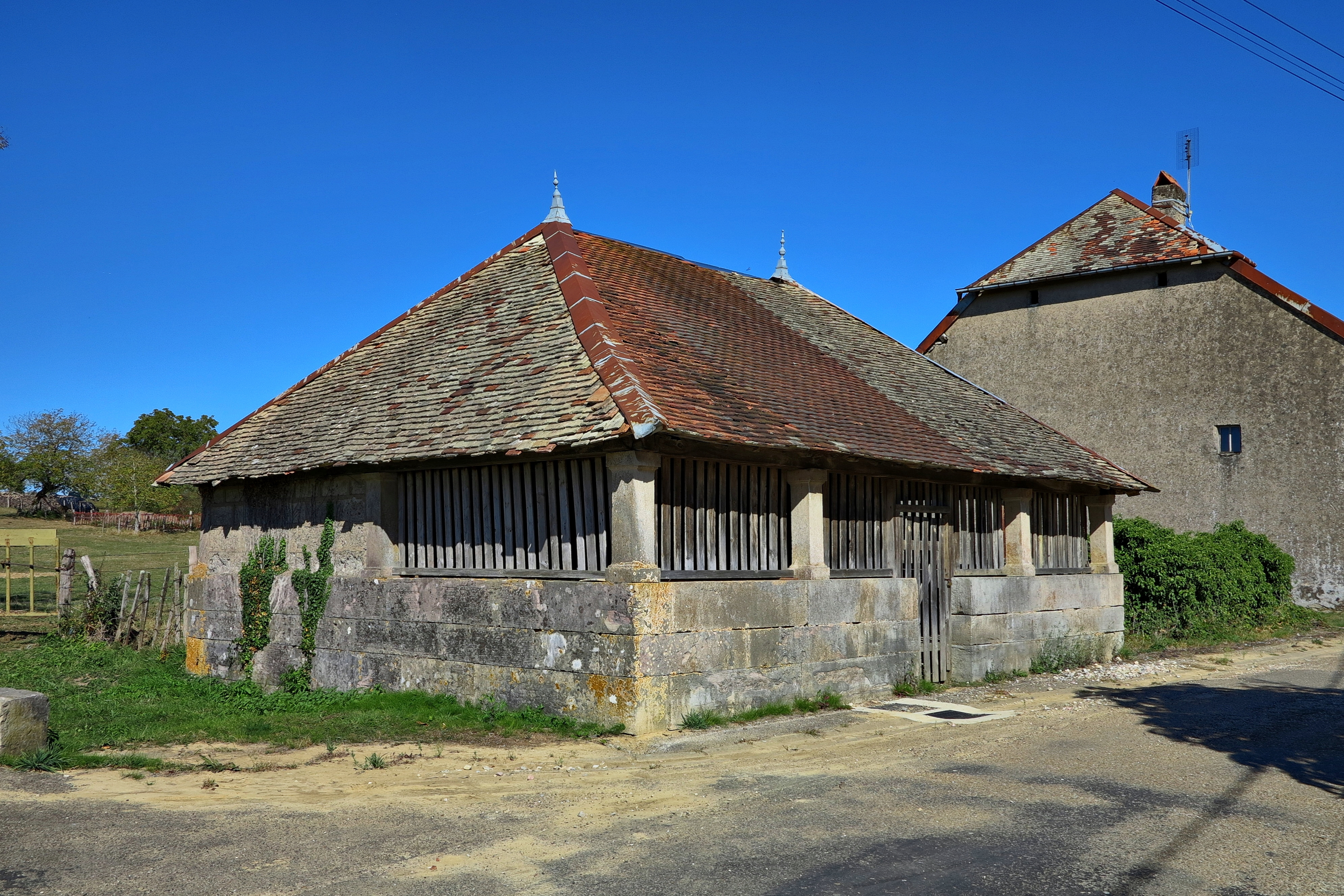
- The wash house in Étrelles
- Location of Étrelles-et-la-Montbleuse
- Location within France Location within Bourgogne-Franche-Comté
- Coordinates: 47°27′38″N 5°51′46″E
- Country: France
- Region: Bourgogne-Franche-Comté
- Department: Haute-Saône
- Arrondissement: Vesoul
- Canton: Scey-sur-Saône-et-Saint-Albin

Government
  - Mayor (2020–2026): Jacky Hezard
- Area^{1}: 6.26 km^{2} (2.42 sq mi)
- Highest elevation: 282 m (925 ft)
- Lowest elevation: 233 m (764 ft)
- Population (2023): 105
  - Density: 16.8/km^{2} (43.4/sq mi)
- Time zone: UTC+01:00 (CET)
  - Summer (DST): UTC+02:00 (CEST)
- INSEE/Postal code: 70222 /70700
- ^{1} French Land Register data, which excludes lakes, ponds, glaciers > 1 km^{2} (0.386 sq mi or 247 acres) and river estuaries.

Étrelles-et-la-Montbleuse (French pronunciation: [etʁɛl e la mɔ̃bløz]) is a commune in the Haute-Saône department in the region of Bourgogne-Franche-Comté in eastern France.

== See also ==
- Communes of the Haute-Saône department
