= Neuvelle-lès-la-Charité =

- Commune
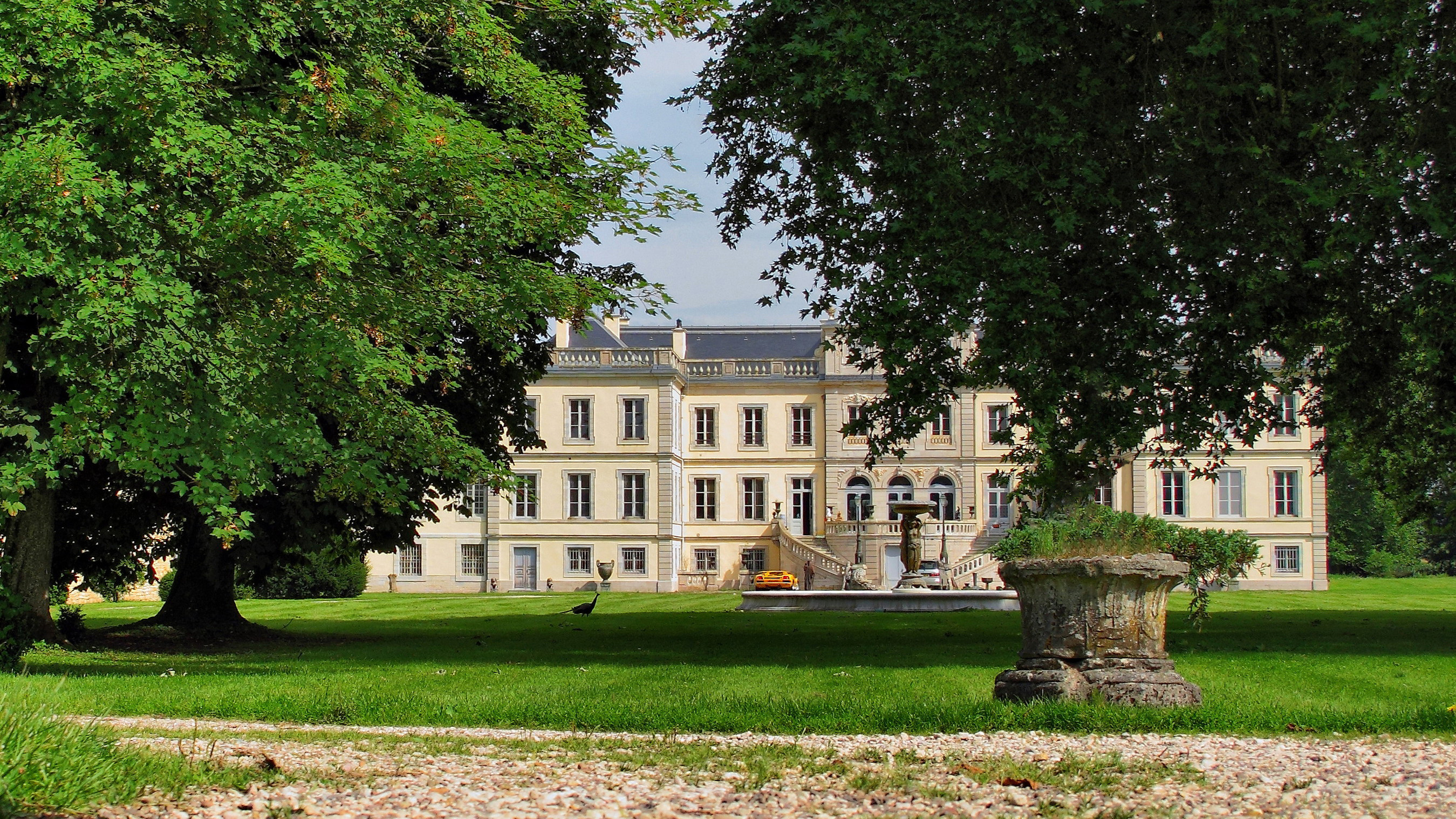
- The abbey in Neuvelle-lès-la-Charité
- Location of Neuvelle-lès-la-Charité
- Location within France Location within Bourgogne-Franche-Comté
- Coordinates: 47°32′19″N 5°57′11″E
- Country: France
- Region: Bourgogne-Franche-Comté
- Department: Haute-Saône
- Arrondissement: Vesoul
- Canton: Scey-sur-Saône-et-Saint-Albin

Government
  - Mayor (2020–2026): Patrick Le Garf
- Area^{1}: 13.20 km^{2} (5.10 sq mi)
- Highest elevation: 258 m (846 ft)
- Lowest elevation: 218 m (715 ft)
- Population (2023): 221
  - Density: 16.7/km^{2} (43.4/sq mi)
- Time zone: UTC+01:00 (CET)
  - Summer (DST): UTC+02:00 (CEST)
- INSEE/Postal code: 70384 /70130
- ^{1} French Land Register data, which excludes lakes, ponds, glaciers > 1 km^{2} (0.386 sq mi or 247 acres) and river estuaries.

Neuvelle-lès-la-Charité (French pronunciation: [nøvɛl lɛ la ʃaʁite]) is a commune in the Haute-Saône department in the region of Bourgogne-Franche-Comté in eastern France.

== See also ==
- Communes of the Haute-Saône department
