= Chantes =

- Commune
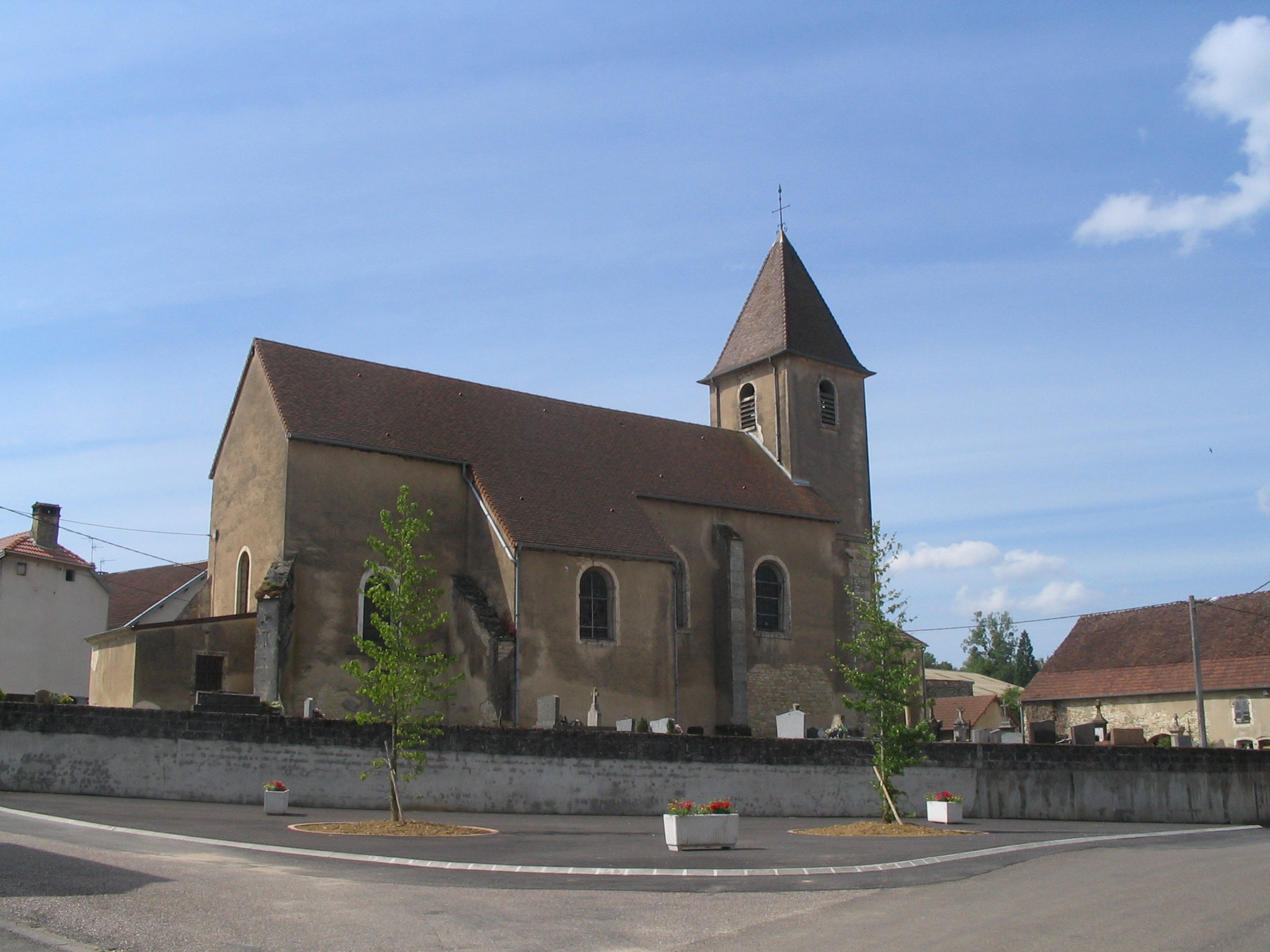
- The church in Chantes
- Location of Chantes
- Location within France Location within Bourgogne-Franche-Comté
- Coordinates: 47°38′02″N 5°55′55″E
- Country: France
- Region: Bourgogne-Franche-Comté
- Department: Haute-Saône
- Arrondissement: Vesoul
- Canton: Scey-sur-Saône-et-Saint-Albin

Government
  - Mayor (2020–2026): Laëtitia Dupont
- Area^{1}: 6.57 km^{2} (2.54 sq mi)
- Highest elevation: 262 m (860 ft)
- Lowest elevation: 201 m (659 ft)
- Population (2023): 108
  - Density: 16.4/km^{2} (42.6/sq mi)
- Time zone: UTC+01:00 (CET)
  - Summer (DST): UTC+02:00 (CEST)
- INSEE/Postal code: 70127 /70360
- ^{1} French Land Register data, which excludes lakes, ponds, glaciers > 1 km^{2} (0.386 sq mi or 247 acres) and river estuaries.

Chantes (French pronunciation: [ʃɑ̃t]) is a commune in the Haute-Saône department in the region of Bourgogne-Franche-Comté in eastern France.

== See also ==
- Communes of the Haute-Saône department
