= Boursières =

- Commune
- Location of Boursières
- Location within France Location within Bourgogne-Franche-Comté
- Coordinates: 47°36′32″N 6°02′36″E
- Country: France
- Region: Bourgogne-Franche-Comté
- Department: Haute-Saône
- Arrondissement: Vesoul
- Canton: Scey-sur-Saône-et-Saint-Albin

Government
  - Mayor (2020–2026): Jacques Marqueton
- Area^{1}: 2.28 km^{2} (0.88 sq mi)
- Highest elevation: 266 m (873 ft)
- Lowest elevation: 212 m (696 ft)
- Population (2023): 58
  - Density: 25/km^{2} (66/sq mi)
- Time zone: UTC+01:00 (CET)
  - Summer (DST): UTC+02:00 (CEST)
- INSEE/Postal code: 70090 /70000
- ^{1} French Land Register data, which excludes lakes, ponds, glaciers > 1 km^{2} (0.386 sq mi or 247 acres) and river estuaries.

Boursières (French pronunciation: [buʁsjɛʁ]) is a commune in the Haute-Saône department in the region of Bourgogne-Franche-Comté in eastern France.

== See also ==
- Communes of the Haute-Saône department
