= Vellexon-Queutrey-et-Vaudey =

- Commune
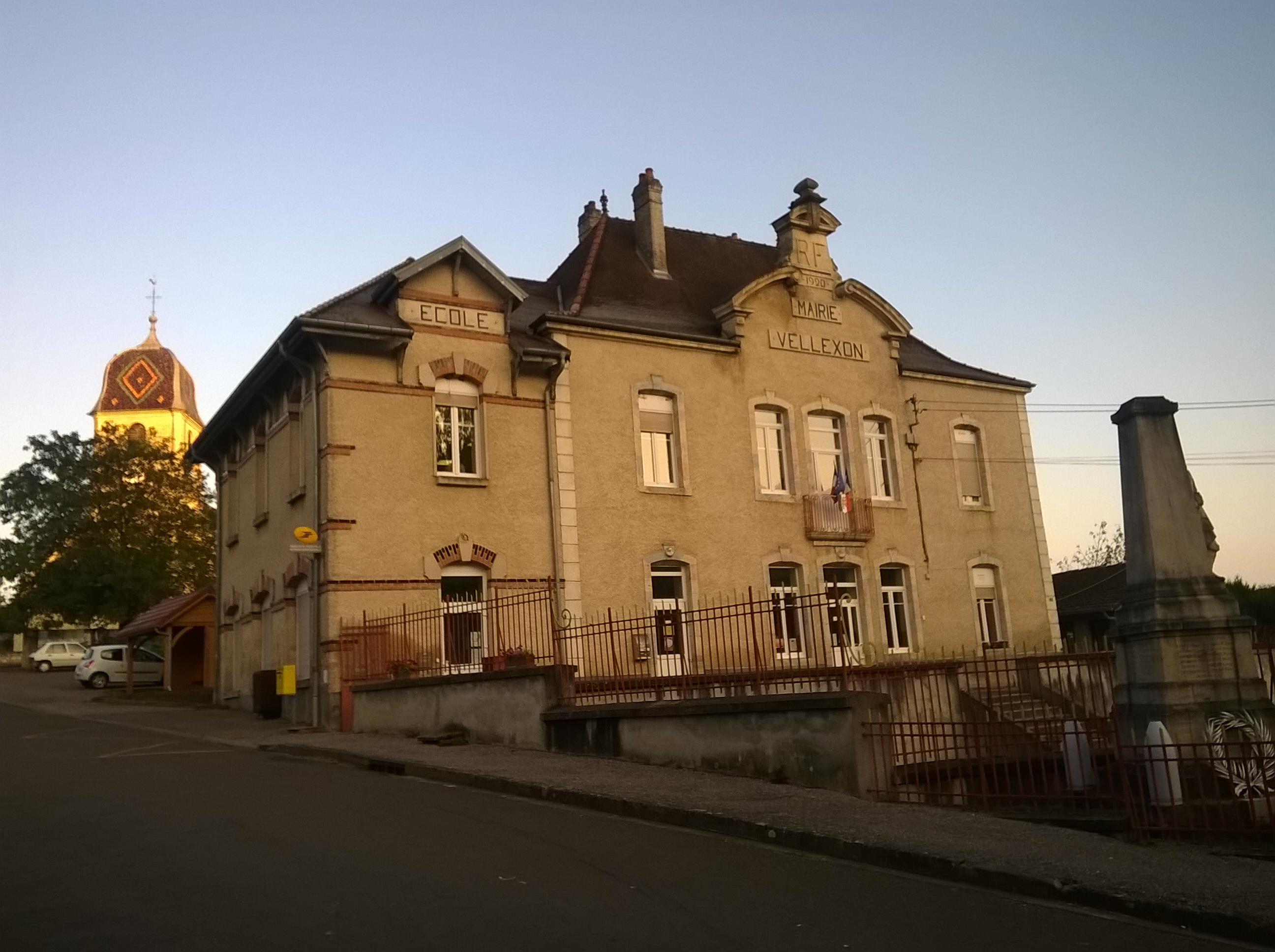
- The town hall in Vellexon-Queutrey-et-Vaudey
- Location of Vellexon-Queutrey-et-Vaudey
- Location within France Location within Bourgogne-Franche-Comté
- Coordinates: 47°33′47″N 5°48′22″E
- Country: France
- Region: Bourgogne-Franche-Comté
- Department: Haute-Saône
- Arrondissement: Vesoul
- Canton: Scey-sur-Saône-et-Saint-Albin

Government
  - Mayor (2020–2026): Dylan Demarche
- Area^{1}: 24.98 km^{2} (9.64 sq mi)
- Highest elevation: 260 m (850 ft)
- Lowest elevation: 197 m (646 ft)
- Population (2023): 487
  - Density: 19.5/km^{2} (50.5/sq mi)
- Time zone: UTC+01:00 (CET)
  - Summer (DST): UTC+02:00 (CEST)
- INSEE/Postal code: 70539 /70130
- ^{1} French Land Register data, which excludes lakes, ponds, glaciers > 1 km^{2} (0.386 sq mi or 247 acres) and river estuaries.

Vellexon-Queutrey-et-Vaudey (French pronunciation: [vɛlɛksɔ̃ køtʁɛ e vodɛ]) is a commune in the Haute-Saône department in the region of Bourgogne-Franche-Comté in eastern France.

== See also ==
- Communes of the Haute-Saône department
