= Lieffrans =

- Commune
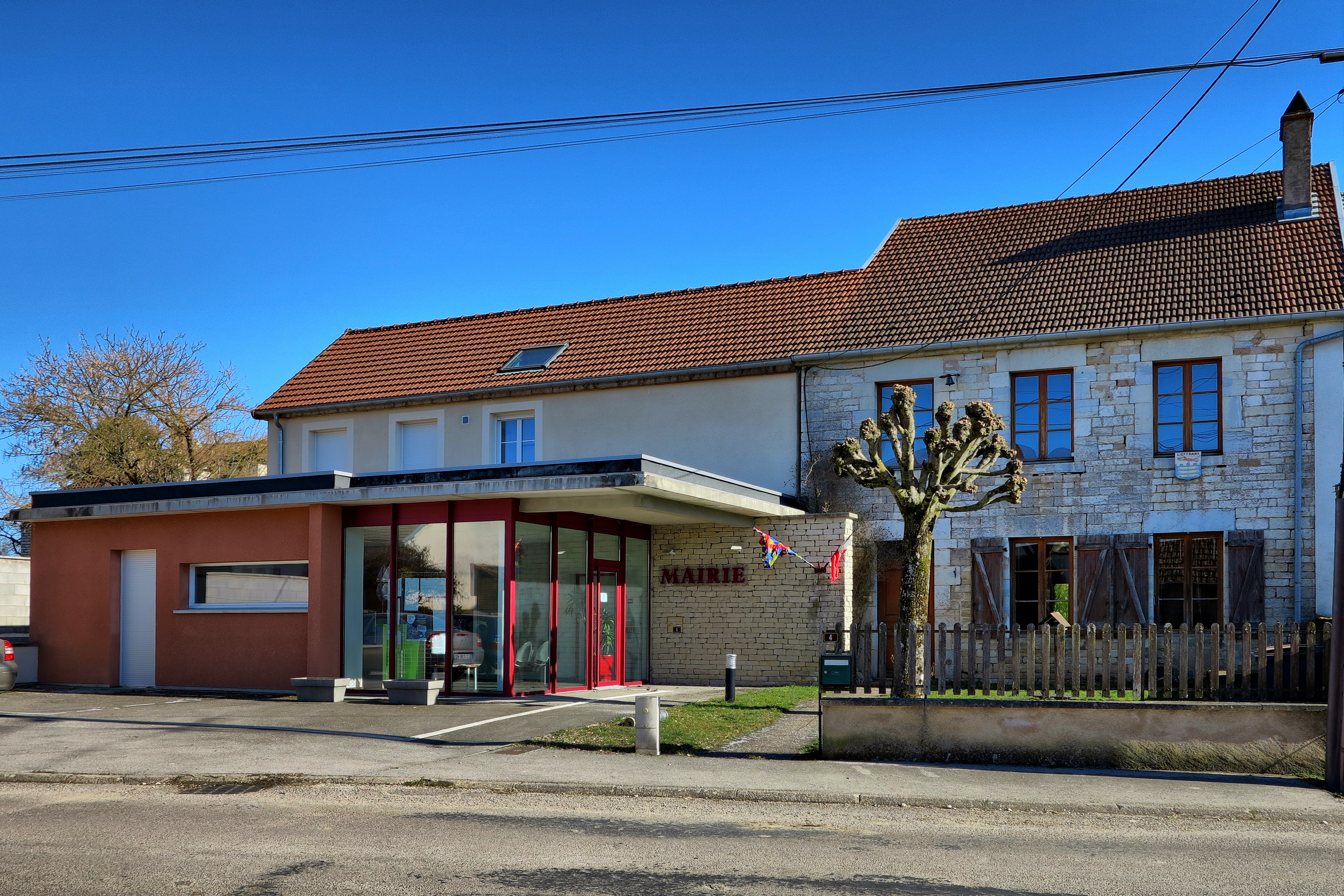
- The town hall in Lieffrans

- Coat of arms
- Location of Lieffrans
- Location within France Location within Bourgogne-Franche-Comté
- Coordinates: 47°31′15″N 5°58′19″E
- Country: France
- Region: Bourgogne-Franche-Comté
- Department: Haute-Saône
- Arrondissement: Vesoul
- Canton: Scey-sur-Saône-et-Saint-Albin

Government
  - Mayor (2020–2026): Olivier Corberand
- Area^{1}: 4.37 km^{2} (1.69 sq mi)
- Highest elevation: 255 m (837 ft)
- Lowest elevation: 222 m (728 ft)
- Population (2023): 50
  - Density: 11/km^{2} (30/sq mi)
- Time zone: UTC+01:00 (CET)
  - Summer (DST): UTC+02:00 (CEST)
- INSEE/Postal code: 70301 /70190
- ^{1} French Land Register data, which excludes lakes, ponds, glaciers > 1 km^{2} (0.386 sq mi or 247 acres) and river estuaries.

Lieffrans (French pronunciation: [ljɛfʁɑ̃]) is a commune in the Haute-Saône department, located in the region of Bourgogne-Franche-Comté in eastern France. It covers an area of total 4.37 km^{2}(1.69 sq mi)

Lieffrans

== See also ==
- Communes of the Haute-Saône department
