= Fretigney-et-Velloreille =

- Commune
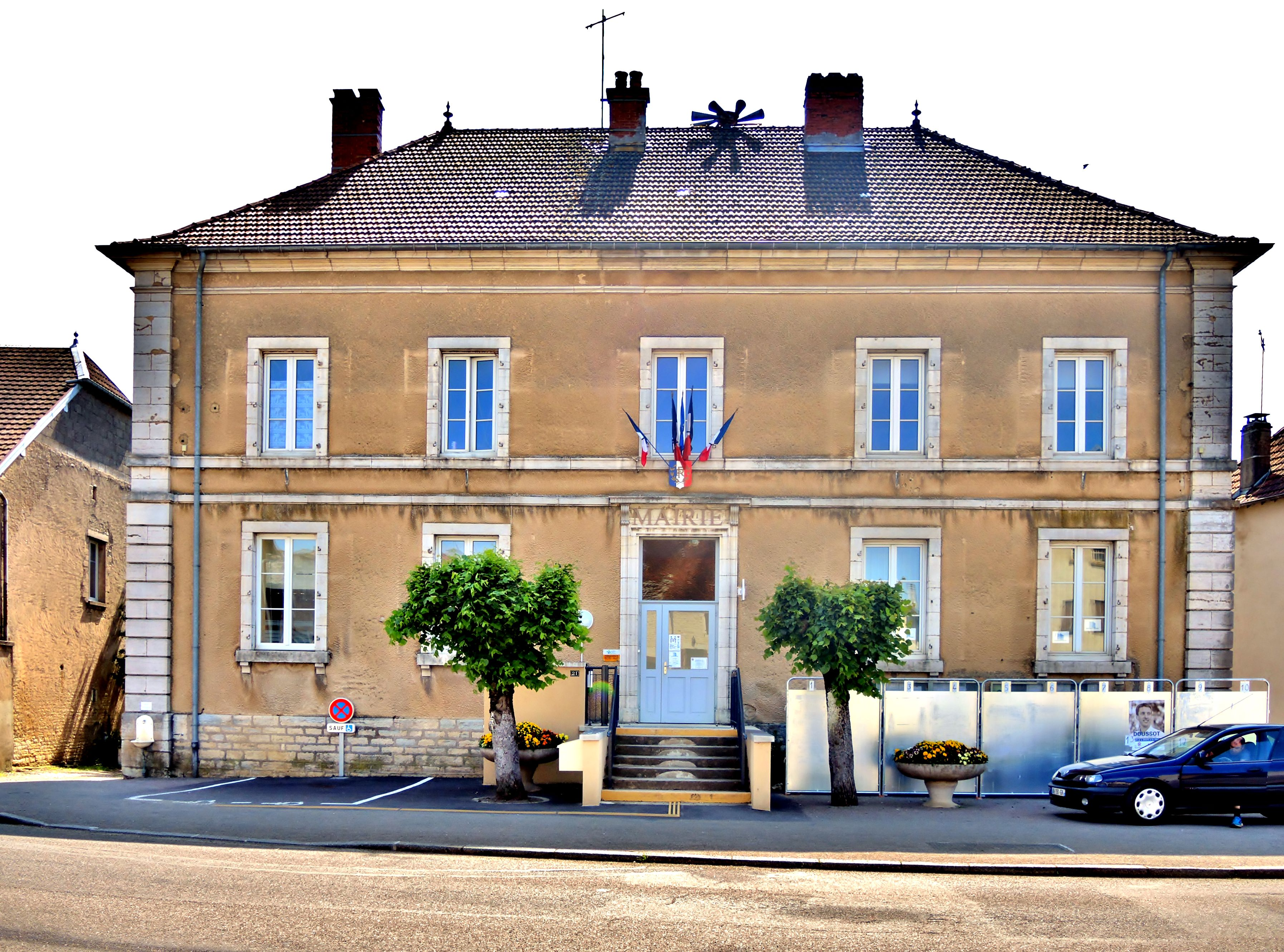
- The town hall in Fretigney

- Coat of arms
- Location of Fretigney-et-Velloreille
- Location within France Location within Bourgogne-Franche-Comté
- Coordinates: 47°29′20″N 5°56′49″E
- Country: France
- Region: Bourgogne-Franche-Comté
- Department: Haute-Saône
- Arrondissement: Vesoul
- Canton: Scey-sur-Saône-et-Saint-Albin
- Area^{1}: 22.02 km^{2} (8.50 sq mi)
- Highest elevation: 403 m (1,322 ft)
- Lowest elevation: 222 m (728 ft)
- Population (2023): 764
  - Density: 34.7/km^{2} (89.9/sq mi)
- Time zone: UTC+01:00 (CET)
  - Summer (DST): UTC+02:00 (CEST)
- INSEE/Postal code: 70257 /70130
- ^{1} French Land Register data, which excludes lakes, ponds, glaciers > 1 km^{2} (0.386 sq mi or 247 acres) and river estuaries.

Fretigney-et-Velloreille is a commune in the Haute-Saône department in the region of Bourgogne-Franche-Comté in eastern France.

== See also ==
- Communes of the Haute-Saône department
