= Rosey, Haute-Saône =

Rosey
- Commune
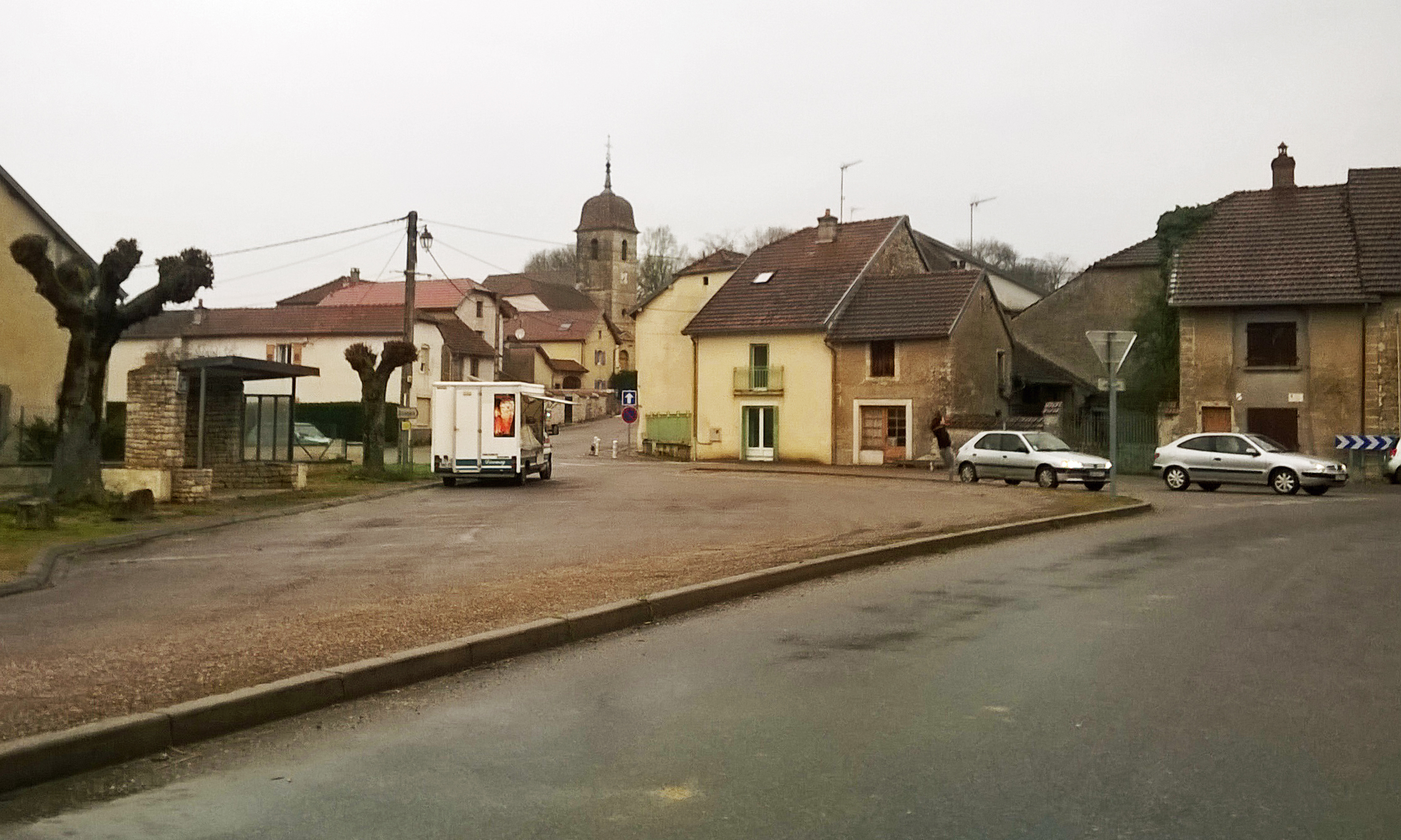
- The church and surroundings in Rosey

- Coat of arms
- Location of Rosey
- Location within France Location within Bourgogne-Franche-Comté
- Coordinates: 47°33′59″N 6°01′42″E
- Country: France
- Region: Bourgogne-Franche-Comté
- Department: Haute-Saône
- Arrondissement: Vesoul
- Canton: Scey-sur-Saône-et-Saint-Albin

Government
  - Mayor (2020–2026): Christophe Rergue
- Area^{1}: 14.64 km^{2} (5.65 sq mi)
- Highest elevation: 371 m (1,217 ft)
- Lowest elevation: 224 m (735 ft)
- Population (2023): 249
  - Density: 17.0/km^{2} (44.1/sq mi)
- Time zone: UTC+01:00 (CET)
  - Summer (DST): UTC+02:00 (CEST)
- INSEE/Postal code: 70452 /70000
- ^{1} French Land Register data, which excludes lakes, ponds, glaciers > 1 km^{2} (0.386 sq mi or 247 acres) and river estuaries.

Rosey (French pronunciation: [ʁozɛ]) is a commune in the Haute-Saône department in the region of Bourgogne-Franche-Comté in eastern France.

== See also ==
- Communes of the Haute-Saône department
