= Aroz =

- Commune
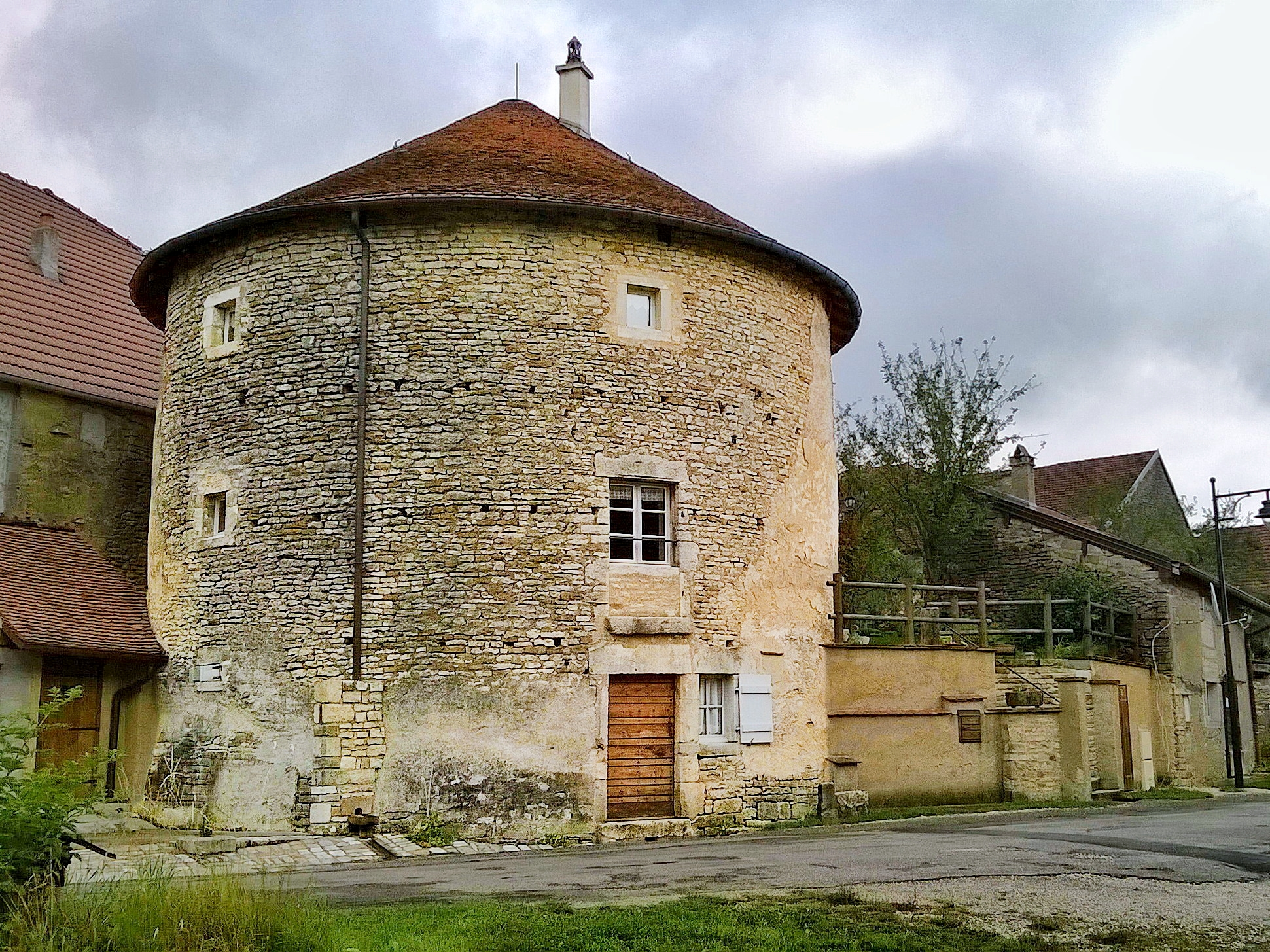
- The Tour de la Dîme in Aroz

- Coat of arms
- Location of Aroz
- Location within France Location within Bourgogne-Franche-Comté
- Coordinates: 47°36′45″N 6°00′08″E
- Country: France
- Region: Bourgogne-Franche-Comté
- Department: Haute-Saône
- Arrondissement: Vesoul
- Canton: Scey-sur-Saône-et-Saint-Albin
- Intercommunality: CC Combes

Government
  - Mayor (2020–2026): Noël Langrognet
- Area^{1}: 6.57 km^{2} (2.54 sq mi)
- Highest elevation: 267 m (876 ft)
- Lowest elevation: 212 m (696 ft)
- Population (2023): 144
  - Density: 21.9/km^{2} (56.8/sq mi)
- Time zone: UTC+01:00 (CET)
  - Summer (DST): UTC+02:00 (CEST)
- INSEE/Postal code: 70028 /70360
- ^{1} French Land Register data, which excludes lakes, ponds, glaciers > 1 km^{2} (0.386 sq mi or 247 acres) and river estuaries.

Aroz is a commune in the Haute-Saône department in the region of Bourgogne-Franche-Comté in eastern France.

== See also ==
- Communes of the Haute-Saône department
