= Ferrières-lès-Scey =

- Commune
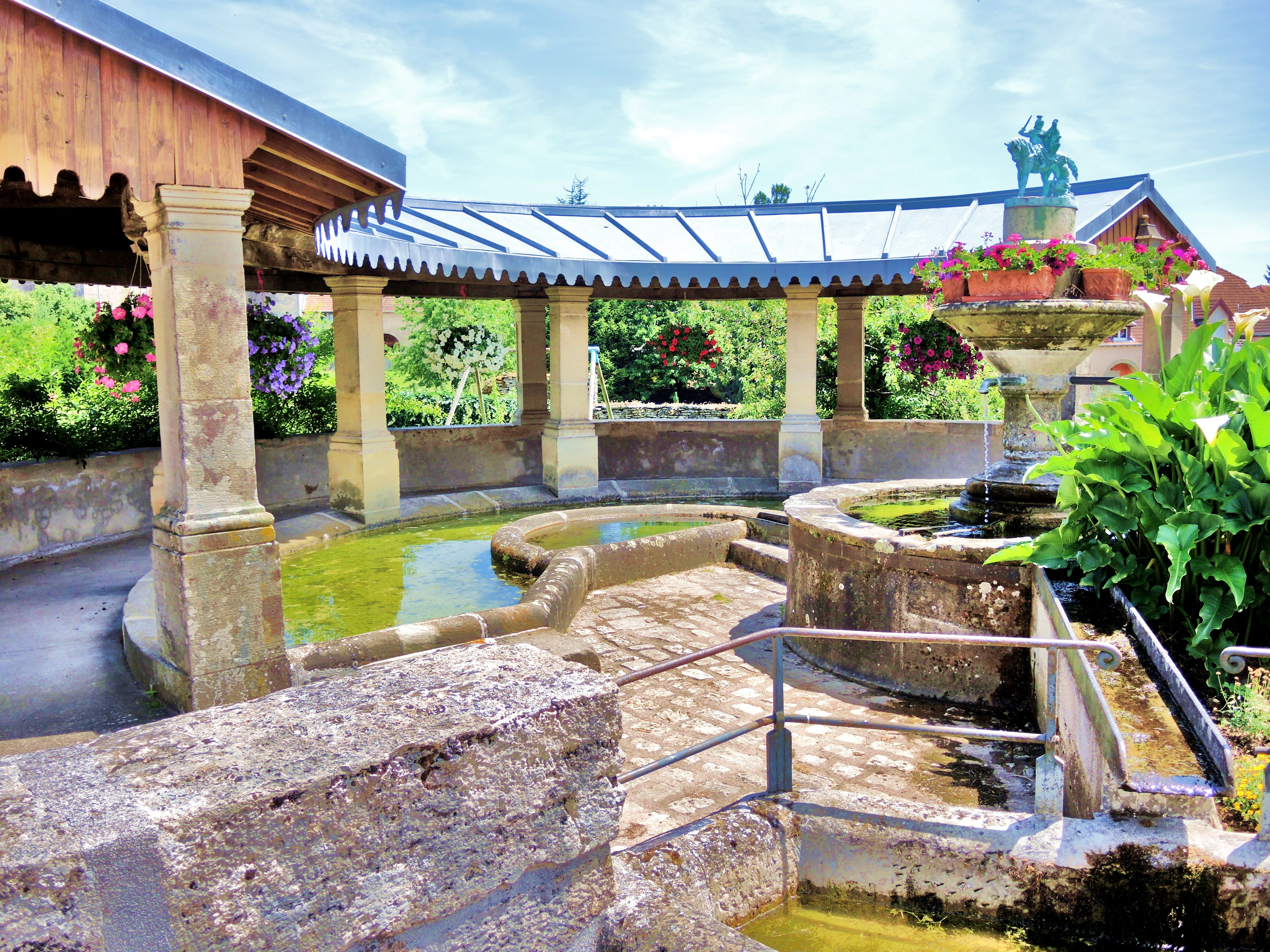
- The wash house in Ferrières-lès-Scey
- Location of Ferrières-lès-Scey
- Location within France Location within Bourgogne-Franche-Comté
- Coordinates: 47°39′24″N 6°00′19″E
- Country: France
- Region: Bourgogne-Franche-Comté
- Department: Haute-Saône
- Arrondissement: Vesoul
- Canton: Scey-sur-Saône-et-Saint-Albin

Government
  - Mayor (2020–2026): Jean-Jacques Millerand
- Area^{1}: 6.20 km^{2} (2.39 sq mi)
- Highest elevation: 322 m (1,056 ft)
- Lowest elevation: 205 m (673 ft)
- Population (2023): 132
  - Density: 21.3/km^{2} (55.1/sq mi)
- Time zone: UTC+01:00 (CET)
  - Summer (DST): UTC+02:00 (CEST)
- INSEE/Postal code: 70232 /70360
- ^{1} French Land Register data, which excludes lakes, ponds, glaciers > 1 km^{2} (0.386 sq mi or 247 acres) and river estuaries.

Ferrières-lès-Scey (French pronunciation: [fɛʁjɛʁ lɛ sɛ], literally Ferrières near Scey) is a commune in the Haute-Saône department in the region of Bourgogne-Franche-Comté in eastern France.

== See also ==
- Communes of the Haute-Saône department
