= Pontcey =

- Commune
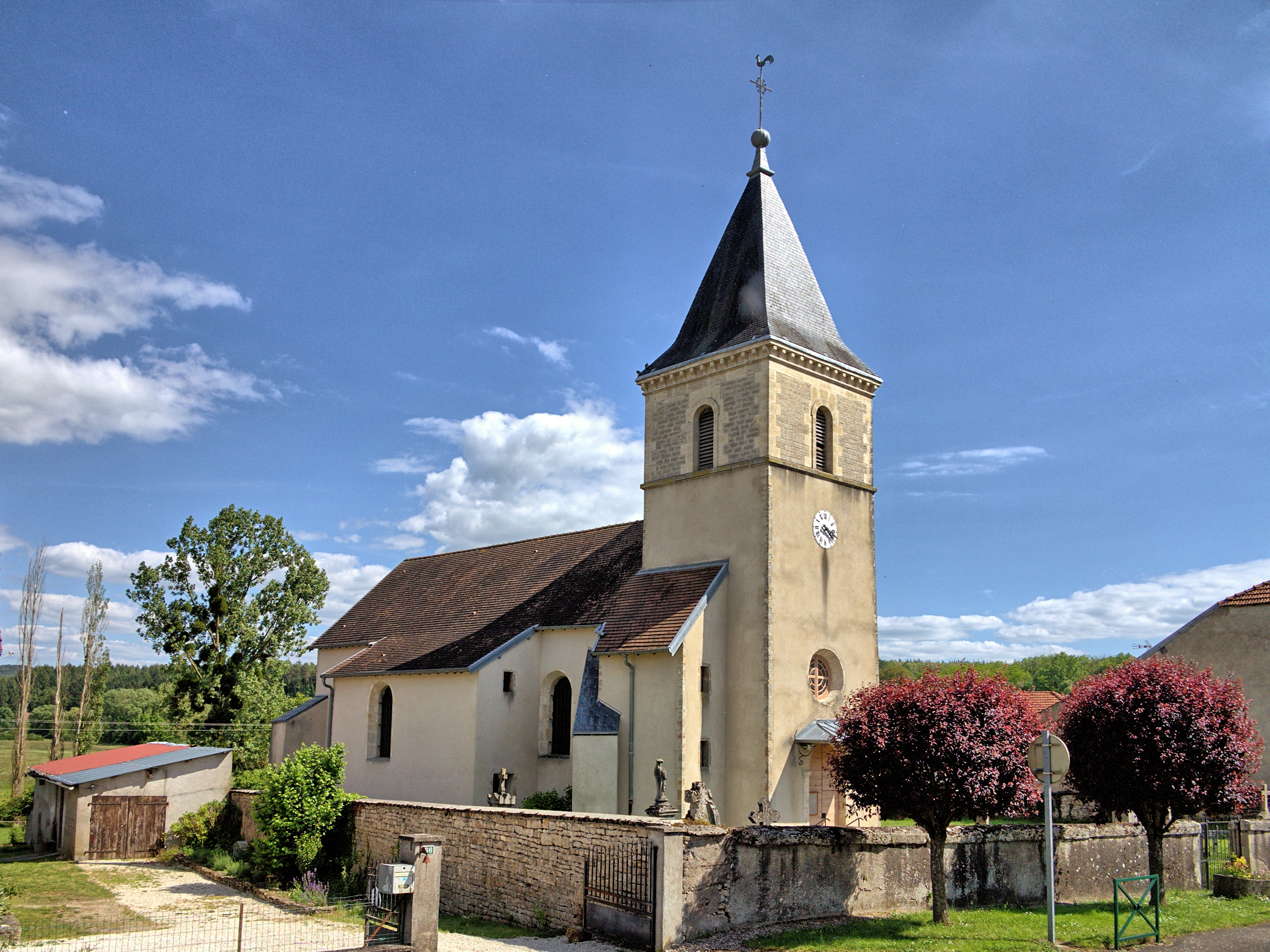
- The church in Pontcey

- Coat of arms
- Location of Pontcey
- Location within France Location within Bourgogne-Franche-Comté
- Coordinates: 47°37′54″N 6°01′50″E
- Country: France
- Region: Bourgogne-Franche-Comté
- Department: Haute-Saône
- Arrondissement: Vesoul
- Canton: Scey-sur-Saône-et-Saint-Albin

Government
  - Mayor (2020–2026): Jacky Bague
- Area^{1}: 5.87 km^{2} (2.27 sq mi)
- Highest elevation: 267 m (876 ft)
- Lowest elevation: 210 m (690 ft)
- Population (2023): 291
  - Density: 49.6/km^{2} (128/sq mi)
- Time zone: UTC+01:00 (CET)
  - Summer (DST): UTC+02:00 (CEST)
- INSEE/Postal code: 70417 /70360
- ^{1} French Land Register data, which excludes lakes, ponds, glaciers > 1 km^{2} (0.386 sq mi or 247 acres) and river estuaries.

Pontcey (French pronunciation: [pɔ̃sɛ]) is a commune in the Haute-Saône department in the region of Bourgogne-Franche-Comté in eastern France.

== See also ==
- Communes of the Haute-Saône department
