= Bourguignon-lès-la-Charité =

- Commune
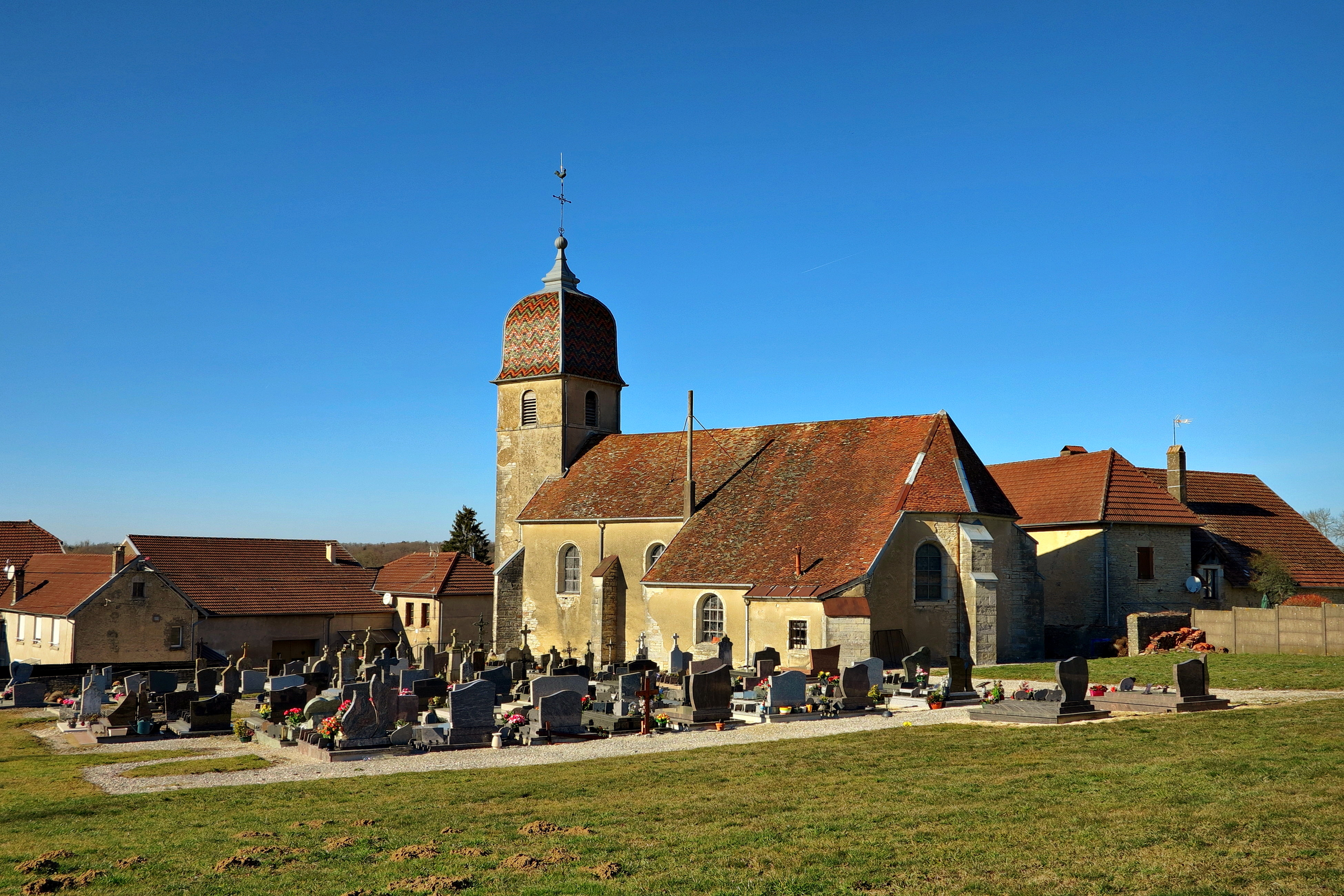
- The church in Bourguignon-lès-la-Charité

- Coat of arms
- Location of Bourguignon-lès-la-Charité
- Location within France Location within Bourgogne-Franche-Comté
- Coordinates: 47°30′28″N 5°58′16″E
- Country: France
- Region: Bourgogne-Franche-Comté
- Department: Haute-Saône
- Arrondissement: Vesoul
- Canton: Scey-sur-Saône-et-Saint-Albin

Government
  - Mayor (2020–2026): Claude Rousselet
- Area^{1}: 4.25 km^{2} (1.64 sq mi)
- Highest elevation: 251 m (823 ft)
- Lowest elevation: 221 m (725 ft)
- Population (2023): 99
  - Density: 23/km^{2} (60/sq mi)
- Time zone: UTC+01:00 (CET)
  - Summer (DST): UTC+02:00 (CEST)
- INSEE/Postal code: 70088 /70190
- ^{1} French Land Register data, which excludes lakes, ponds, glaciers > 1 km^{2} (0.386 sq mi or 247 acres) and river estuaries.

Bourguignon-lès-la-Charité (French pronunciation: [buʁɡiɲɔ̃ lɛ la ʃaʁite]) is a commune in the Haute-Saône department in the region of Bourgogne-Franche-Comté in eastern France.

== See also ==
- Communes of the Haute-Saône department
