= Vellemoz =

- Commune
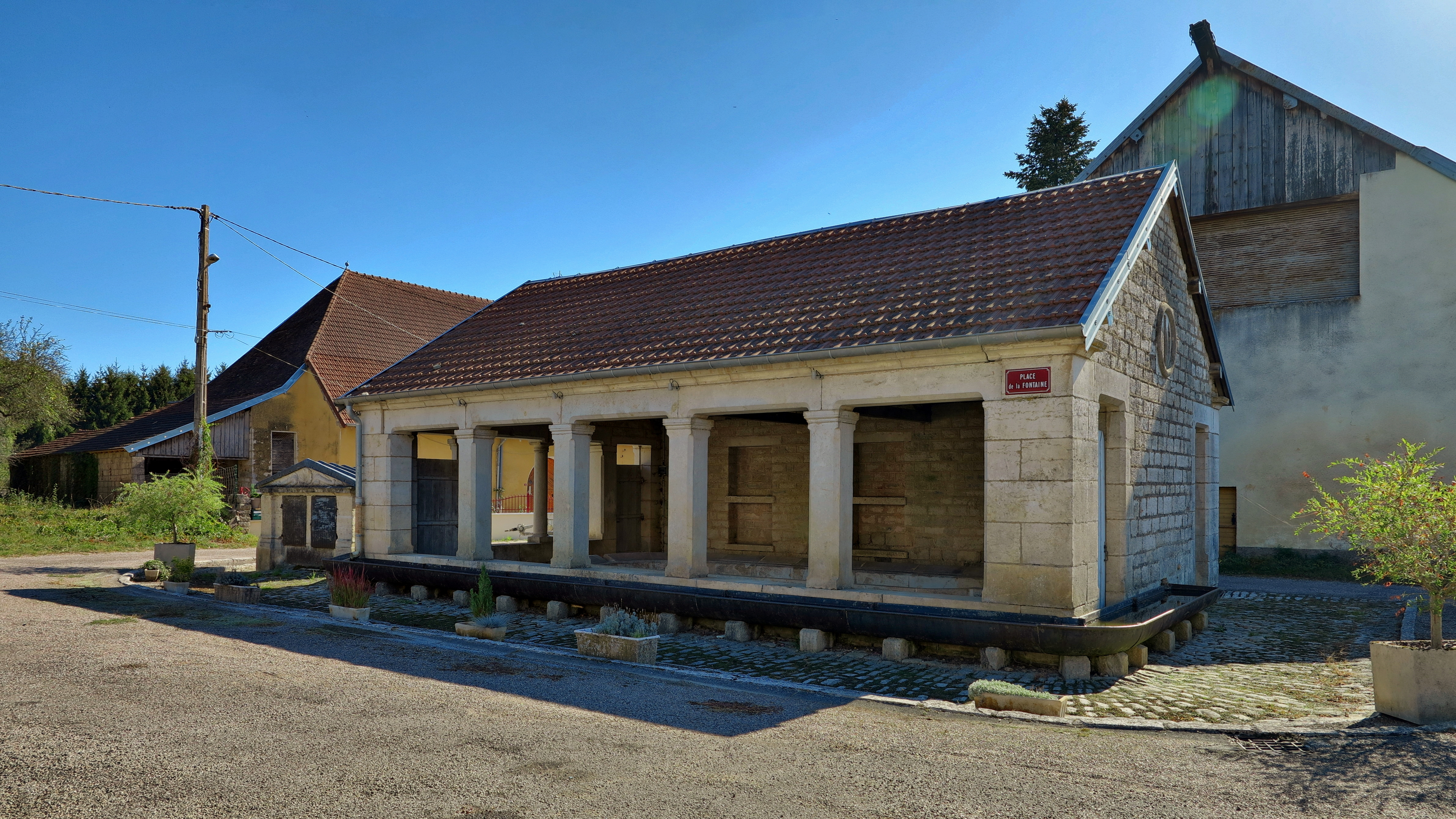
- The wash house in Vellemoz
- Location of Vellemoz
- Location within France Location within Bourgogne-Franche-Comté
- Coordinates: 47°28′29″N 5°47′43″E
- Country: France
- Region: Bourgogne-Franche-Comté
- Department: Haute-Saône
- Arrondissement: Vesoul
- Canton: Scey-sur-Saône-et-Saint-Albin
- Area^{1}: 4.20 km^{2} (1.62 sq mi)
- Highest elevation: 254 m (833 ft)
- Lowest elevation: 207 m (679 ft)
- Population (2023): 87
  - Density: 21/km^{2} (54/sq mi)
- Time zone: UTC+01:00 (CET)
  - Summer (DST): UTC+02:00 (CEST)
- INSEE/Postal code: 70538 /70700
- ^{1} French Land Register data, which excludes lakes, ponds, glaciers > 1 km^{2} (0.386 sq mi or 247 acres) and river estuaries.

Vellemoz is a commune in the Haute-Saône department in the region of Bourgogne-Franche-Comté in eastern France.

== See also ==
- Communes of the Haute-Saône department
