= Saint-Gand =

- Commune
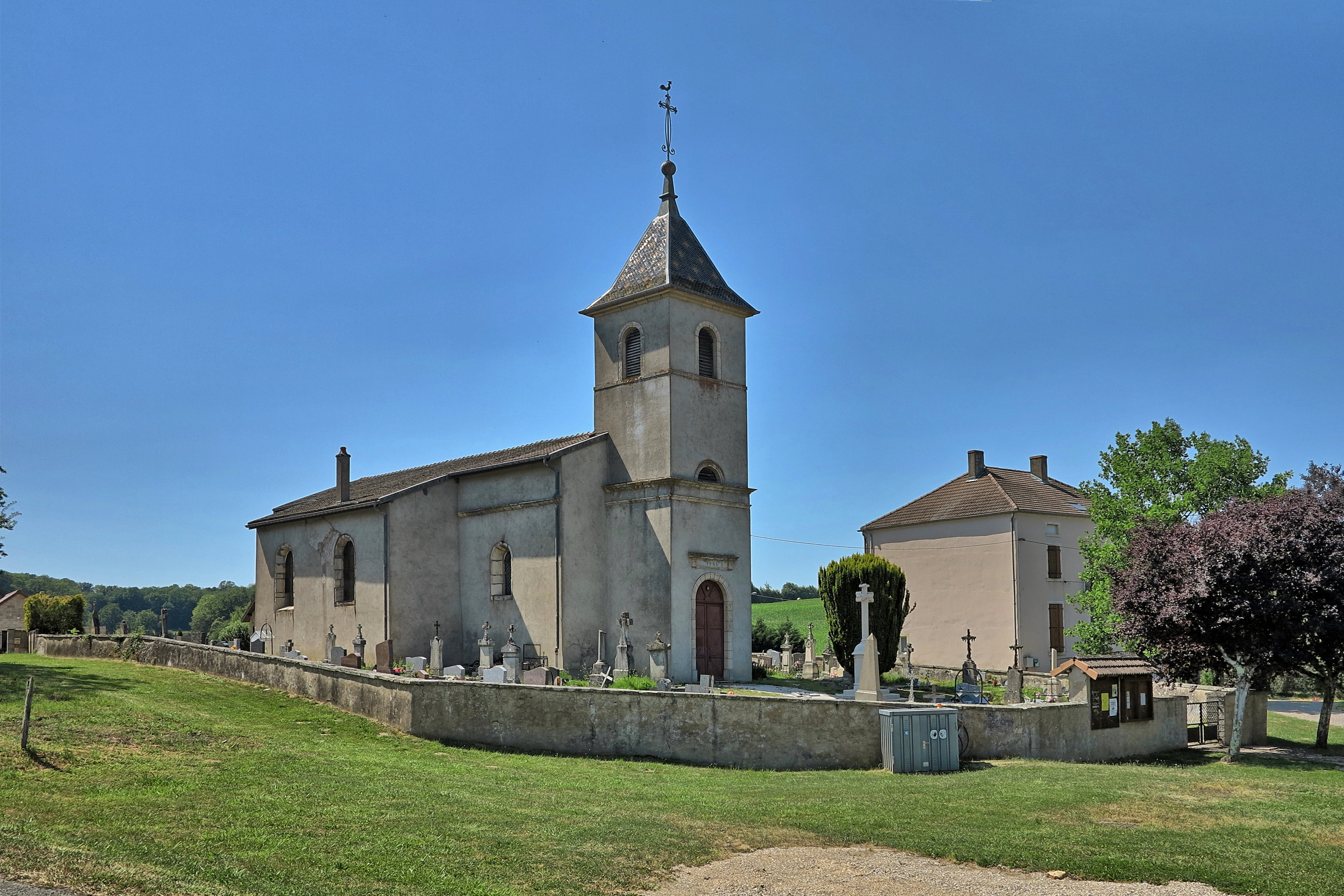
- The church in Saint-Gand
- Location of Saint-Gand
- Location within France Location within Bourgogne-Franche-Comté
- Coordinates: 47°31′02″N 5°51′00″E
- Country: France
- Region: Bourgogne-Franche-Comté
- Department: Haute-Saône
- Arrondissement: Vesoul
- Canton: Scey-sur-Saône-et-Saint-Albin

Government
  - Mayor (2020–2026): Stéphanie Franchet
- Area^{1}: 15.83 km^{2} (6.11 sq mi)
- Highest elevation: 264 m (866 ft)
- Lowest elevation: 216 m (709 ft)
- Population (2023): 138
  - Density: 8.72/km^{2} (22.6/sq mi)
- Time zone: UTC+01:00 (CET)
  - Summer (DST): UTC+02:00 (CEST)
- INSEE/Postal code: 70463 /70130
- ^{1} French Land Register data, which excludes lakes, ponds, glaciers > 1 km^{2} (0.386 sq mi or 247 acres) and river estuaries.

Saint-Gand (French pronunciation: [sɛ̃ ɡɑ̃]) is a commune in the Haute-Saône department in the region of Bourgogne-Franche-Comté in eastern France.

== See also ==
- Communes of the Haute-Saône department
