= Aboncourt =

Aboncourt may refer to one of the following places in France:

- Aboncourt, Meurthe-et-Moselle, a commune of the Meurthe-et-Moselle département
- Aboncourt, Moselle, a commune of the Moselle département
- Aboncourt-Gesincourt, a commune of the Haute-Saône département
- Aboncourt-sur-Seille, a commune of the Moselle département

== See also ==
- Abancourt (disambiguation)
- Auboncourt-Vauzelles, a commune in the Ardennes 'department
