= Aisey =

Aisey may refer to several communes in France:

- Aisey-et-Richecourt, in the Haute-Saône department
- Aisey-sur-Seine, in the Côte-d'Or department
