= Vieil =

Vieil may refer to:

- Ainay-le-Vieil, commune in the Cher department in central France
- Chauvirey-le-Vieil, village and commune in the Haute-Saône département, in the French region of Franche-Comté
- Gissey-le-Vieil, commune in the Côte-d'Or department in eastern France
- Le Vieil-Évreux, commune in the Eure department and Haute-Normandie region of France
- Le Vieil-Baugé, commune in the Maine-et-Loire department in western France
- Le Vieil-Dampierre, commune in the Marne department in northeastern France
- Pithiviers-le-Vieil, commune in the Loiret department in north-central France
- Rosoy-le-Vieil, commune in the Loiret department in north-central France
- Saint-Florent-le-Vieil, commune in the Maine-et-Loire department in western France
- Saint-Martin-le-Vieil, commune in the Aude department in southern France
- Saint-Maurice-le-Vieil, commune in the Yonne département, in the French region of Bourgogne
- Vendin-le-Vieil, commune in the Pas-de-Calais department in the Nord-Pas-de-Calais region of France
- Vieil-Hesdin, commune in the Pas-de-Calais department in the Nord-Pas-de-Calais region of France
- Vieil-Moutier, commune in the Pas-de-Calais department in the Nord-Pas-de-Calais region of France
