= Arrondissement of Vesoul =

Coordinates: 47°37′N 6°09′E

Vesoul
- Arrondissement
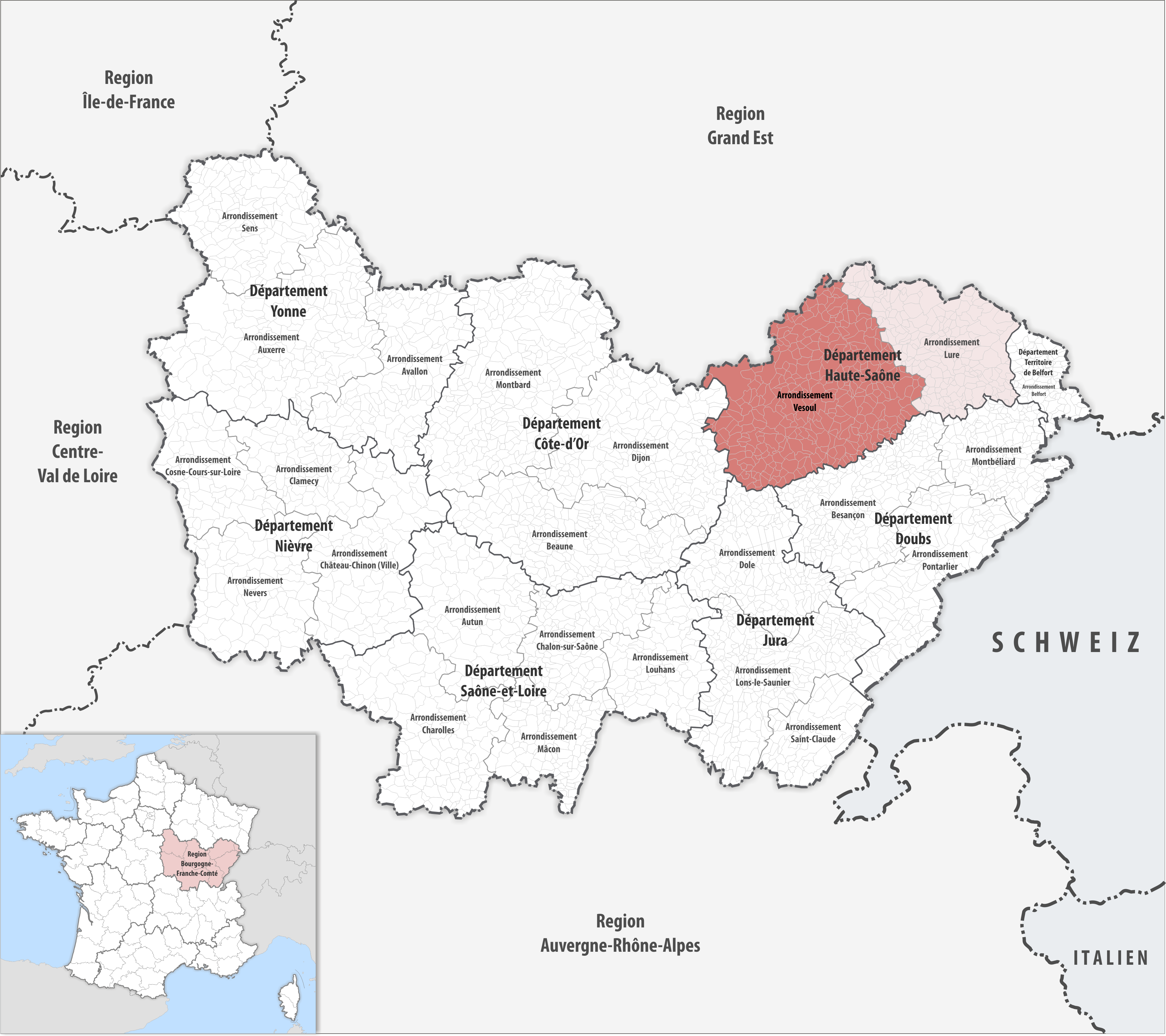
- Location within the region Bourgogne-Franche-Comté
- Country: France
- Region: Bourgogne-Franche-Comté
- Department: Haute-Saône
- No. of communes: {{{nbcomm}}}
- Area: 3,467.8 km^{2} (1,338.9 sq mi)
- Population (2023): 127,193
  - Density: 36.678/km^{2} (94.996/sq mi)
- INSEE code: 702

The arrondissement of Vesoul is an arrondissement of France in the Haute-Saône department in the Bourgogne-Franche-Comté region. It has 346 communes. Its population is 127,637 (2021), and its area is 3,467.8 km^{2} (1,338.9 sq mi).

== Composition ==
The communes of the arrondissement of Vesoul, and their INSEE codes, are:

1. Aboncourt-Gesincourt (70002)
2. Achey (70003)
3. Aisey-et-Richecourt (70009)
4. Amance (70012)
5. Amoncourt (70015)
6. Anchenoncourt-et-Chazel (70017)
7. Ancier (70018)
8. Andelarre (70019)
9. Andelarrot (70020)
10. Angirey (70022)
11. Apremont (70024)
12. Arbecey (70025)
13. Arc-lès-Gray (70026)
14. Argillières (70027)
15. Aroz (70028)
16. Arsans (70030)
17. Attricourt (70032)
18. Augicourt (70035)
19. Aulx-lès-Cromary (70036)
20. Autet (70037)
21. Authoison (70038)
22. Autoreille (70039)
23. Autrey-lès-Cerre (70040)
24. Autrey-lès-Gray (70041)
25. Auvet-et-la-Chapelotte (70043)
26. Auxon (70044)
27. Avrigney-Virey (70045)
28. Baignes (70047)
29. Bard-lès-Pesmes (70048)
30. Barges (70049)
31. La Barre (70050)
32. Les Bâties (70053)
33. Battrans (70054)
34. Baulay (70056)
35. Bay (70057)
36. Beaujeu-Saint-Vallier-Pierrejux-et-Quitteur (70058)
37. Beaumotte-Aubertans (70059)
38. Beaumotte-lès-Pin (70060)
39. Besnans (70065)
40. Betaucourt (70066)
41. Betoncourt-sur-Mance (70070)
42. Blondefontaine (70074)
43. Bonboillon (70075)
44. Bonnevent-Velloreille (70076)
45. Borey (70077)
46. Bougey (70078)
47. Bougnon (70079)
48. Bouhans-et-Feurg (70080)
49. Bouhans-lès-Montbozon (70082)
50. Boulot (70084)
51. Boult (70085)
52. Bourbévelle (70086)
53. Bourguignon-lès-Conflans (70087)
54. Bourguignon-lès-la-Charité (70088)
55. Bourguignon-lès-Morey (70089)
56. Boursières (70090)
57. Bousseraucourt (70091)
58. Bresilley (70092)
59. Breurey-lès-Faverney (70095)
60. Brotte-lès-Ray (70099)
61. Broye-Aubigney-Montseugny (70101)
62. Broye-les-Loups-et-Verfontaine (70100)
63. Brussey (70102)
64. Bucey-lès-Gy (70104)
65. Bucey-lès-Traves (70105)
66. Buffignécourt (70106)
67. Bussières (70107)
68. Buthiers (70109)
69. Calmoutier (70111)
70. Cemboing (70112)
71. Cenans (70113)
72. Cendrecourt (70114)
73. Cerre-lès-Noroy (70115)
74. Chambornay-lès-Bellevaux (70118)
75. Chambornay-lès-Pin (70119)
76. Champlitte (70122)
77. Champtonnay (70124)
78. Champvans (70125)
79. Chancey (70126)
80. Chantes (70127)
81. La Chapelle-Saint-Quillain (70129)
82. Charcenne (70130)
83. Chargey-lès-Gray (70132)
84. Chargey-lès-Port (70133)
85. Chariez (70134)
86. Charmes-Saint-Valbert (70135)
87. Charmoille (70136)
88. Chassey-lès-Montbozon (70137)
89. Chassey-lès-Scey (70138)
90. Chaumercenne (70142)
91. Chauvirey-le-Châtel (70143)
92. Chauvirey-le-Vieil (70144)
93. Chaux-la-Lotière (70145)
94. Chaux-lès-Port (70146)
95. Chemilly (70148)
96. Chenevrey-et-Morogne (70150)
97. Chevigney (70151)
98. Cintrey (70153)
99. Cirey (70154)
100. Citey (70156)
101. Clans (70158)
102. Cognières (70159)
103. Colombe-lès-Vesoul (70162)
104. Colombier (70163)
105. Colombine (70152)
106. Colombotte (70164)
107. Combeaufontaine (70165)
108. Comberjon (70166)
109. Conflandey (70167)
110. Confracourt (70169)
111. Contréglise (70170)
112. Cordonnet (70174)
113. Cornot (70175)
114. Corre (70177)
115. Coulevon (70179)
116. Courcuire (70181)
117. Courtesoult-et-Gatey (70183)
118. Cresancey (70185)
119. Cromary (70189)
120. Cubry-lès-Faverney (70190)
121. Cugney (70192)
122. Cult (70193)
123. Dampierre-sur-Linotte (70197)
124. Dampierre-sur-Salon (70198)
125. Dampvalley-lès-Colombe (70199)
126. Delain (70201)
127. La Demie (70203)
128. Denèvre (70204)
129. Échenoz-la-Méline (70207)
130. Échenoz-le-Sec (70208)
131. Écuelle (70211)
132. Équevilley (70214)
133. Esmoulins (70218)
134. Essertenne-et-Cecey (70220)
135. Étrelles-et-la-Montbleuse (70222)
136. Étuz (70224)
137. Fahy-lès-Autrey (70225)
138. Faverney (70228)
139. Fédry (70230)
140. Ferrières-lès-Ray (70231)
141. Ferrières-lès-Scey (70232)
142. Filain (70234)
143. Flagy (70235)
144. Fleurey-lès-Faverney (70236)
145. Fleurey-lès-Lavoncourt (70237)
146. Fondremand (70239)
147. Fontenois-lès-Montbozon (70243)
148. Fouchécourt (70244)
149. Fouvent-Saint-Andoche (70247)
150. Framont (70252)
151. Francourt (70251)
152. Frasne-le-Château (70253)
153. Fresne-Saint-Mamès (70255)
154. Fretigney-et-Velloreille (70257)
155. Frotey-lès-Vesoul (70261)
156. Germigney (70265)
157. Gevigney-et-Mercey (70267)
158. Gézier-et-Fontenelay (70268)
159. Gourgeon (70272)
160. Grandecourt (70274)
161. La Grande-Résie (70443)
162. Grandvelle-et-le-Perrenot (70275)
163. Grattery (70278)
164. Gray (70279)
165. Gray-la-Ville (70280)
166. Gy (70282)
167. Hugier (70286)
168. Hyet (70288)
169. Igny (70289)
170. Jonvelle (70291)
171. Jussey (70292)
172. Lambrey (70293)
173. Larians-et-Munans (70296)
174. Larret (70297)
175. Lavigney (70298)
176. Lavoncourt (70299)
177. Lieffrans (70301)
178. Lieucourt (70302)
179. Liévans (70303)
180. Lœuilley (70305)
181. Loulans-Verchamp (70309)
182. Le Magnoray (70316)
183. Magny-lès-Jussey (70320)
184. Mailley-et-Chazelot (70324)
185. Maizières (70325)
186. La Malachère (70326)
187. Malans (70327)
188. Malvillers (70329)
189. Mantoche (70331)
190. Marnay (70334)
191. Maussans (70335)
192. Melin (70337)
193. Membrey (70340)
194. Menoux (70341)
195. Mercey-sur-Saône (70342)
196. Mersuay (70343)
197. Molay (70350)
198. Mont-Saint-Léger (70369)
199. Mont-le-Vernois (70367)
200. Montagney (70353)
201. Montarlot-lès-Rioz (70355)
202. Montboillon (70356)
203. Montbozon (70357)
204. Montcey (70358)
205. Montcourt (70359)
206. Montigny-lès-Cherlieu (70362)
207. Montigny-lès-Vesoul (70363)
208. Montjustin-et-Velotte (70364)
209. Montot (70368)
210. Montureux-et-Prantigny (70371)
211. Montureux-lès-Baulay (70372)
212. Motey-Besuche (70374)
213. Nantilly (70376)
214. Navenne (70378)
215. Neurey-en-Vaux (70380)
216. Neurey-lès-la-Demie (70381)
217. Neuvelle-lès-Cromary (70383)
218. Neuvelle-lès-la-Charité (70384)
219. La Neuvelle-lès-Scey (70386)
220. Noidans-le-Ferroux (70387)
221. Noidans-lès-Vesoul (70388)
222. Noiron (70389)
223. Noroy-le-Bourg (70390)
224. Oigney (70392)
225. Oiselay-et-Grachaux (70393)
226. Onay (70394)
227. Ormenans (70397)
228. Ormoy (70399)
229. Ouge (70400)
230. Ovanches (70401)
231. Oyrières (70402)
232. Pennesières (70405)
233. Percey-le-Grand (70406)
234. Perrouse (70407)
235. Pesmes (70408)
236. Pierrecourt (70409)
237. Pin (70410)
238. Polaincourt-et-Clairefontaine (70415)
239. Pontcey (70417)
240. Port-sur-Saône (70421)
241. Poyans (70422)
242. Preigney (70423)
243. Provenchère (70426)
244. Purgerot (70427)
245. Pusey (70428)
246. Pusy-et-Épenoux (70429)
247. La Quarte (70430)
248. Quenoche (70431)
249. Quincey (70433)
250. Raincourt (70436)
251. Ranzevelle (70437)
252. Ray-sur-Saône (70438)
253. Raze (70439)
254. Recologne (70440)
255. Recologne-lès-Rioz (70441)
256. Renaucourt (70442)
257. La Résie-Saint-Martin (70444)
258. Rigny (70446)
259. Rioz (70447)
260. Roche-et-Raucourt (70448)
261. La Rochelle (70450)
262. La Roche-Morey (70373)
263. Roche-sur-Linotte-et-Sorans-les-Cordiers (70449)
264. La Romaine (70418)
265. Rosey (70452)
266. Rosières-sur-Mance (70454)
267. Ruhans (70456)
268. Rupt-sur-Saône (70457)
269. Saint-Broing (70461)
270. Saint-Gand (70463)
271. Saint-Loup-Nantouard (70466)
272. Saint-Marcel (70468)
273. Saint-Rémy-en-Comté (70472)
274. Sainte-Reine (70471)
275. Saponcourt (70476)
276. Sauvigney-lès-Gray (70479)
277. Sauvigney-lès-Pesmes (70480)
278. Savoyeux (70481)
279. Scey-sur-Saône-et-Saint-Albin (70482)
280. Scye (70483)
281. Semmadon (70486)
282. Senoncourt (70488)
283. Seveux-Motey (70491)
284. Soing-Cubry-Charentenay (70492)
285. Sorans-lès-Breurey (70493)
286. Sornay (70494)
287. Tartécourt (70496)
288. Theuley (70499)
289. Thieffrans (70500)
290. Thiénans (70501)
291. Tincey-et-Pontrebeau (70502)
292. Traitiéfontaine (70503)
293. Traves (70504)
294. Le Tremblois (70505)
295. Tromarey (70509)
296. Trésilley (70507)
297. Vadans (70510)
298. Vaite (70511)
299. Vaivre-et-Montoille (70513)
300. Valay (70514)
301. Vallerois-Lorioz (70517)
302. Vallerois-le-Bois (70516)
303. Le Val-Saint-Éloi (70518)
304. Vandelans (70519)
305. Vanne (70520)
306. Vantoux-et-Longevelle (70521)
307. Varogne (70522)
308. Vars (70523)
309. Vauchoux (70524)
310. Vauconcourt-Nervezain (70525)
311. Vaux-le-Moncelot (70527)
312. Velesmes-Échevanne (70528)
313. Velet (70529)
314. Velle-le-Châtel (70536)
315. Velleclaire (70531)
316. Vellefaux (70532)
317. Vellefrey-et-Vellefrange (70533)
318. Vellefrie (70534)
319. Velleguindry-et-Levrecey (70535)
320. Vellemoz (70538)
321. Vellexon-Queutrey-et-Vaudey (70539)
322. Velloreille-lès-Choye (70540)
323. Venisey (70545)
324. Venère (70542)
325. Vereux (70546)
326. Vernois-sur-Mance (70548)
327. La Vernotte (70549)
328. Vesoul (70550)
329. Villars-le-Pautel (70554)
330. La Villeneuve-Bellenoye-et-la-Maize (70558)
331. Villeparois (70559)
332. Villers-Bouton (70560)
333. Villers-Chemin-et-Mont-lès-Étrelles (70366)
334. Villers-Pater (70565)
335. Villers-Vaudey (70568)
336. Villers-le-Sec (70563)
337. Villers-sur-Port (70566)
338. Vilory (70569)
339. Vitrey-sur-Mance (70572)
340. Volon (70574)
341. Voray-sur-l'Ognon (70575)
342. Vougécourt (70576)
343. Vregille (70578)
344. Vy-le-Ferroux (70580)
345. Vy-lès-Filain (70583)
346. Vy-lès-Rupt (70582)

== History ==
The arrondissement of Vesoul was created in 1800. In January 2017 it gained three communes from the arrondissement of Lure, and it lost five communes to the arrondissement of Lure.

As a result of the reorganisation of the cantons of France which came into effect in 2015, the borders of the cantons are no longer related to the borders of the arrondissements. The cantons of the arrondissement of Vesoul were, as of January 2015:

1. Amance
2. Autrey-lès-Gray
3. Champlitte
4. Combeaufontaine
5. Dampierre-sur-Salon
6. Fresne-Saint-Mamès
7. Gray
8. Gy
9. Jussey
10. Marnay
11. Montbozon
12. Noroy-le-Bourg
13. Pesmes
14. Port-sur-Saône
15. Rioz
16. Scey-sur-Saône-et-Saint-Albin
17. Vesoul-Est
18. Vesoul-Ouest
19. Vitrey-sur-Mance
