= Fouchécourt =

Fouchécourt may refer to:

- Fouchécourt, Haute-Saône, a commune in the French region of Franch-Comté
- Fouchécourt, Vosges, a commune in the French region of Lorraine
