= Bourguignon-lès-Morey =

- Commune
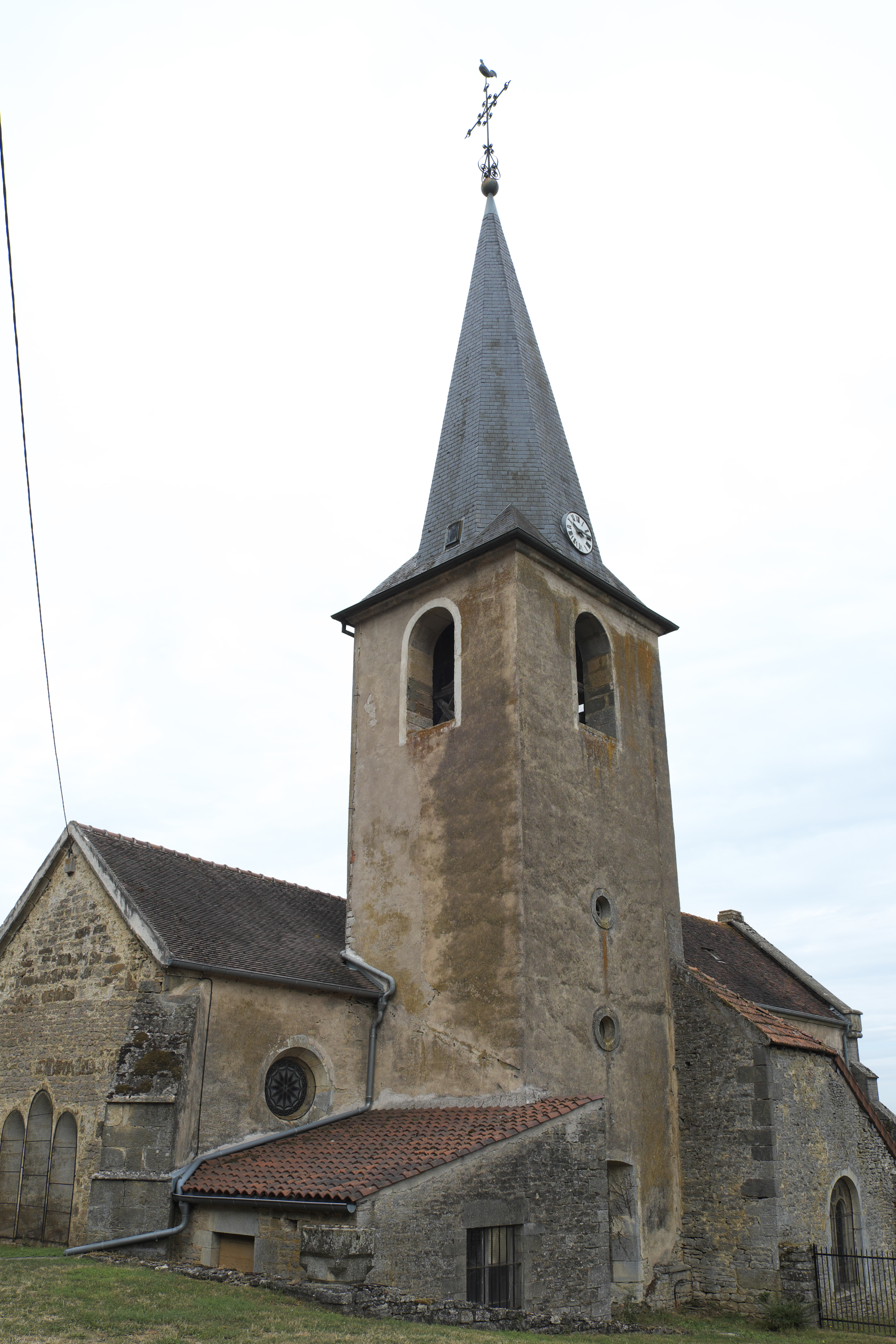
- The church in Bourguignon-lès-Morey
- Location of Bourguignon-lès-Morey
- Location within France Location within Bourgogne-Franche-Comté
- Coordinates: 47°42′36″N 5°42′15″E
- Country: France
- Region: Bourgogne-Franche-Comté
- Department: Haute-Saône
- Arrondissement: Vesoul
- Canton: Jussey

Government
  - Mayor (2020–2026): Éliane Pitavy
- Area^{1}: 9.84 km^{2} (3.80 sq mi)
- Highest elevation: 447 m (1,467 ft)
- Lowest elevation: 249 m (817 ft)
- Population (2023): 43
  - Density: 4.4/km^{2} (11/sq mi)
- Time zone: UTC+01:00 (CET)
  - Summer (DST): UTC+02:00 (CEST)
- INSEE/Postal code: 70089 /70120
- ^{1} French Land Register data, which excludes lakes, ponds, glaciers > 1 km^{2} (0.386 sq mi or 247 acres) and river estuaries.

Bourguignon-lès-Morey (French pronunciation: [buʁɡiɲɔ̃ lɛ mɔʁɛ], literally Bourguignon near Morey) is a commune in the Haute-Saône department in the region of Bourgogne-Franche-Comté in eastern France.

== See also ==
- Communes of the Haute-Saône department
