= Magny-lès-Jussey =

- Commune
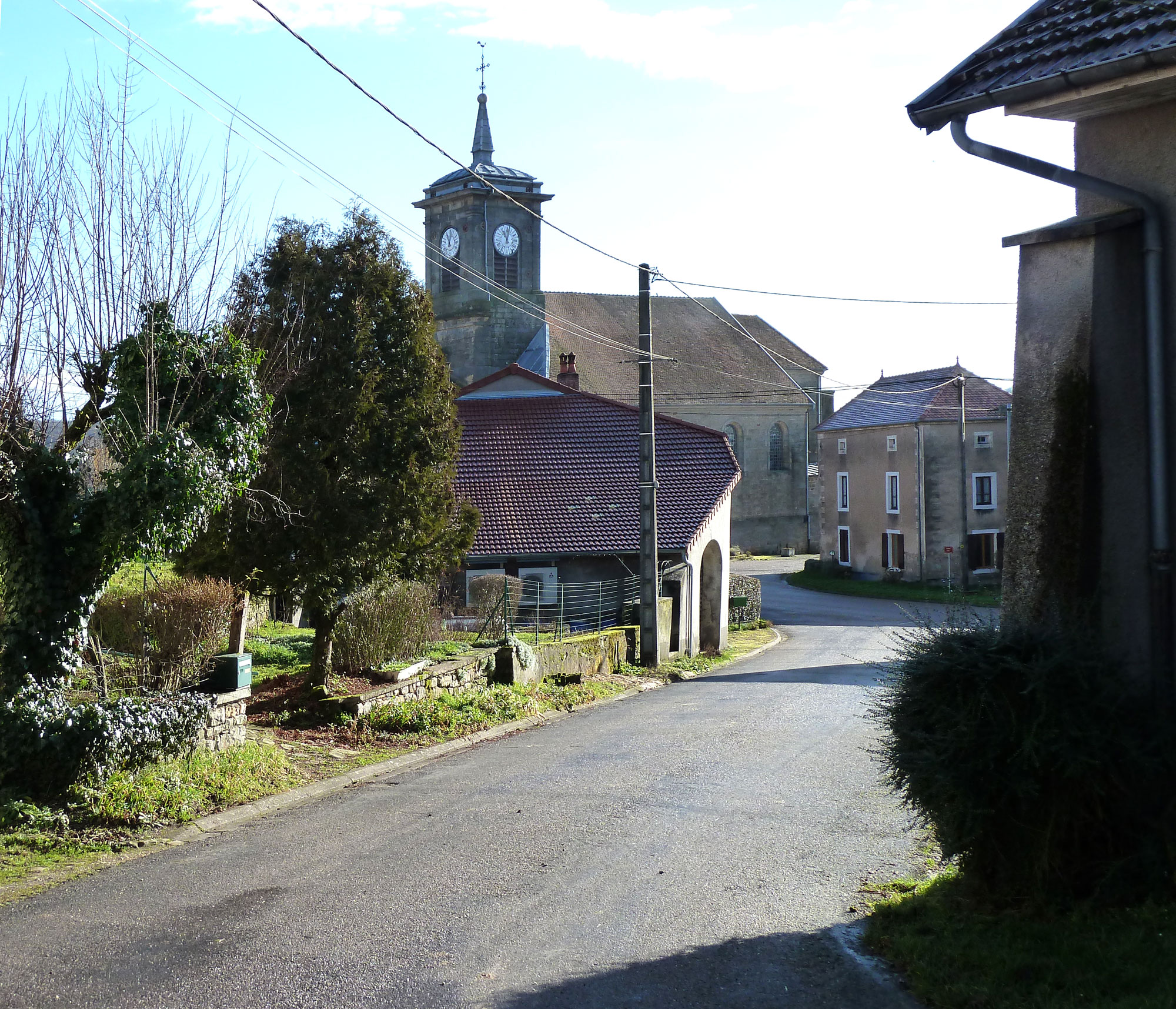
- The church and surroundings in Magny-lès-Jussey
- Location of Magny-lès-Jussey
- Location within France Location within Bourgogne-Franche-Comté
- Coordinates: 47°51′25″N 5°58′46″E
- Country: France
- Region: Bourgogne-Franche-Comté
- Department: Haute-Saône
- Arrondissement: Vesoul
- Canton: Jussey

Government
  - Mayor (2020–2026): Jean-Pol Girod
- Area^{1}: 9.31 km^{2} (3.59 sq mi)
- Highest elevation: 330 m (1,080 ft)
- Lowest elevation: 222 m (728 ft)
- Population (2023): 94
  - Density: 10/km^{2} (26/sq mi)
- Time zone: UTC+01:00 (CET)
  - Summer (DST): UTC+02:00 (CEST)
- INSEE/Postal code: 70320 /70500
- ^{1} French Land Register data, which excludes lakes, ponds, glaciers > 1 km^{2} (0.386 sq mi or 247 acres) and river estuaries.

Magny-lès-Jussey (French pronunciation: [maɲi lɛ ʒysɛ], lit. 'Magny near Jussey') is a commune in the Haute-Saône department in the region of Bourgogne-Franche-Comté in eastern France.

== See also ==
- Communes of the Haute-Saône department
