= Hurecourt =

- Commune
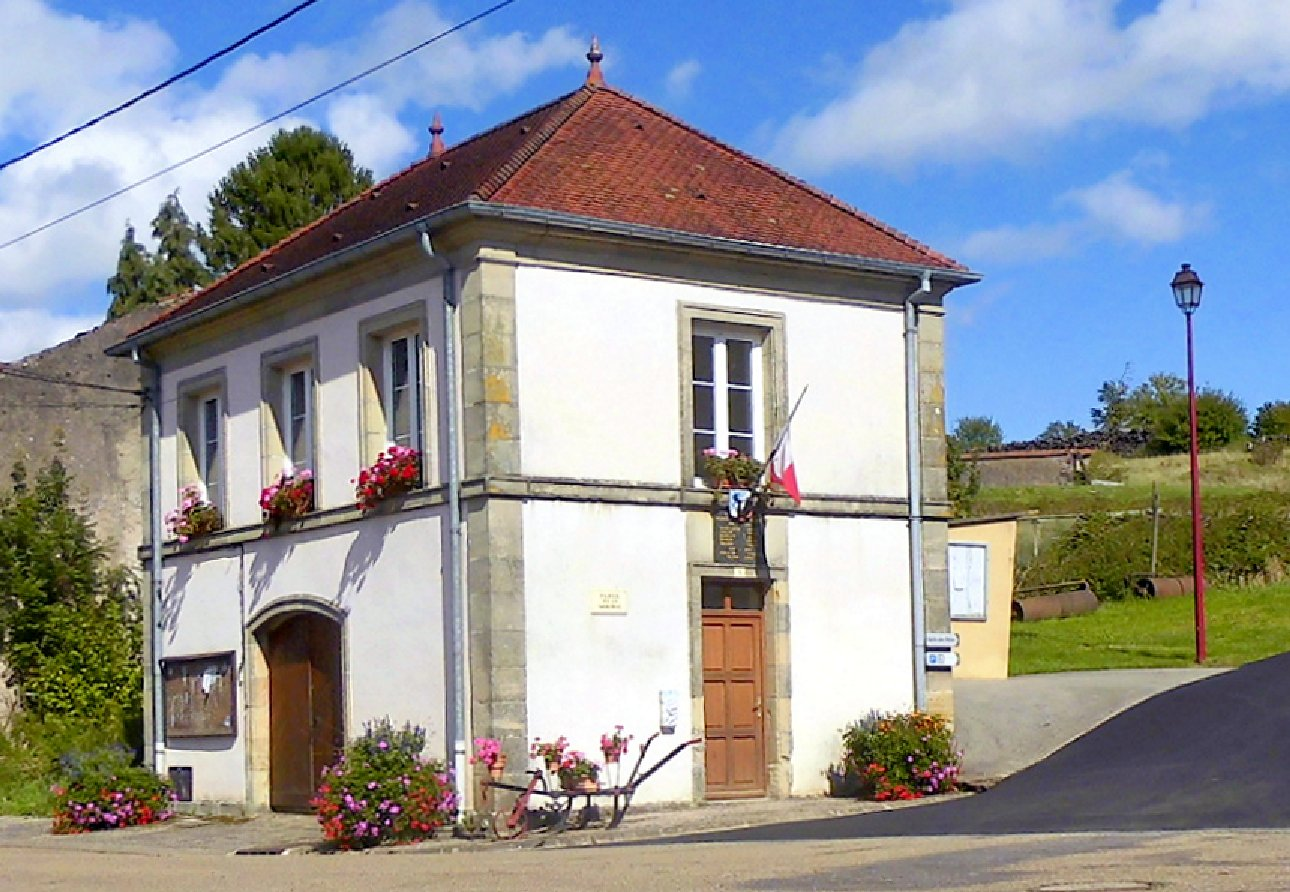
- The town hall in Hurecourt
- Location of Hurecourt
- Location within France Location within Bourgogne-Franche-Comté
- Coordinates: 47°54′14″N 6°03′59″E
- Country: France
- Region: Bourgogne-Franche-Comté
- Department: Haute-Saône
- Arrondissement: Lure
- Canton: Jussey
- Area^{1}: 4.93 km^{2} (1.90 sq mi)
- Highest elevation: 350 m (1,150 ft)
- Lowest elevation: 269 m (883 ft)
- Population (2023): 48
  - Density: 9.7/km^{2} (25/sq mi)
- Time zone: UTC+01:00 (CET)
  - Summer (DST): UTC+02:00 (CEST)
- INSEE/Postal code: 70287 /70210
- ^{1} French Land Register data, which excludes lakes, ponds, glaciers > 1 km^{2} (0.386 sq mi or 247 acres) and river estuaries.

Hurecourt is a commune in the Haute-Saône department in the region of Bourgogne-Franche-Comté in eastern France.

== See also ==
- Communes of the Haute-Saône department
