= La Quarte =

- Commune
- Coat of arms
- Location of La Quarte
- Location within France Location within Bourgogne-Franche-Comté
- Coordinates: 47°46′28″N 5°41′45″E
- Country: France
- Region: Bourgogne-Franche-Comté
- Department: Haute-Saône
- Arrondissement: Vesoul
- Canton: Jussey

Government
  - Mayor (2023–2026): Serge Courtejoie
- Area^{1}: 3.19 km^{2} (1.23 sq mi)
- Highest elevation: 386 m (1,266 ft)
- Lowest elevation: 303 m (994 ft)
- Population (2023): 61
  - Density: 19/km^{2} (50/sq mi)
- Time zone: UTC+01:00 (CET)
  - Summer (DST): UTC+02:00 (CEST)
- INSEE/Postal code: 70430 /70120
- ^{1} French Land Register data, which excludes lakes, ponds, glaciers > 1 km^{2} (0.386 sq mi or 247 acres) and river estuaries.

La Quarte (French pronunciation: [la kaʁt]) is a commune in the Haute-Saône department in the region of Bourgogne-Franche-Comté in eastern France.

== See also ==
- Communes of the Haute-Saône department
