= Cemboing =

- Commune
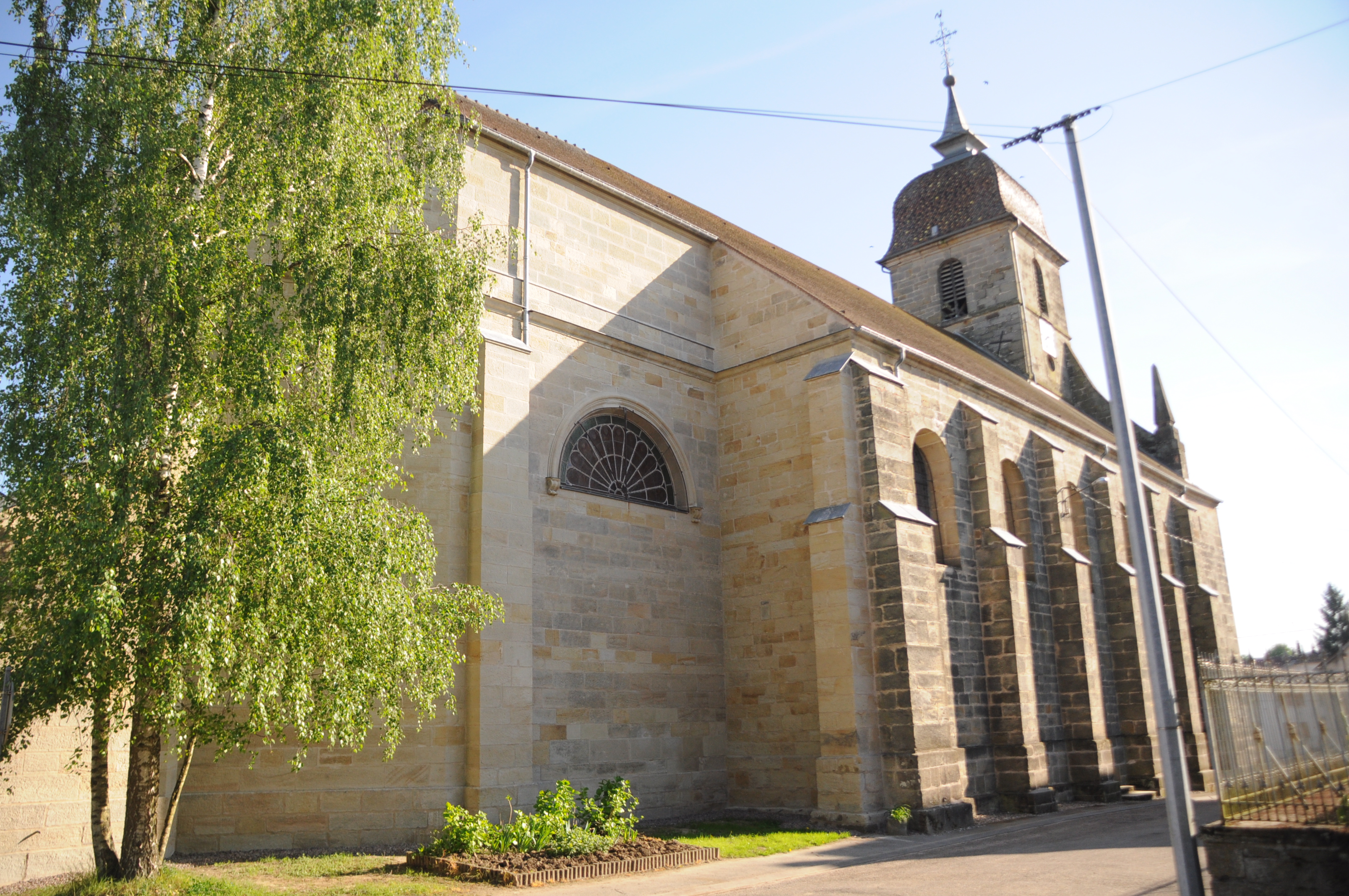
- The church in Cemboing

- Coat of arms
- Location of Cemboing
- Location within France Location within Bourgogne-Franche-Comté
- Coordinates: 47°50′34″N 5°51′25″E
- Country: France
- Region: Bourgogne-Franche-Comté
- Department: Haute-Saône
- Arrondissement: Vesoul
- Canton: Jussey

Government
  - Mayor (2023–2026): Evelyne Grandjean
- Area^{1}: 10.51 km^{2} (4.06 sq mi)
- Highest elevation: 312 m (1,024 ft)
- Lowest elevation: 217 m (712 ft)
- Population (2023): 166
  - Density: 15.8/km^{2} (40.9/sq mi)
- Time zone: UTC+01:00 (CET)
  - Summer (DST): UTC+02:00 (CEST)
- INSEE/Postal code: 70112 /70500
- ^{1} French Land Register data, which excludes lakes, ponds, glaciers > 1 km^{2} (0.386 sq mi or 247 acres) and river estuaries.

Cemboing (French pronunciation: [sɑ̃bwɛ̃]) is a commune in the Haute-Saône department in the region of Bourgogne-Franche-Comté in eastern France.

== See also ==
- Communes of the Haute-Saône department
