= Jonvelle =

- Commune
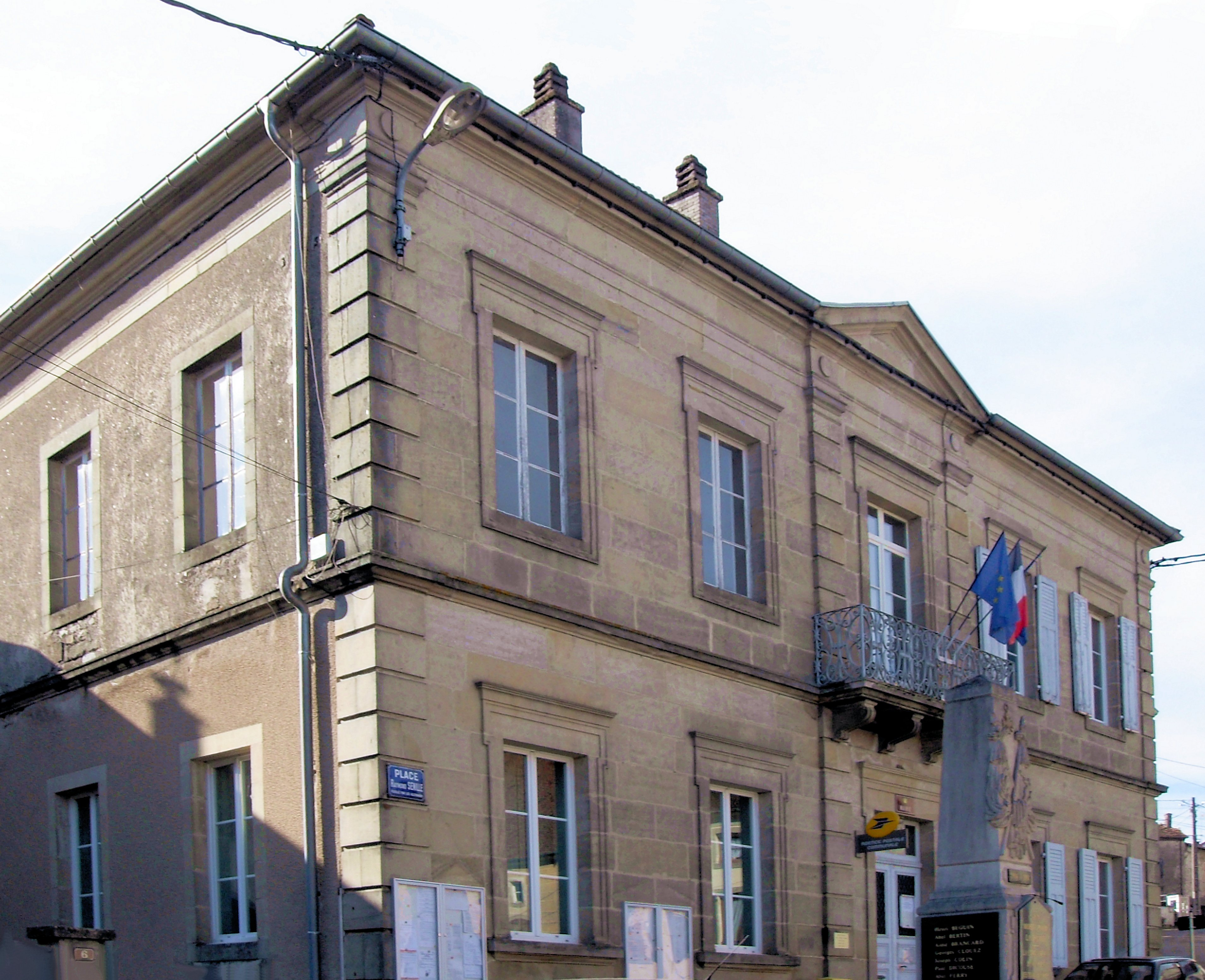
- The town hall in Jonvelle

- Coat of arms
- Location of Jonvelle
- Location within France Location within Bourgogne-Franche-Comté
- Coordinates: 47°56′20″N 5°55′16″E
- Country: France
- Region: Bourgogne-Franche-Comté
- Department: Haute-Saône
- Arrondissement: Vesoul
- Canton: Jussey

Government
  - Mayor (2024–2026): Gérald Barroy
- Area^{1}: 12.37 km^{2} (4.78 sq mi)
- Highest elevation: 353 m (1,158 ft)
- Lowest elevation: 226 m (741 ft)
- Population (2023): 100
  - Density: 8.1/km^{2} (21/sq mi)
- Time zone: UTC+01:00 (CET)
  - Summer (DST): UTC+02:00 (CEST)
- INSEE/Postal code: 70291 /70500
- ^{1} French Land Register data, which excludes lakes, ponds, glaciers > 1 km^{2} (0.386 sq mi or 247 acres) and river estuaries.

Jonvelle (French pronunciation: [ʒɔ̃vɛl]) is a commune in the Haute-Saône department in the region of Bourgogne-Franche-Comté in eastern France.

== See also ==
- Communes of the Haute-Saône department
- Histoire de Jonvelle.
