= Oigney =

- Commune
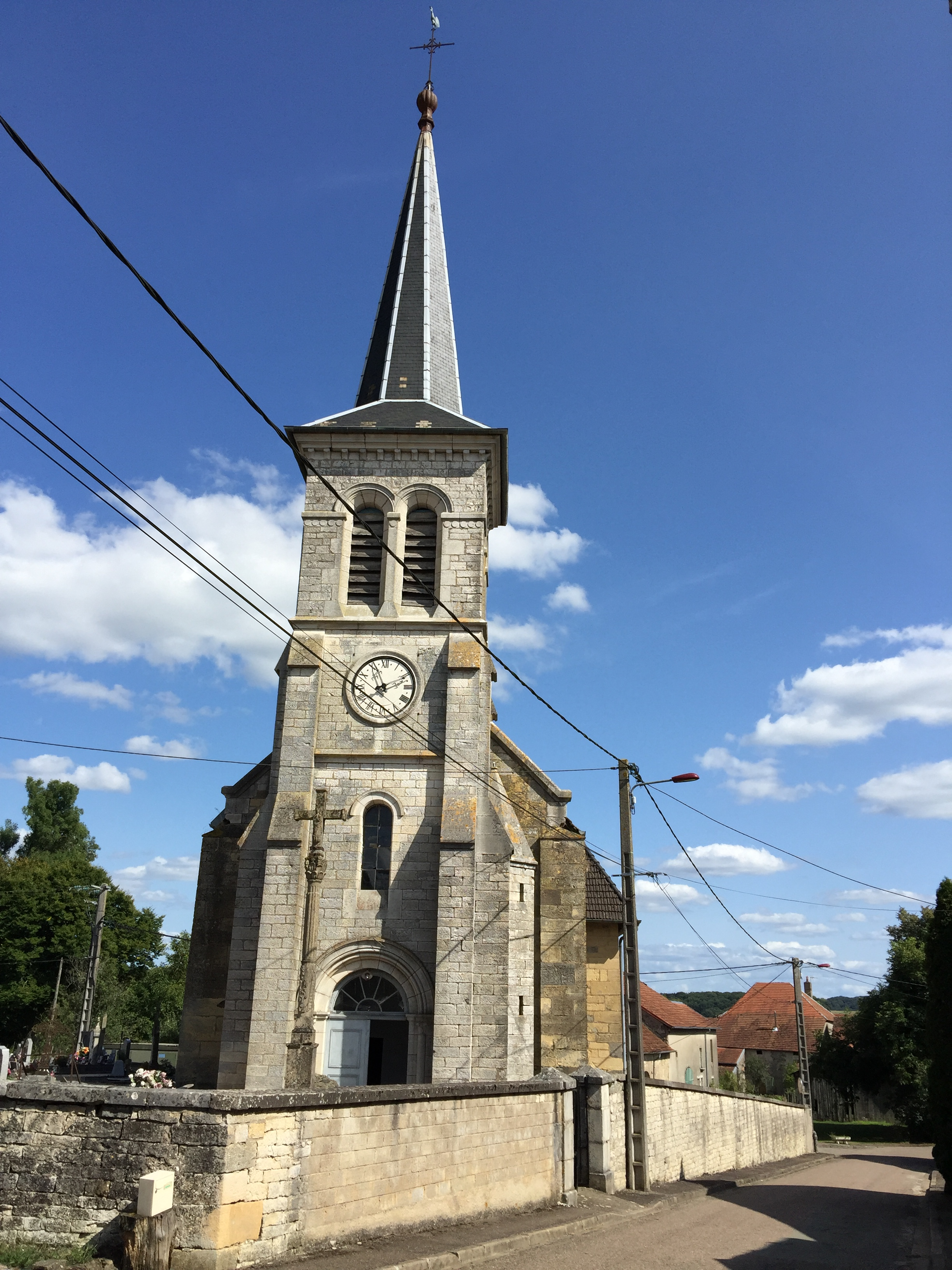
- The church in Oigney

- Coat of arms
- Location of Oigney
- Location within France Location within Bourgogne-Franche-Comté
- Coordinates: 47°45′44″N 5°51′19″E
- Country: France
- Region: Bourgogne-Franche-Comté
- Department: Haute-Saône
- Arrondissement: Vesoul
- Canton: Jussey

Government
  - Mayor (2023–2026): Jean-Michel Clerc
- Area^{1}: 7.97 km^{2} (3.08 sq mi)
- Highest elevation: 349 m (1,145 ft)
- Lowest elevation: 249 m (817 ft)
- Population (2023): 48
  - Density: 6.0/km^{2} (16/sq mi)
- Time zone: UTC+01:00 (CET)
  - Summer (DST): UTC+02:00 (CEST)
- INSEE/Postal code: 70392 /70120
- ^{1} French Land Register data, which excludes lakes, ponds, glaciers > 1 km^{2} (0.386 sq mi or 247 acres) and river estuaries.

Oigney is a commune in the Haute-Saône department in the region of Bourgogne-Franche-Comté in eastern France.

== See also ==
- Communes of the Haute-Saône department
