= Bourbévelle =

- Commune
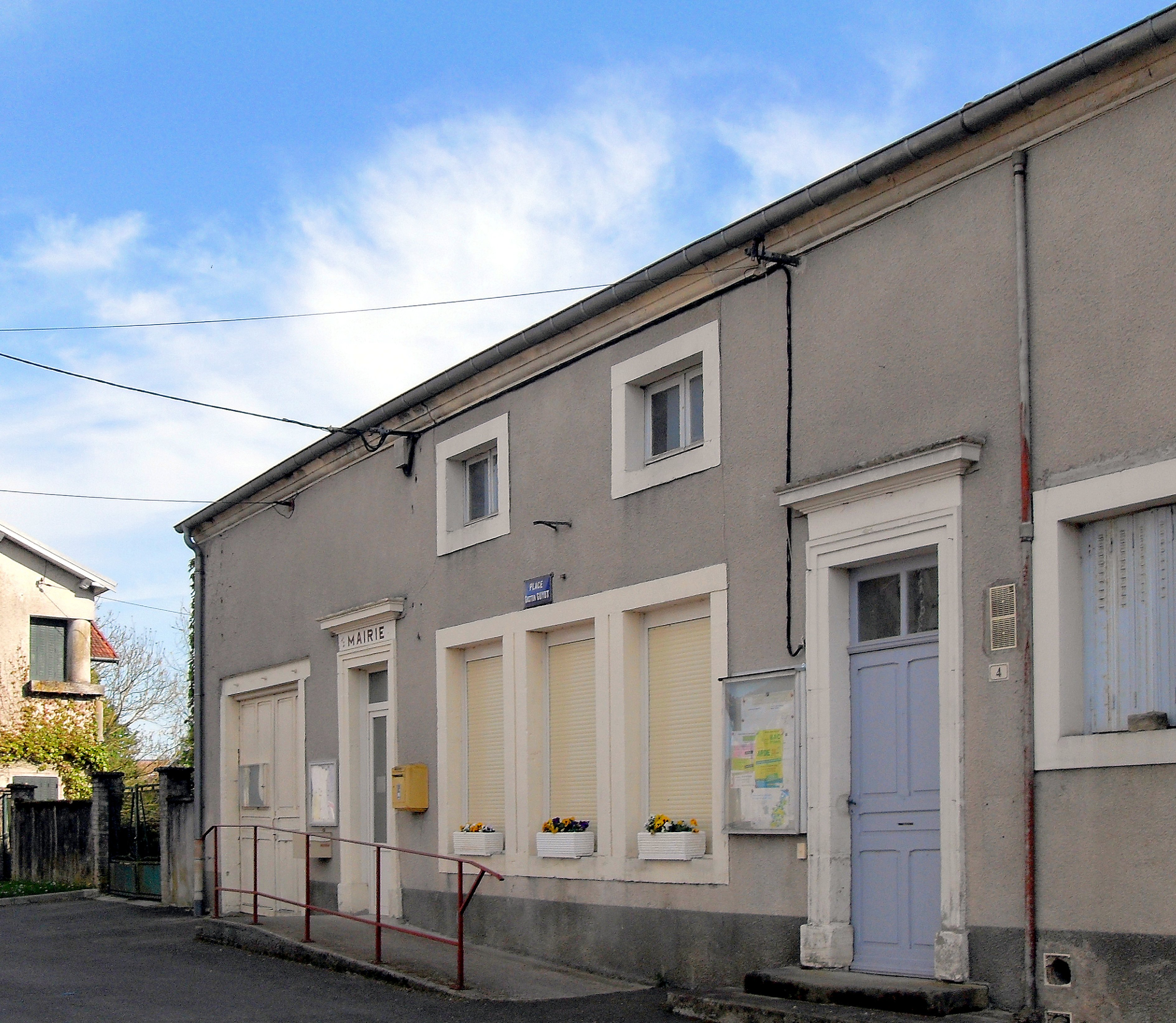
- The town hall in Bourbévelle
- Location of Bourbévelle
- Location within France Location within Bourgogne-Franche-Comté
- Coordinates: 47°55′28″N 5°56′26″E
- Country: France
- Region: Bourgogne-Franche-Comté
- Department: Haute-Saône
- Arrondissement: Vesoul
- Canton: Jussey

Government
  - Mayor (2020–2026): Christian Colotte
- Area^{1}: 56.37 km^{2} (21.76 sq mi)
- Highest elevation: 315 m (1,033 ft)
- Lowest elevation: 222 m (728 ft)
- Population (2023): 75
  - Density: 1.3/km^{2} (3.4/sq mi)
- Time zone: UTC+01:00 (CET)
  - Summer (DST): UTC+02:00 (CEST)
- INSEE/Postal code: 70086 /70500
- ^{1} French Land Register data, which excludes lakes, ponds, glaciers > 1 km^{2} (0.386 sq mi or 247 acres) and river estuaries.

Bourbévelle (French pronunciation: [buʁbevɛl]) is a commune in the Haute-Saône department in the region of Bourgogne-Franche-Comté in eastern France.

== See also ==
- Communes of the Haute-Saône department
