= Villars-le-Pautel =

- Commune
- Location of Villars-le-Pautel
- Location within France Location within Bourgogne-Franche-Comté
- Coordinates: 47°53′44″N 5°56′03″E
- Country: France
- Region: Bourgogne-Franche-Comté
- Department: Haute-Saône
- Arrondissement: Vesoul
- Canton: Jussey

Government
  - Mayor (2024–2026): Christian Jamey
- Area^{1}: 12.18 km^{2} (4.70 sq mi)
- Highest elevation: 342 m (1,122 ft)
- Lowest elevation: 220 m (720 ft)
- Population (2023): 175
  - Density: 14.4/km^{2} (37.2/sq mi)
- Time zone: UTC+01:00 (CET)
  - Summer (DST): UTC+02:00 (CEST)
- INSEE/Postal code: 70554 /70500
- ^{1} French Land Register data, which excludes lakes, ponds, glaciers > 1 km^{2} (0.386 sq mi or 247 acres) and river estuaries.

Villars-le-Pautel is a commune in the Haute-Saône department in the region of Bourgogne-Franche-Comté in eastern France.

== See also ==
- Communes of the Haute-Saône department
