= Melin =

- Commune
- Location of Melin
- Location within France Location within Bourgogne-Franche-Comté
- Coordinates: 47°44′26″N 5°49′39″E
- Country: France
- Region: Bourgogne-Franche-Comté
- Department: Haute-Saône
- Arrondissement: Vesoul
- Canton: Jussey
- Area^{1}: 5.73 km^{2} (2.21 sq mi)
- Highest elevation: 329 m (1,079 ft)
- Lowest elevation: 249 m (817 ft)
- Population (2023): 52
  - Density: 9.1/km^{2} (24/sq mi)
- Time zone: UTC+01:00 (CET)
  - Summer (DST): UTC+02:00 (CEST)
- INSEE/Postal code: 70337 /70120
- ^{1} French Land Register data, which excludes lakes, ponds, glaciers > 1 km^{2} (0.386 sq mi or 247 acres) and river estuaries.

Melin is a commune in the Haute-Saône department in the region of Bourgogne-Franche-Comté in eastern France.

== See also ==
- Communes of the Haute-Saône department
