= Combeaufontaine =

- Commune
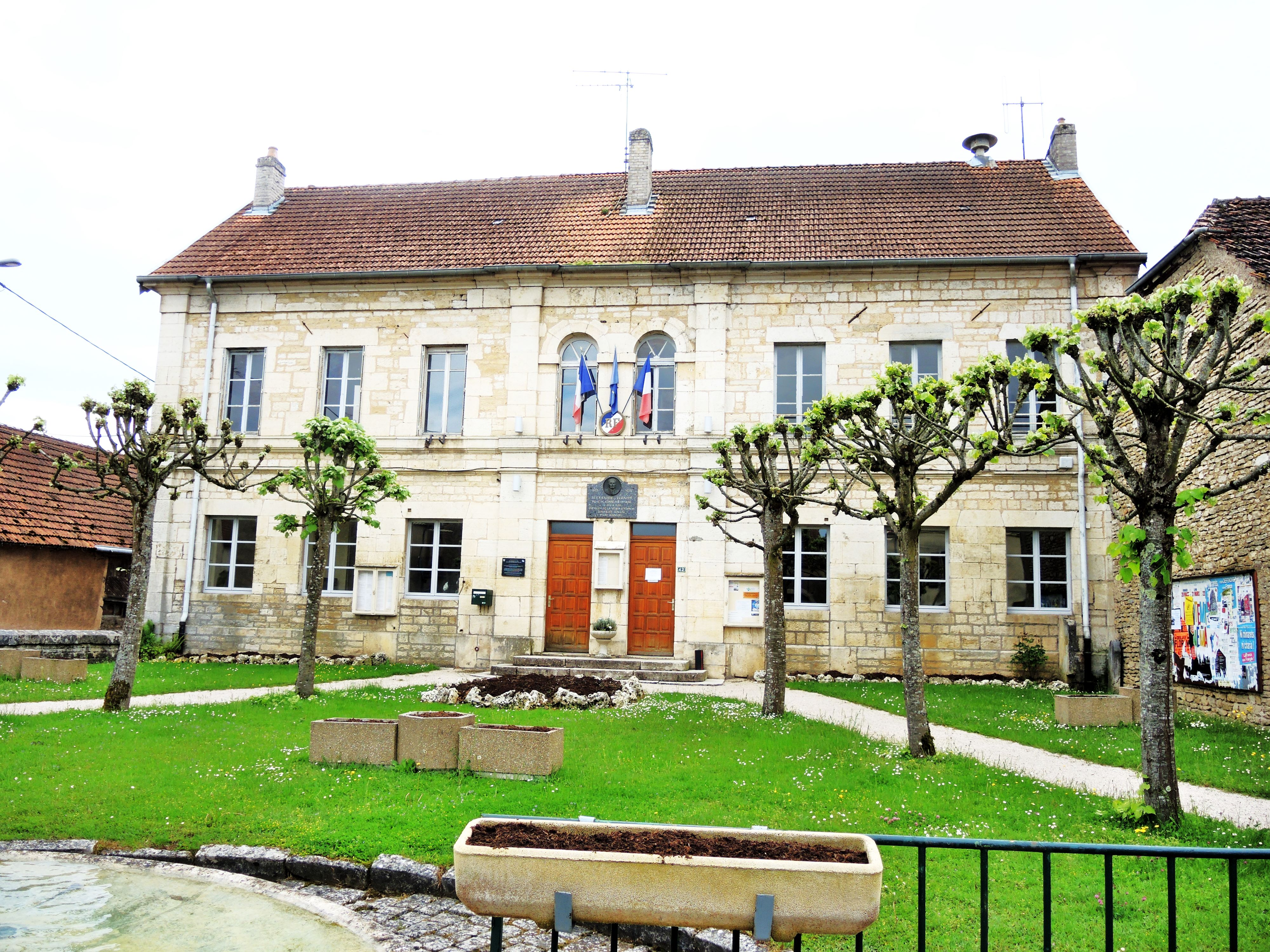
- The town hall in Combeaufontaine

- Coat of arms
- Location of Combeaufontaine
- Location within France Location within Bourgogne-Franche-Comté
- Coordinates: 47°42′39″N 5°53′31″E
- Country: France
- Region: Bourgogne-Franche-Comté
- Department: Haute-Saône
- Arrondissement: Vesoul
- Canton: Jussey

Government
  - Mayor (2020–2026): Romain Molliard
- Area^{1}: 12.19 km^{2} (4.71 sq mi)
- Highest elevation: 332 m (1,089 ft)
- Lowest elevation: 239 m (784 ft)
- Population (2023): 571
  - Density: 46.8/km^{2} (121/sq mi)
- Time zone: UTC+01:00 (CET)
  - Summer (DST): UTC+02:00 (CEST)
- INSEE/Postal code: 70165 /70120
- ^{1} French Land Register data, which excludes lakes, ponds, glaciers > 1 km^{2} (0.386 sq mi or 247 acres) and river estuaries.

Combeaufontaine (French pronunciation: [kɔ̃bofɔ̃tɛn]) is a commune in the Haute-Saône department in the region of Bourgogne-Franche-Comté in eastern France.

== See also ==
- Communes of the Haute-Saône department
