= Montcourt =

- Commune
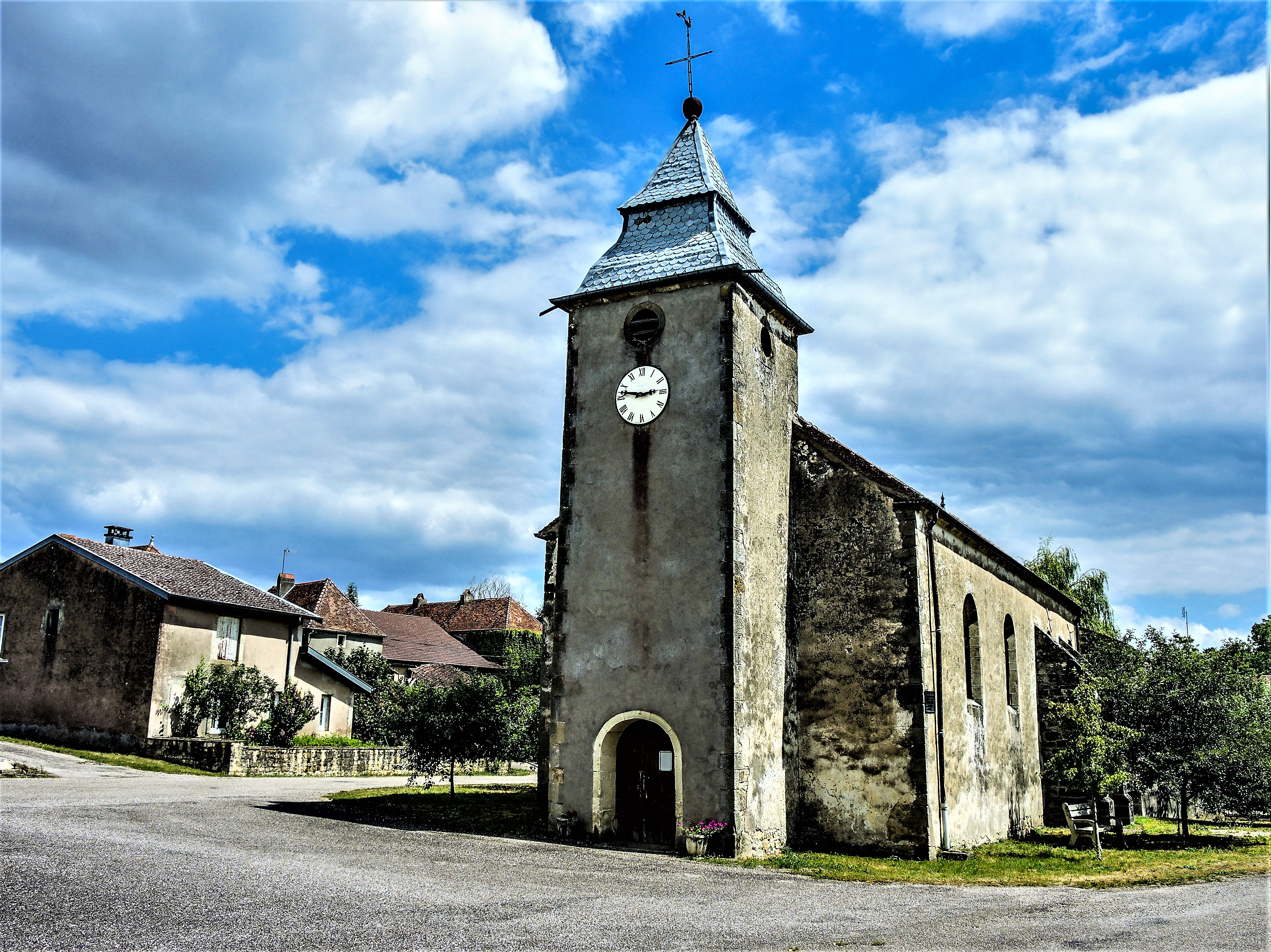
- The church in Montcourt
- Location of Montcourt
- Location within France Location within Bourgogne-Franche-Comté
- Coordinates: 47°55′51″N 5°57′29″E
- Country: France
- Region: Bourgogne-Franche-Comté
- Department: Haute-Saône
- Arrondissement: Vesoul
- Canton: Jussey

Government
  - Mayor (2020–2026): Marie-Claude Mougin
- Area^{1}: 4.92 km^{2} (1.90 sq mi)
- Highest elevation: 310 m (1,020 ft)
- Lowest elevation: 224 m (735 ft)
- Population (2023): 52
  - Density: 11/km^{2} (27/sq mi)
- Time zone: UTC+01:00 (CET)
  - Summer (DST): UTC+02:00 (CEST)
- INSEE/Postal code: 70359 /70500
- ^{1} French Land Register data, which excludes lakes, ponds, glaciers > 1 km^{2} (0.386 sq mi or 247 acres) and river estuaries.

Montcourt (French pronunciation: [mɔ̃kuʁ]) is a commune in the Haute-Saône department in the region of Bourgogne-Franche-Comté in eastern France.

== See also ==
- Communes of the Haute-Saône department
