= Charmes-Saint-Valbert =

- Commune
- Location of Charmes-Saint-Valbert
- Location within France Location within Bourgogne-Franche-Comté
- Coordinates: 47°43′46″N 5°42′34″E
- Country: France
- Region: Bourgogne-Franche-Comté
- Department: Haute-Saône
- Arrondissement: Vesoul
- Canton: Jussey

Government
  - Mayor (2020–2026): Patrick Carteret
- Area^{1}: 5.00 km^{2} (1.93 sq mi)
- Highest elevation: 380 m (1,250 ft)
- Lowest elevation: 255 m (837 ft)
- Population (2023): 32
  - Density: 6.4/km^{2} (17/sq mi)
- Time zone: UTC+01:00 (CET)
  - Summer (DST): UTC+02:00 (CEST)
- INSEE/Postal code: 70135 /70120
- ^{1} French Land Register data, which excludes lakes, ponds, glaciers > 1 km^{2} (0.386 sq mi or 247 acres) and river estuaries.

Charmes-Saint-Valbert (French pronunciation: [ʃaʁm sɛ̃ valbɛʁ]) is a commune in the Haute-Saône department in the region of Bourgogne-Franche-Comté in eastern France.

== See also ==
- Communes of the Haute-Saône department
