= Saint-Marcel, Haute-Saône =

Saint-Marcel
- Commune
- Location of Saint-Marcel
- Location within France Location within Bourgogne-Franche-Comté
- Coordinates: 47°49′36″N 5°49′31″E
- Country: France
- Region: Bourgogne-Franche-Comté
- Department: Haute-Saône
- Arrondissement: Vesoul
- Canton: Jussey

Government
  - Mayor (2020–2026): Patrick Simonin
- Area^{1}: 7.10 km^{2} (2.74 sq mi)
- Highest elevation: 317 m (1,040 ft)
- Lowest elevation: 239 m (784 ft)
- Population (2023): 90
  - Density: 13/km^{2} (33/sq mi)
- Time zone: UTC+01:00 (CET)
  - Summer (DST): UTC+02:00 (CEST)
- INSEE/Postal code: 70468 /70500
- ^{1} French Land Register data, which excludes lakes, ponds, glaciers > 1 km^{2} (0.386 sq mi or 247 acres) and river estuaries.

Saint-Marcel (French pronunciation: [sɛ̃ maʁsɛl]) is a commune in the Haute-Saône department in the region of Bourgogne-Franche-Comté in eastern France.

== See also ==
- Communes of the Haute-Saône department
