= Blondefontaine =

- Commune
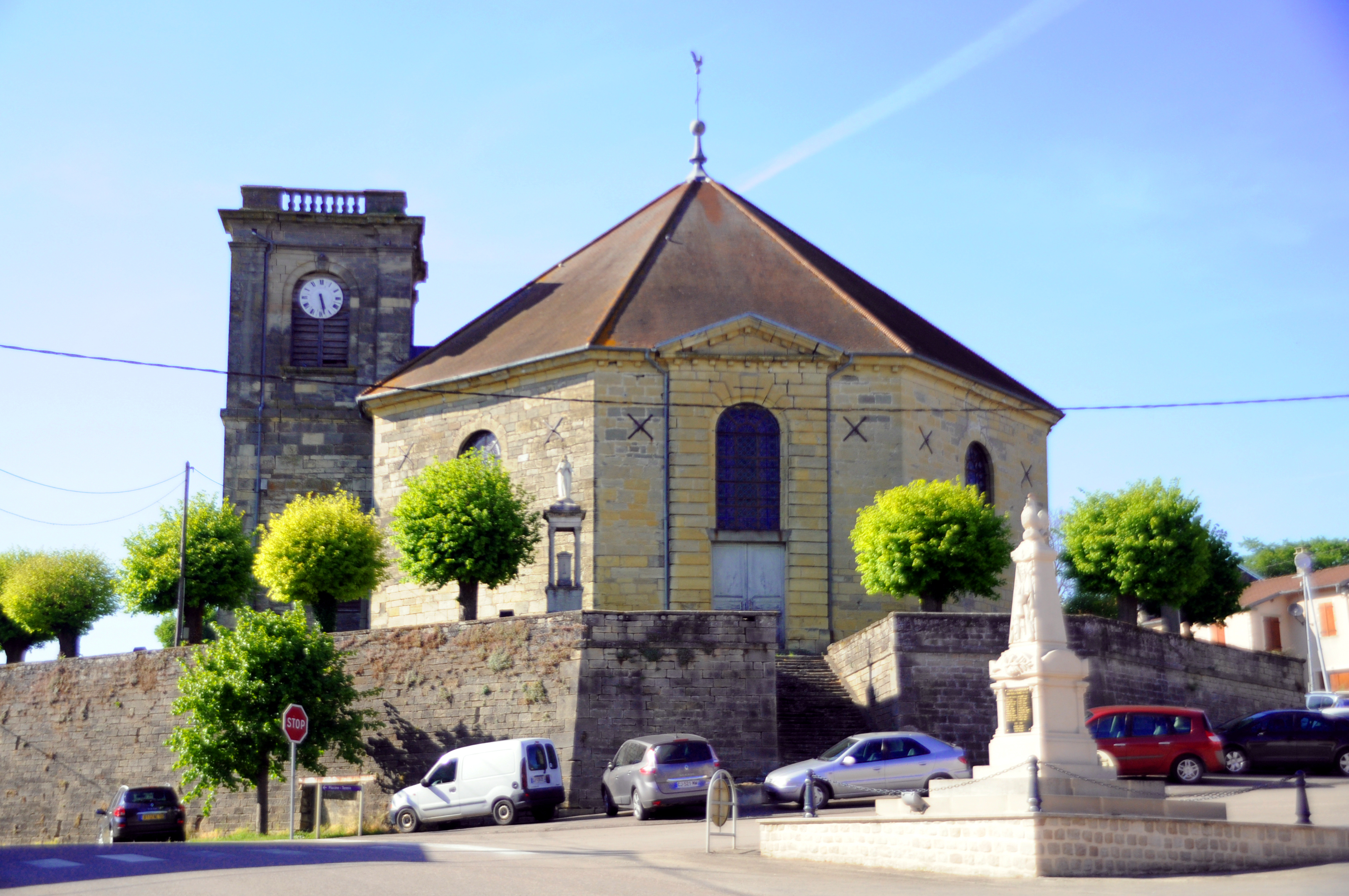
- The church in Blondefontaine
- Location of Blondefontaine
- Location within France Location within Bourgogne-Franche-Comté
- Coordinates: 47°52′41″N 5°52′10″E
- Country: France
- Region: Bourgogne-Franche-Comté
- Department: Haute-Saône
- Arrondissement: Vesoul
- Canton: Jussey

Government
  - Mayor (2020–2026): Jacky Favret
- Area^{1}: 13.40 km^{2} (5.17 sq mi)
- Highest elevation: 373 m (1,224 ft)
- Lowest elevation: 218 m (715 ft)
- Population (2023): 238
  - Density: 17.8/km^{2} (46.0/sq mi)
- Time zone: UTC+01:00 (CET)
  - Summer (DST): UTC+02:00 (CEST)
- INSEE/Postal code: 70074 /70500
- ^{1} French Land Register data, which excludes lakes, ponds, glaciers > 1 km^{2} (0.386 sq mi or 247 acres) and river estuaries.

Blondefontaine (French pronunciation: [blɔ̃dfɔ̃tɛn]) is a commune in the Haute-Saône department in the region of Bourgogne-Franche-Comté in eastern France.

== See also ==
- Communes of the Haute-Saône department
