= Vitrey-sur-Mance =

- Commune
- Location of Vitrey-sur-Mance
- Location within France Location within Bourgogne-Franche-Comté
- Coordinates: 47°48′54″N 5°45′43″E
- Country: France
- Region: Bourgogne-Franche-Comté
- Department: Haute-Saône
- Arrondissement: Vesoul
- Canton: Jussey

Government
  - Mayor (2020–2026): Frédéric Berger
- Area^{1}: 13.48 km^{2} (5.20 sq mi)
- Highest elevation: 349 m (1,145 ft)
- Lowest elevation: 223 m (732 ft)
- Population (2023): 287
  - Density: 21.3/km^{2} (55.1/sq mi)
- Time zone: UTC+01:00 (CET)
  - Summer (DST): UTC+02:00 (CEST)
- INSEE/Postal code: 70572 /70500
- ^{1} French Land Register data, which excludes lakes, ponds, glaciers > 1 km^{2} (0.386 sq mi or 247 acres) and river estuaries.

Vitrey-sur-Mance (French pronunciation: [vitʁɛ syʁ mɑ̃s], literally Vitrey on Mance) is a commune in the Haute-Saône department in the region of Bourgogne-Franche-Comté in eastern France.

== See also ==
- Communes of the Haute-Saône department
