= Augicourt =

- Commune
- Coat of arms
- Location of Augicourt
- Location within France Location within Bourgogne-Franche-Comté
- Coordinates: 47°46′29″N 5°53′55″E
- Country: France
- Region: Bourgogne-Franche-Comté
- Department: Haute-Saône
- Arrondissement: Vesoul
- Canton: Jussey
- Intercommunality: CC Hauts Val Saône

Government
  - Mayor (2020–2026): Alain Jutzi
- Area^{1}: 9.06 km^{2} (3.50 sq mi)
- Highest elevation: 309 m (1,014 ft)
- Lowest elevation: 223 m (732 ft)
- Population (2023): 175
  - Density: 19.3/km^{2} (50.0/sq mi)
- Time zone: UTC+01:00 (CET)
  - Summer (DST): UTC+02:00 (CEST)
- INSEE/Postal code: 70035 /70500
- ^{1} French Land Register data, which excludes lakes, ponds, glaciers > 1 km^{2} (0.386 sq mi or 247 acres) and river estuaries.

Augicourt (French pronunciation: [oʒikuʁ]) is a commune in the Haute-Saône department in the region of Bourgogne-Franche-Comté in eastern France.

== See also ==
- Communes of the Haute-Saône department
