= Preigney =

- Commune
- Coat of arms
- Location of Preigney
- Location within France Location within Bourgogne-Franche-Comté
- Coordinates: 47°45′49″N 5°46′35″E
- Country: France
- Region: Bourgogne-Franche-Comté
- Department: Haute-Saône
- Arrondissement: Vesoul
- Canton: Jussey

Government
  - Mayor (2020–2026): Jean-Claude Crochet
- Area^{1}: 12.18 km^{2} (4.70 sq mi)
- Highest elevation: 372 m (1,220 ft)
- Lowest elevation: 268 m (879 ft)
- Population (2023): 113
  - Density: 9.28/km^{2} (24.0/sq mi)
- Time zone: UTC+01:00 (CET)
  - Summer (DST): UTC+02:00 (CEST)
- INSEE/Postal code: 70423 /70120
- ^{1} French Land Register data, which excludes lakes, ponds, glaciers > 1 km^{2} (0.386 sq mi or 247 acres) and river estuaries.

Preigney (French pronunciation: [pʁɛɲɛ]) is a commune in the Haute-Saône department in the region of Bourgogne-Franche-Comté in eastern France.

== See also ==
- Communes of the Haute-Saône department
