= Rosières-sur-Mance =

- Commune
- Location of Rosières-sur-Mance
- Location within France Location within Bourgogne-Franche-Comté
- Coordinates: 47°50′15″N 5°47′49″E
- Country: France
- Region: Bourgogne-Franche-Comté
- Department: Haute-Saône
- Arrondissement: Vesoul
- Canton: Jussey

Government
  - Mayor (2020–2026): Christiane Massez
- Area^{1}: 5.22 km^{2} (2.02 sq mi)
- Highest elevation: 325 m (1,066 ft)
- Lowest elevation: 222 m (728 ft)
- Population (2023): 53
  - Density: 10/km^{2} (26/sq mi)
- Time zone: UTC+01:00 (CET)
  - Summer (DST): UTC+02:00 (CEST)
- INSEE/Postal code: 70454 /70500
- ^{1} French Land Register data, which excludes lakes, ponds, glaciers > 1 km^{2} (0.386 sq mi or 247 acres) and river estuaries.

Rosières-sur-Mance (French pronunciation: [ʁozjɛʁ syʁ mɑ̃s], literally Rosières on Mance) is a commune in the Haute-Saône department in the region of Bourgogne-Franche-Comté in eastern France.

== See also ==
- Communes of the Haute-Saône department
