= Bousseraucourt =

- Commune
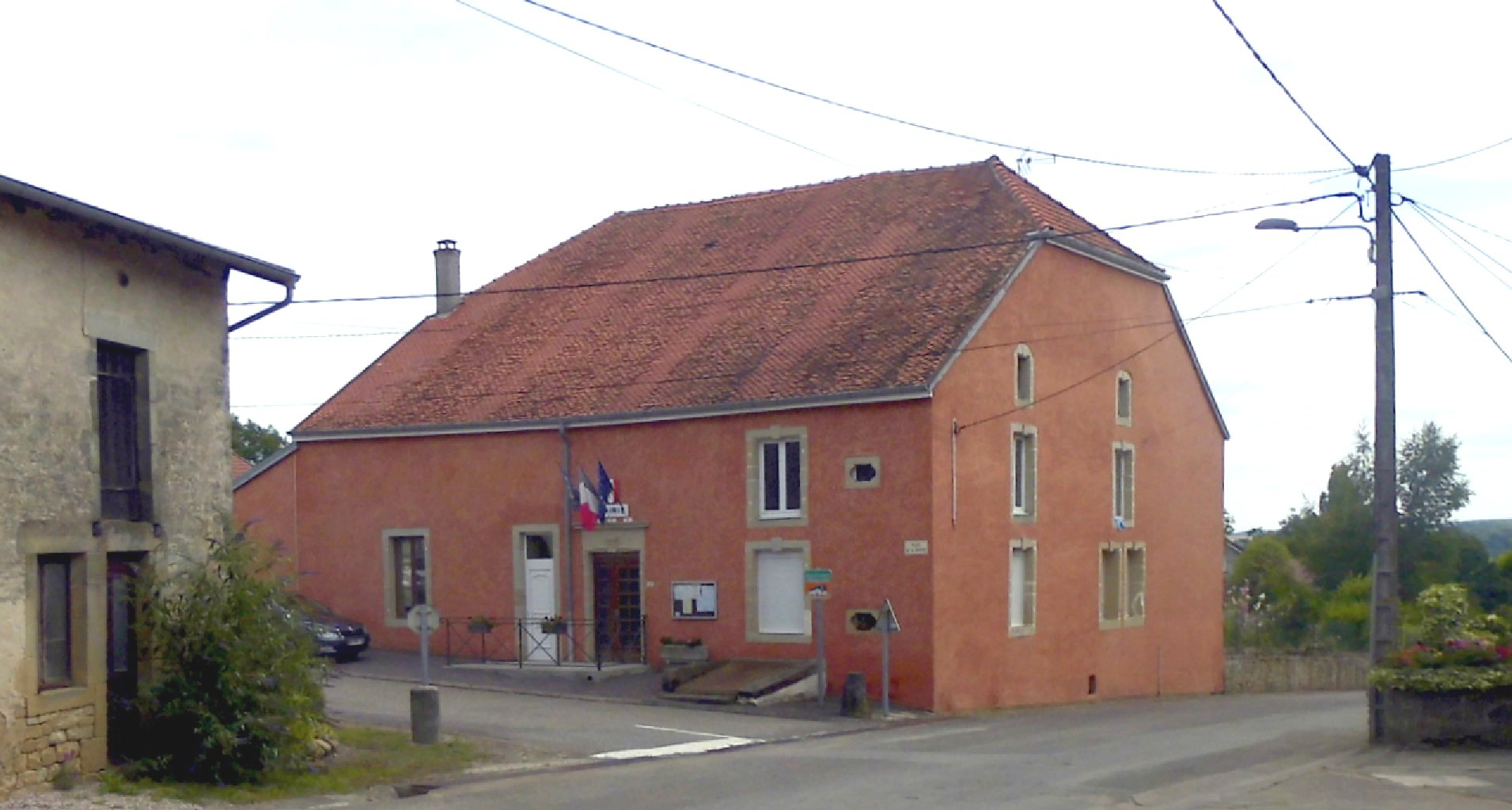
- The town hall in Bousseraucourt
- Location of Bousseraucourt
- Location within France Location within Bourgogne-Franche-Comté
- Coordinates: 47°57′42″N 5°55′48″E
- Country: France
- Region: Bourgogne-Franche-Comté
- Department: Haute-Saône
- Arrondissement: Vesoul
- Canton: Jussey

Government
  - Mayor (2020–2026): Noël Fenouillot
- Area^{1}: 7.58 km^{2} (2.93 sq mi)
- Highest elevation: 347 m (1,138 ft)
- Lowest elevation: 229 m (751 ft)
- Population (2023): 46
  - Density: 6.1/km^{2} (16/sq mi)
- Time zone: UTC+01:00 (CET)
  - Summer (DST): UTC+02:00 (CEST)
- INSEE/Postal code: 70091 /70500
- ^{1} French Land Register data, which excludes lakes, ponds, glaciers > 1 km^{2} (0.386 sq mi or 247 acres) and river estuaries.

Bousseraucourt (French pronunciation: [busʁokuʁ]) is a commune in the Haute-Saône department in the region of Bourgogne-Franche-Comté in eastern France.

== See also ==
- Communes of the Haute-Saône department
