= Raincourt =

- Commune
- Location of Raincourt
- Location within France Location within Bourgogne-Franche-Comté
- Coordinates: 47°51′39″N 5°53′11″E
- Country: France
- Region: Bourgogne-Franche-Comté
- Department: Haute-Saône
- Arrondissement: Vesoul
- Canton: Jussey

Government
  - Mayor (2020–2026): Cédric Martel
- Area^{1}: 8.28 km^{2} (3.20 sq mi)
- Highest elevation: 321 m (1,053 ft)
- Lowest elevation: 217 m (712 ft)
- Population (2023): 110
  - Density: 13/km^{2} (34/sq mi)
- Time zone: UTC+01:00 (CET)
  - Summer (DST): UTC+02:00 (CEST)
- INSEE/Postal code: 70436 /70500
- ^{1} French Land Register data, which excludes lakes, ponds, glaciers > 1 km^{2} (0.386 sq mi or 247 acres) and river estuaries.

Raincourt (French pronunciation: [ʁɛ̃kuʁ]) is a commune in the Haute-Saône department in the region of Bourgogne-Franche-Comté in eastern France.

== See also ==
- Communes of the Haute-Saône department
