= Malvillers =

- Commune
- Location of Malvillers
- Location within France Location within Bourgogne-Franche-Comté
- Coordinates: 47°43′56″N 5°47′15″E
- Country: France
- Region: Bourgogne-Franche-Comté
- Department: Haute-Saône
- Arrondissement: Vesoul
- Canton: Jussey
- Area^{1}: 7.09 km^{2} (2.74 sq mi)
- Highest elevation: 359 m (1,178 ft)
- Lowest elevation: 248 m (814 ft)
- Population (2023): 68
  - Density: 9.6/km^{2} (25/sq mi)
- Time zone: UTC+01:00 (CET)
  - Summer (DST): UTC+02:00 (CEST)
- INSEE/Postal code: 70329 /70120
- ^{1} French Land Register data, which excludes lakes, ponds, glaciers > 1 km^{2} (0.386 sq mi or 247 acres) and river estuaries.

Malvillers is a commune in the Haute-Saône department in the region of Bourgogne-Franche-Comté in eastern France.

== See also ==
- Communes of the Haute-Saône department
