= Ranzevelle =

- Commune
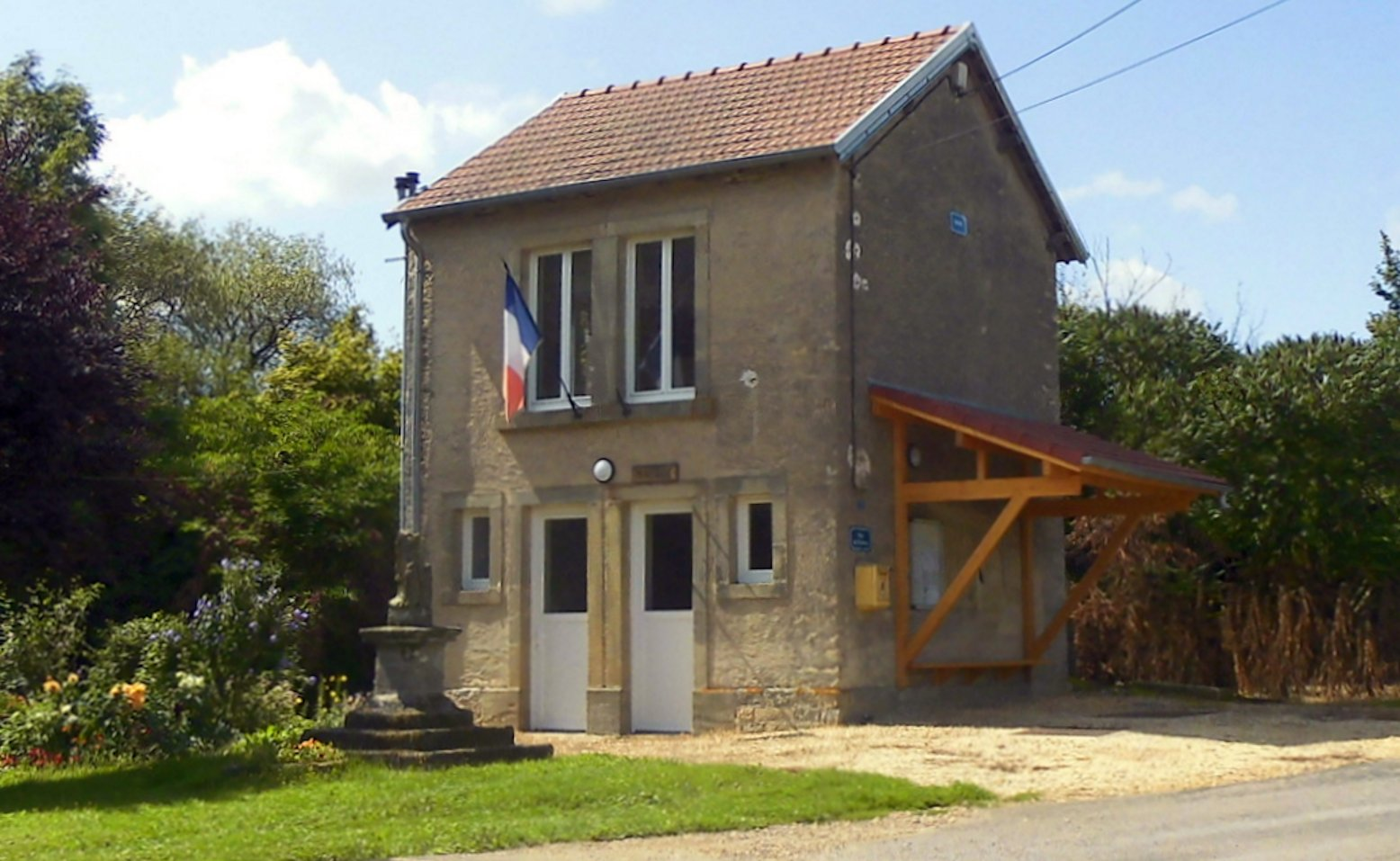
- The town hall in Ranzevelle
- Location of Ranzevelle
- Location within France Location within Bourgogne-Franche-Comté
- Coordinates: 47°54′28″N 5°59′10″E
- Country: France
- Region: Bourgogne-Franche-Comté
- Department: Haute-Saône
- Arrondissement: Vesoul
- Canton: Jussey

Government
  - Mayor (2020–2026): Éric Ruaux
- Area^{1}: 2.38 km^{2} (0.92 sq mi)
- Highest elevation: 257 m (843 ft)
- Lowest elevation: 217 m (712 ft)
- Population (2023): 16
  - Density: 6.7/km^{2} (17/sq mi)
- Time zone: UTC+01:00 (CET)
  - Summer (DST): UTC+02:00 (CEST)
- INSEE/Postal code: 70437 /70500
- ^{1} French Land Register data, which excludes lakes, ponds, glaciers > 1 km^{2} (0.386 sq mi or 247 acres) and river estuaries.

Ranzevelle (French pronunciation: [ʁɑ̃zvɛl]) is a commune in the Haute-Saône department in the region of Bourgogne-Franche-Comté in eastern France.

== See also ==
- Communes of the Haute-Saône department
