= Arbecey =

- Commune
- Coat of arms
- Location of Arbecey
- Location within France Location within Bourgogne-Franche-Comté
- Coordinates: 47°44′26″N 5°55′45″E
- Country: France
- Region: Bourgogne-Franche-Comté
- Department: Haute-Saône
- Arrondissement: Vesoul
- Canton: Jussey

Government
  - Mayor (2020–2026): Régis Lecorney
- Area^{1}: 16.71 km^{2} (6.45 sq mi)
- Highest elevation: 361 m (1,184 ft)
- Lowest elevation: 232 m (761 ft)
- Population (2023): 228
  - Density: 13.6/km^{2} (35.3/sq mi)
- Time zone: UTC+01:00 (CET)
  - Summer (DST): UTC+02:00 (CEST)
- INSEE/Postal code: 70025 /70160
- ^{1} French Land Register data, which excludes lakes, ponds, glaciers > 1 km^{2} (0.386 sq mi or 247 acres) and river estuaries.

Arbecey (French pronunciation: [aʁbəsɛ]) is a commune in the Haute-Saône department in the region of Bourgogne-Franche-Comté in eastern France.

== See also ==
- Communes of the Haute-Saône department
