= Montdoré =

- Commune
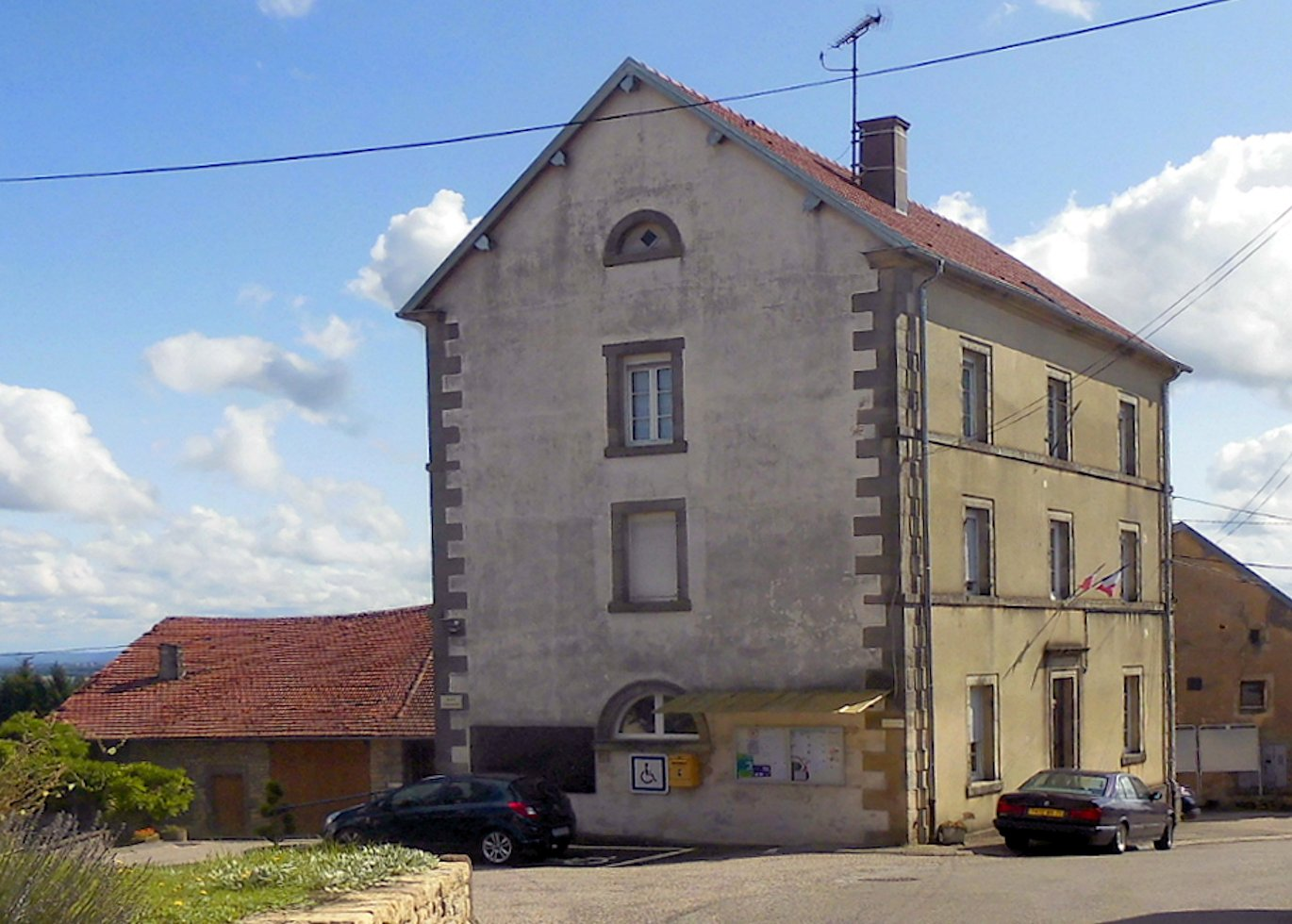
- The town hall in Montdoré
- Location of Montdoré
- Location within France Location within Bourgogne-Franche-Comté
- Coordinates: 47°55′19″N 6°04′52″E
- Country: France
- Region: Bourgogne-Franche-Comté
- Department: Haute-Saône
- Arrondissement: Lure
- Canton: Jussey

Government
  - Mayor (2020–2026): Claude Fournier
- Area^{1}: 7.59 km^{2} (2.93 sq mi)
- Highest elevation: 392 m (1,286 ft)
- Lowest elevation: 229 m (751 ft)
- Population (2023): 69
  - Density: 9.1/km^{2} (24/sq mi)
- Time zone: UTC+01:00 (CET)
  - Summer (DST): UTC+02:00 (CEST)
- INSEE/Postal code: 70360 /70210
- ^{1} French Land Register data, which excludes lakes, ponds, glaciers > 1 km^{2} (0.386 sq mi or 247 acres) and river estuaries.

Montdoré (French pronunciation: [mɔ̃dɔʁe]) is a commune in the Haute-Saône department in the region of Bourgogne-Franche-Comté in eastern France.

== See also ==
- Communes of the Haute-Saône department
