= Chargey-lès-Port =

- Commune
- Coat of arms
- Location of Chargey-lès-Port
- Location within France Location within Bourgogne-Franche-Comté
- Coordinates: 47°44′18″N 5°59′59″E
- Country: France
- Region: Bourgogne-Franche-Comté
- Department: Haute-Saône
- Arrondissement: Vesoul
- Canton: Jussey
- Area^{1}: 13.05 km^{2} (5.04 sq mi)
- Highest elevation: 376 m (1,234 ft)
- Lowest elevation: 212 m (696 ft)
- Population (2023): 238
  - Density: 18.2/km^{2} (47.2/sq mi)
- Time zone: UTC+01:00 (CET)
  - Summer (DST): UTC+02:00 (CEST)
- INSEE/Postal code: 70133 /70170
- ^{1} French Land Register data, which excludes lakes, ponds, glaciers > 1 km^{2} (0.386 sq mi or 247 acres) and river estuaries.

Chargey-lès-Port is a commune in the Haute-Saône department in the region of Bourgogne-Franche-Comté in eastern France.

== See also ==
- Communes of the Haute-Saône department
