= Purgerot =

- Commune
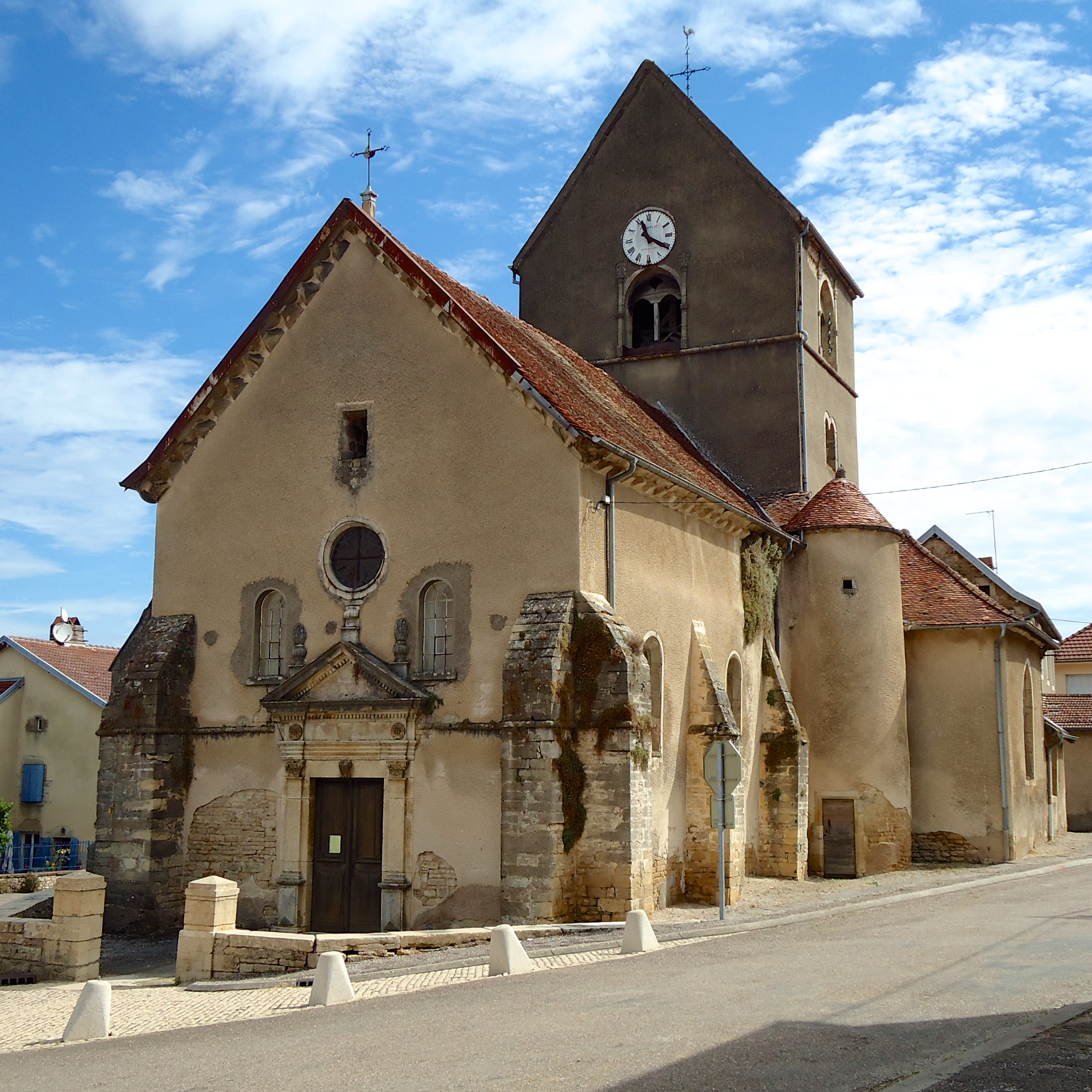
- The church in Purgerot

- Coat of arms
- Location of Purgerot
- Location within France Location within Bourgogne-Franche-Comté
- Coordinates: 47°45′01″N 5°59′56″E
- Country: France
- Region: Bourgogne-Franche-Comté
- Department: Haute-Saône
- Arrondissement: Vesoul
- Canton: Jussey

Government
  - Mayor (2020–2026): Bruno Confland
- Area^{1}: 14.11 km^{2} (5.45 sq mi)
- Highest elevation: 363 m (1,191 ft)
- Lowest elevation: 209 m (686 ft)
- Population (2023): 327
  - Density: 23.2/km^{2} (60.0/sq mi)
- Time zone: UTC+01:00 (CET)
  - Summer (DST): UTC+02:00 (CEST)
- INSEE/Postal code: 70427 /70160
- ^{1} French Land Register data, which excludes lakes, ponds, glaciers > 1 km^{2} (0.386 sq mi or 247 acres) and river estuaries.

Purgerot (French pronunciation: [pyʁʒəʁo]) is a commune in the Haute-Saône department in the region of Bourgogne-Franche-Comté in eastern France.

== See also ==
- Communes of the Haute-Saône department
