= Lavigney =

- Commune
- Coat of arms
- Location of Lavigney
- Location within France Location within Bourgogne-Franche-Comté
- Coordinates: 47°42′50″N 5°48′36″E
- Country: France
- Region: Bourgogne-Franche-Comté
- Department: Haute-Saône
- Arrondissement: Vesoul
- Canton: Jussey

Government
  - Mayor (2020–2026): Brigitte Delhier
- Area^{1}: 9.93 km^{2} (3.83 sq mi)
- Highest elevation: 307 m (1,007 ft)
- Lowest elevation: 233 m (764 ft)
- Population (2023): 129
  - Density: 13.0/km^{2} (33.6/sq mi)
- Time zone: UTC+01:00 (CET)
  - Summer (DST): UTC+02:00 (CEST)
- INSEE/Postal code: 70298 /70120
- ^{1} French Land Register data, which excludes lakes, ponds, glaciers > 1 km^{2} (0.386 sq mi or 247 acres) and river estuaries.

Lavigney (French pronunciation: [laviɲɛ]) is a commune in the Haute-Saône department in the region of Bourgogne-Franche-Comté in eastern France.

== See also ==
- Communes of the Haute-Saône department
