= Cintrey =

- Commune
- Location of Cintrey
- Location within France Location within Bourgogne-Franche-Comté
- Coordinates: 47°45′05″N 5°45′23″E
- Country: France
- Region: Bourgogne-Franche-Comté
- Department: Haute-Saône
- Arrondissement: Vesoul
- Canton: Jussey

Government
  - Mayor (2020–2026): Florence Springaux
- Area^{1}: 6.08 km^{2} (2.35 sq mi)
- Highest elevation: 358 m (1,175 ft)
- Lowest elevation: 263 m (863 ft)
- Population (2023): 96
  - Density: 16/km^{2} (41/sq mi)
- Time zone: UTC+01:00 (CET)
  - Summer (DST): UTC+02:00 (CEST)
- INSEE/Postal code: 70153 /70120
- ^{1} French Land Register data, which excludes lakes, ponds, glaciers > 1 km^{2} (0.386 sq mi or 247 acres) and river estuaries.

Cintrey (French pronunciation: [sɛ̃tʁɛ]) is a commune in the Haute-Saône department in the region of Bourgogne-Franche-Comté in eastern France.

== See also ==
- Communes of the Haute-Saône department
