= Abancourt =

Abancourt may refer to:

- Abancourt, Nord, a commune of the Nord département in France
- Abancourt, Oise, a commune of the Oise département in France

== See also ==
- Aboncourt (disambiguation)
