= Betoncourt-sur-Mance =

- Commune
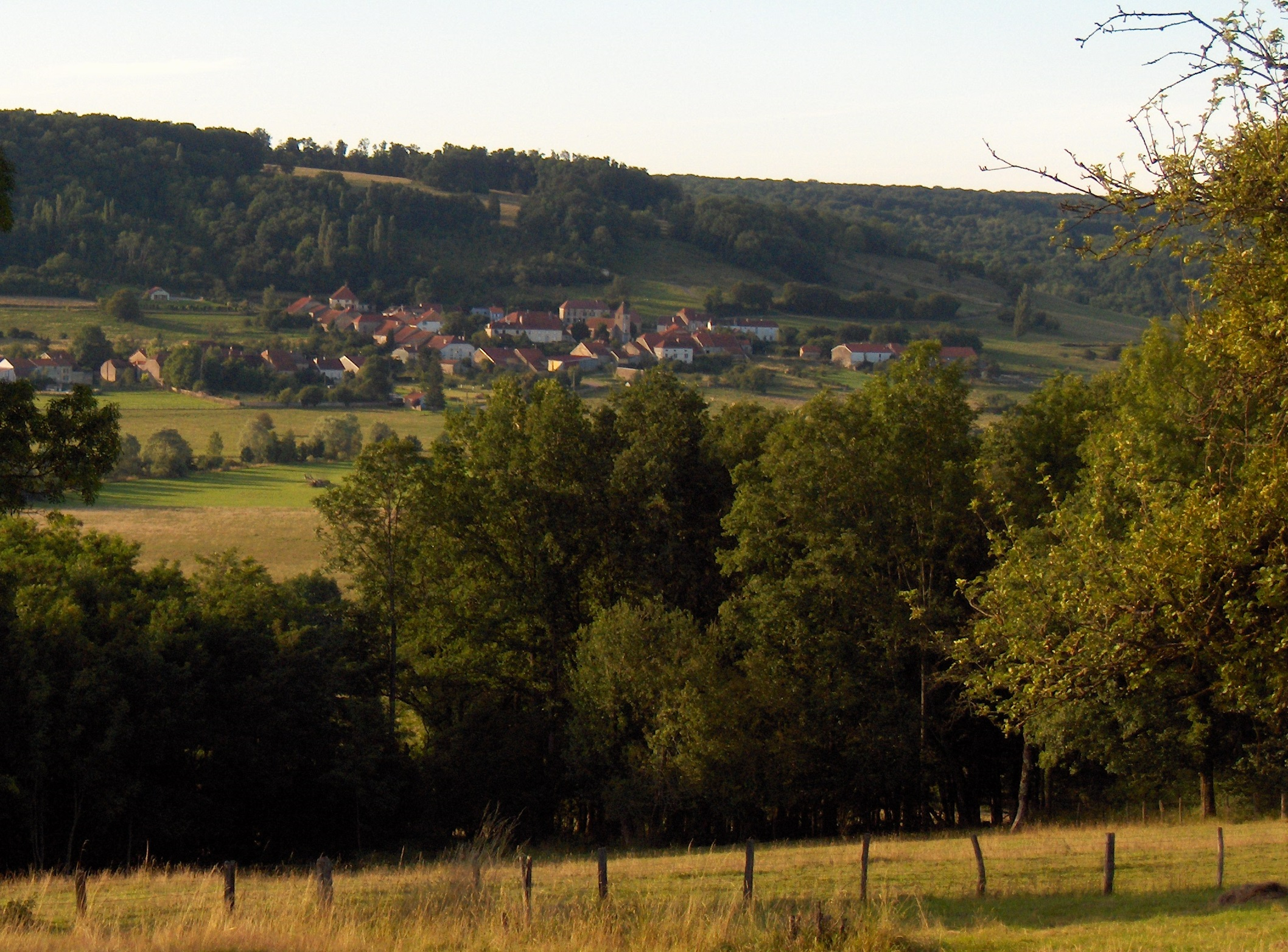
- A general view of Betoncourt-sur-Mance
- Location of Betoncourt-sur-Mance
- Location within France Location within Bourgogne-Franche-Comté
- Coordinates: 47°49′53″N 5°45′21″E
- Country: France
- Region: Bourgogne-Franche-Comté
- Department: Haute-Saône
- Arrondissement: Vesoul
- Canton: Jussey
- Area^{1}: 3.72 km^{2} (1.44 sq mi)
- Highest elevation: 367 m (1,204 ft)
- Lowest elevation: 223 m (732 ft)
- Population (2023): 25
  - Density: 6.7/km^{2} (17/sq mi)
- Time zone: UTC+01:00 (CET)
  - Summer (DST): UTC+02:00 (CEST)
- INSEE/Postal code: 70070 /70500
- ^{1} French Land Register data, which excludes lakes, ponds, glaciers > 1 km^{2} (0.386 sq mi or 247 acres) and river estuaries.

Betoncourt-sur-Mance is a commune in the Haute-Saône department in the region of Bourgogne-Franche-Comté in eastern France.

== See also ==
- Communes of the Haute-Saône department
