= Cornot =

- Commune
- Location of Cornot
- Location within France Location within Bourgogne-Franche-Comté
- Coordinates: 47°41′39″N 5°50′05″E
- Country: France
- Region: Bourgogne-Franche-Comté
- Department: Haute-Saône
- Arrondissement: Vesoul
- Canton: Jussey

Government
  - Mayor (2020–2026): Dominique Castelletti
- Area^{1}: 11.19 km^{2} (4.32 sq mi)
- Highest elevation: 293 m (961 ft)
- Lowest elevation: 222 m (728 ft)
- Population (2023): 132
  - Density: 11.8/km^{2} (30.6/sq mi)
- Time zone: UTC+01:00 (CET)
  - Summer (DST): UTC+02:00 (CEST)
- INSEE/Postal code: 70175 /70120
- ^{1} French Land Register data, which excludes lakes, ponds, glaciers > 1 km^{2} (0.386 sq mi or 247 acres) and river estuaries.

Cornot (French pronunciation: [kɔʁno]) is a commune in the Haute-Saône department in the region of Bourgogne-Franche-Comté in eastern France.

== See also ==
- Communes of the Haute-Saône department
