= Betaucourt =

- Commune
- Location of Betaucourt
- Location within France Location within Bourgogne-Franche-Comté
- Coordinates: 47°51′53″N 5°55′12″E
- Country: France
- Region: Bourgogne-Franche-Comté
- Department: Haute-Saône
- Arrondissement: Vesoul
- Canton: Jussey
- Area^{1}: 7.17 km^{2} (2.77 sq mi)
- Highest elevation: 283 m (928 ft)
- Lowest elevation: 212 m (696 ft)
- Population (2023): 181
  - Density: 25.2/km^{2} (65.4/sq mi)
- Time zone: UTC+01:00 (CET)
  - Summer (DST): UTC+02:00 (CEST)
- INSEE/Postal code: 70066 /70500
- ^{1} French Land Register data, which excludes lakes, ponds, glaciers > 1 km^{2} (0.386 sq mi or 247 acres) and river estuaries.

Betaucourt is a commune in the Haute-Saône department in the region of Bourgogne-Franche-Comté in eastern France.

== See also ==
- Communes of the Haute-Saône department
