= Barges, Haute-Saône =

Barges
- Commune
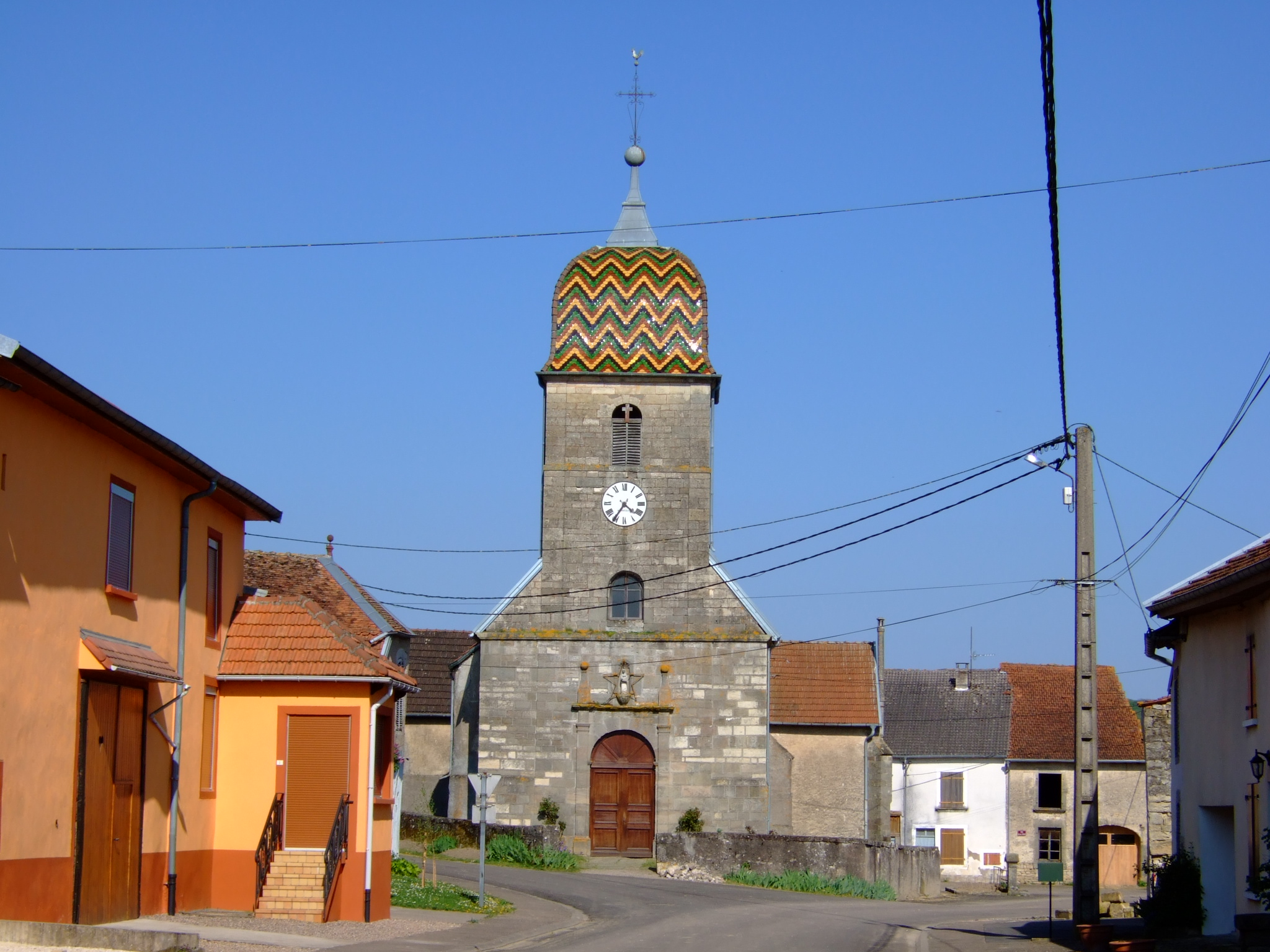
- The church in Barges

- Coat of arms
- Location of Barges
- Location within France Location within Bourgogne-Franche-Comté
- Coordinates: 47°51′48″N 5°50′52″E
- Country: France
- Region: Bourgogne-Franche-Comté
- Department: Haute-Saône
- Arrondissement: Vesoul
- Canton: Jussey

Government
  - Mayor (2020–2026): Laurent Bertrand
- Area^{1}: 7.91 km^{2} (3.05 sq mi)
- Highest elevation: 290 m (950 ft)
- Lowest elevation: 217 m (712 ft)
- Population (2023): 68
  - Density: 8.6/km^{2} (22/sq mi)
- Time zone: UTC+01:00 (CET)
  - Summer (DST): UTC+02:00 (CEST)
- INSEE/Postal code: 70049 /70500
- ^{1} French Land Register data, which excludes lakes, ponds, glaciers > 1 km^{2} (0.386 sq mi or 247 acres) and river estuaries.

Barges (French pronunciation: [baʁʒ]) is a commune in the Haute-Saône department in the region of Bourgogne-Franche-Comté, in eastern France.

== See also ==
- Communes of the Haute-Saône department
