= La Rochelle, Haute-Saône =

La Rochelle
- Commune
- Location of La Rochelle
- Location within France Location within Bourgogne-Franche-Comté
- Coordinates: 47°44′50″N 5°43′59″E
- Country: France
- Region: Bourgogne-Franche-Comté
- Department: Haute-Saône
- Arrondissement: Vesoul
- Canton: Jussey

Government
  - Mayor (2020–2026): Alexandre Multon
- Area^{1}: 4.23 km^{2} (1.63 sq mi)
- Highest elevation: 371 m (1,217 ft)
- Lowest elevation: 288 m (945 ft)
- Population (2023): 40
  - Density: 9.5/km^{2} (24/sq mi)
- Time zone: UTC+01:00 (CET)
  - Summer (DST): UTC+02:00 (CEST)
- INSEE/Postal code: 70450 /70120
- ^{1} French Land Register data, which excludes lakes, ponds, glaciers > 1 km^{2} (0.386 sq mi or 247 acres) and river estuaries.

La Rochelle (French pronunciation: [la ʁɔʃɛl]) is a commune in the Haute-Saône department in the region of Bourgogne-Franche-Comté in eastern France.

== See also ==
- Communes of the Haute-Saône department
