= Semmadon =

- Commune
- Coat of arms
- Location of Semmadon
- Location within France Location within Bourgogne-Franche-Comté
- Coordinates: 47°44′24″N 5°52′18″E
- Country: France
- Region: Bourgogne-Franche-Comté
- Department: Haute-Saône
- Arrondissement: Vesoul
- Canton: Jussey
- Area^{1}: 10.82 km^{2} (4.18 sq mi)
- Highest elevation: 316 m (1,037 ft)
- Lowest elevation: 245 m (804 ft)
- Population (2023): 107
  - Density: 9.89/km^{2} (25.6/sq mi)
- Time zone: UTC+01:00 (CET)
  - Summer (DST): UTC+02:00 (CEST)
- INSEE/Postal code: 70486 /70120
- ^{1} French Land Register data, which excludes lakes, ponds, glaciers > 1 km^{2} (0.386 sq mi or 247 acres) and river estuaries.

Semmadon is a commune in the Haute-Saône department in the region of Bourgogne-Franche-Comté in eastern France.

== See also ==
- Communes of the Haute-Saône department
