= La Neuvelle-lès-Scey =

- Commune
- Location of La Neuvelle-lès-Scey
- Location within France Location within Bourgogne-Franche-Comté
- Coordinates: 47°41′46″N 5°56′02″E
- Country: France
- Region: Bourgogne-Franche-Comté
- Department: Haute-Saône
- Arrondissement: Vesoul
- Canton: Jussey

Government
  - Mayor (2020–2026): Vincent Achard
- Area^{1}: 6.46 km^{2} (2.49 sq mi)
- Highest elevation: 345 m (1,132 ft)
- Lowest elevation: 247 m (810 ft)
- Population (2023): 171
  - Density: 26.5/km^{2} (68.6/sq mi)
- Time zone: UTC+01:00 (CET)
  - Summer (DST): UTC+02:00 (CEST)
- INSEE/Postal code: 70386 /70360
- ^{1} French Land Register data, which excludes lakes, ponds, glaciers > 1 km^{2} (0.386 sq mi or 247 acres) and river estuaries.

La Neuvelle-lès-Scey (French pronunciation: [la nøvɛl lɛ sɛ], literally La Neuvelle near Scey) is a commune in the Haute-Saône department in the region of Bourgogne-Franche-Comté in eastern France.

== See also ==
- Communes of the Haute-Saône department
