= Chauvirey-le-Vieil =

- Commune
- Location of Chauvirey-le-Vieil
- Location within France Location within Bourgogne-Franche-Comté
- Coordinates: 47°47′11″N 5°45′23″E
- Country: France
- Region: Bourgogne-Franche-Comté
- Department: Haute-Saône
- Arrondissement: Vesoul
- Canton: Jussey
- Area^{1}: 3.37 km^{2} (1.30 sq mi)
- Highest elevation: 341 m (1,119 ft)
- Lowest elevation: 242 m (794 ft)
- Population (2023): 24
  - Density: 7.1/km^{2} (18/sq mi)
- Time zone: UTC+01:00 (CET)
  - Summer (DST): UTC+02:00 (CEST)
- INSEE/Postal code: 70144 /70500
- ^{1} French Land Register data, which excludes lakes, ponds, glaciers > 1 km^{2} (0.386 sq mi or 247 acres) and river estuaries.

Chauvirey-le-Vieil is a commune in the Haute-Saône department in the region of Bourgogne-Franche-Comté in eastern France.

== See also ==
- Communes of the Haute-Saône department
