= Jussey =

- Commune
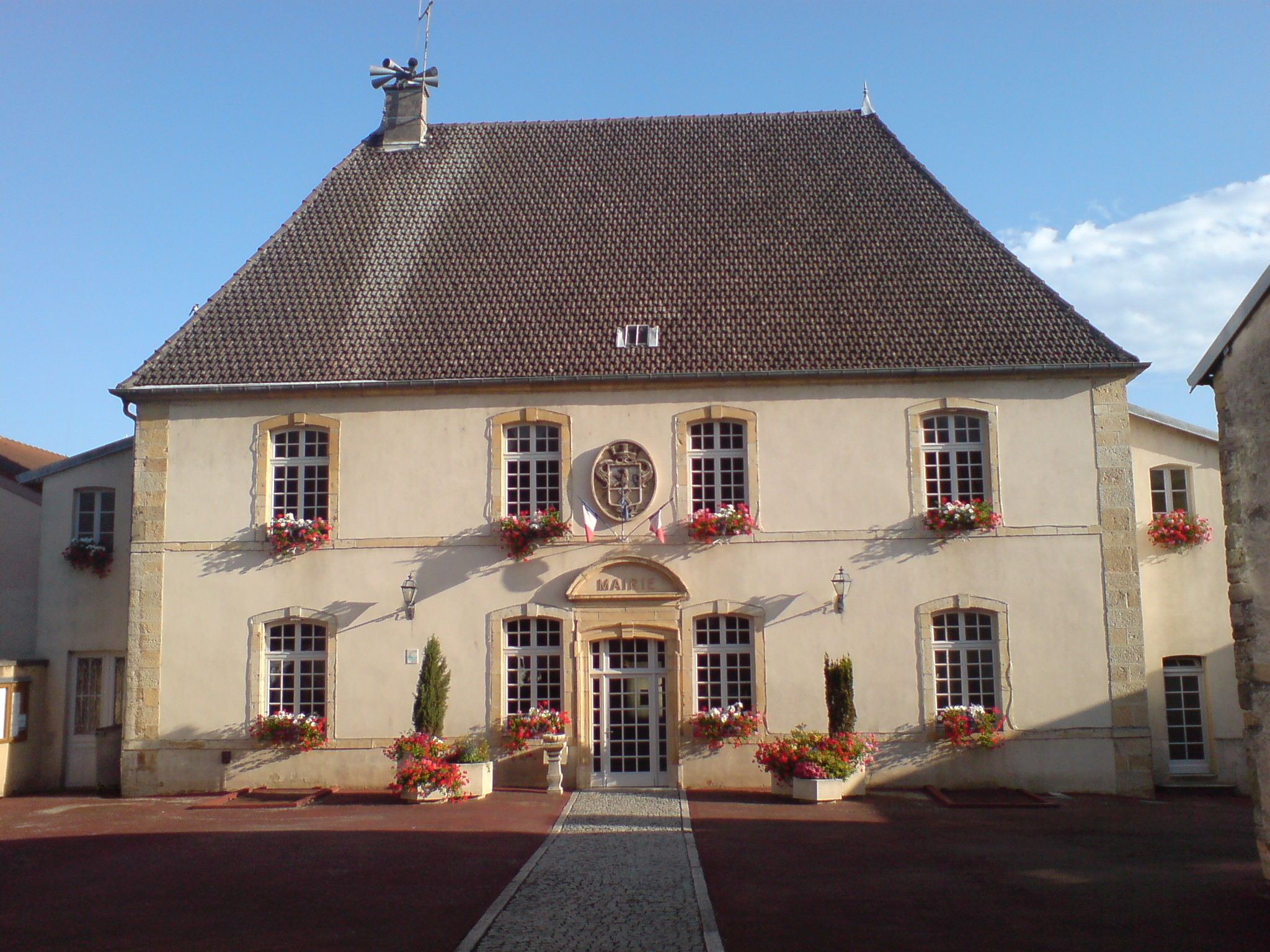
- The town hall in Jussey

- Coat of arms
- Location of Jussey
- Location within France Location within Bourgogne-Franche-Comté
- Coordinates: 47°49′35″N 5°54′05″E
- Country: France
- Region: Bourgogne-Franche-Comté
- Department: Haute-Saône
- Arrondissement: Vesoul
- Canton: Jussey

Government
  - Mayor (2020–2026): Nathalie Chevilley
- Area^{1}: 33.55 km^{2} (12.95 sq mi)
- Highest elevation: 363 m (1,191 ft)
- Lowest elevation: 212 m (696 ft)
- Population (2023): 1,558
  - Density: 46.44/km^{2} (120.3/sq mi)
- Time zone: UTC+01:00 (CET)
  - Summer (DST): UTC+02:00 (CEST)
- INSEE/Postal code: 70292 /70500
- ^{1} French Land Register data, which excludes lakes, ponds, glaciers > 1 km^{2} (0.386 sq mi or 247 acres) and river estuaries.

Jussey (French pronunciation: [ʒysɛ]) is a commune in the Haute-Saône department in the region of Bourgogne-Franche-Comté in eastern France. In 1973 it absorbed the former commune Noroy-lès-Jussey.

== See also ==
- Communes of the Haute-Saône department
