= Aisey-et-Richecourt =

- Commune
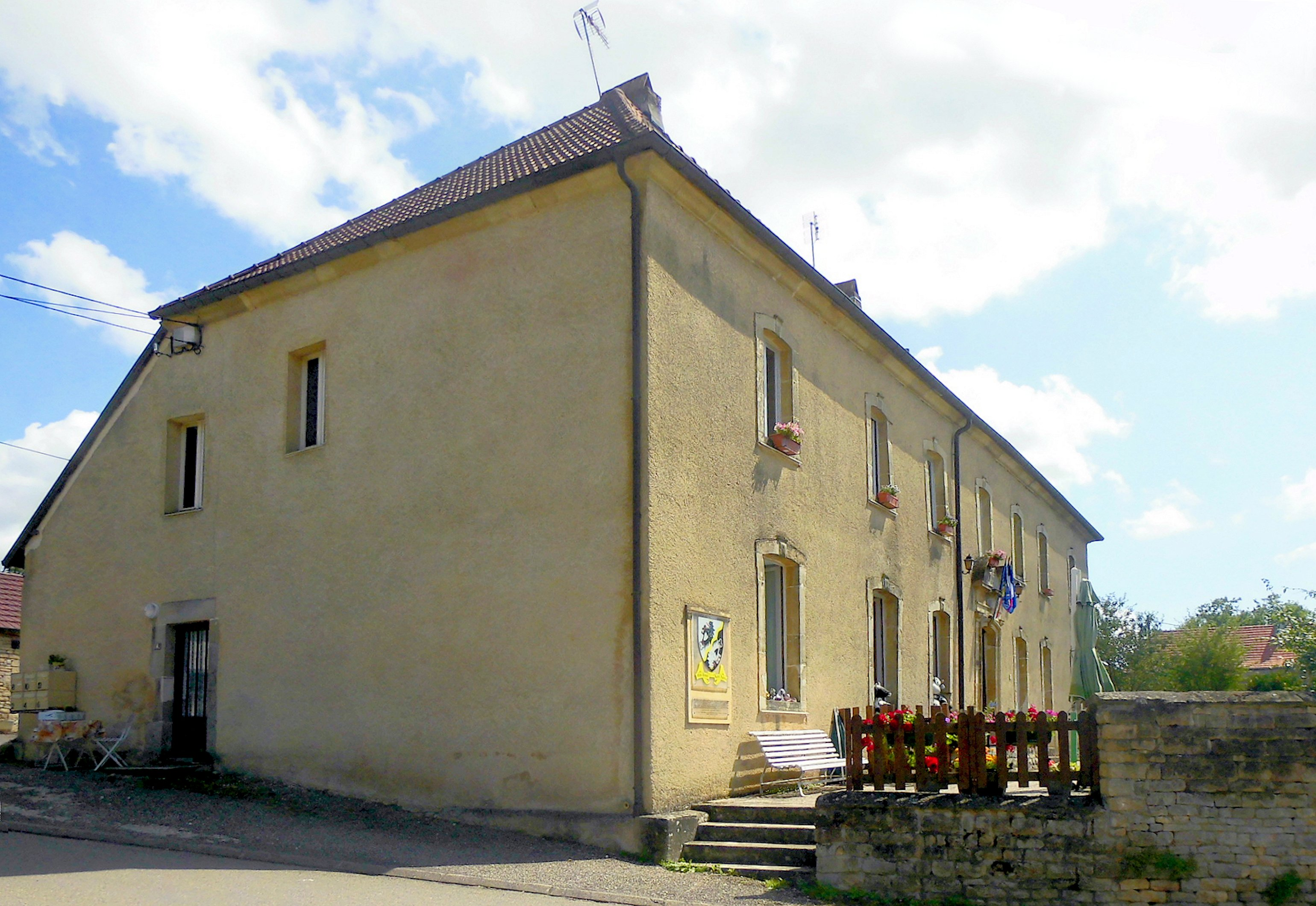
- The town hall in Aisey-et-Richecourt

- Coat of arms
- Location of Aisey-et-Richecourt
- Location within France Location within Bourgogne-Franche-Comté
- Coordinates: 47°53′25″N 5°57′18″E
- Country: France
- Region: Bourgogne-Franche-Comté
- Department: Haute-Saône
- Arrondissement: Vesoul
- Canton: Jussey
- Intercommunality: Hauts du Val de Saône

Government
  - Mayor (2020–2026): Guy Mercier
- Area^{1}: 7.80 km^{2} (3.01 sq mi)
- Highest elevation: 317 m (1,040 ft)
- Lowest elevation: 216 m (709 ft)
- Population (2023): 100
  - Density: 13/km^{2} (33/sq mi)
- Time zone: UTC+01:00 (CET)
  - Summer (DST): UTC+02:00 (CEST)
- INSEE/Postal code: 70009 /70500
- ^{1} French Land Register data, which excludes lakes, ponds, glaciers > 1 km^{2} (0.386 sq mi or 247 acres) and river estuaries.

Aisey-et-Richecourt (French pronunciation: [ɛzɛ e ʁiʃkuʁ]) is a commune in the Haute-Saône department in the region of Bourgogne-Franche-Comté in eastern France.

== Population ==
Historical population
Year	Pop.	±% p.a.
1968	124	—
1975	114	−1.19%
1982	104	−1.30%
1990	125	+2.33%
1999	141	+1.35%
2007	111	−2.95%
2012	100	−2.07%
2017	107	+1.36%
2023	100	−1.12%
Source: INSEE

== See also ==
- Communes of the Haute-Saône department
