= Canton of Jussey =

Canton of France

Coordinates: 47.83°N 5.90°E

The canton of Jussey is an administrative division of the Haute-Saône department, northeastern France. Its borders were modified at the French canton reorganisation which came into effect in March 2015. Its seat is in Jussey.

It consists of the following communes:

1. Aboncourt-Gesincourt
2. Aisey-et-Richecourt
3. Alaincourt
4. Ambiévillers
5. Arbecey
6. Augicourt
7. Barges
8. La Basse-Vaivre
9. Betaucourt
10. Betoncourt-sur-Mance
11. Blondefontaine
12. Bougey
13. Bourbévelle
14. Bourguignon-lès-Morey
15. Bousseraucourt
16. Cemboing
17. Cendrecourt
18. Chargey-lès-Port
19. Charmes-Saint-Valbert
20. Chauvirey-le-Châtel
21. Chauvirey-le-Vieil
22. Cintrey
23. Combeaufontaine
24. Confracourt
25. Cornot
26. Corre
27. Demangevelle
28. Fouchécourt
29. Gevigney-et-Mercey
30. Gourgeon
31. Hurecourt
32. Jonvelle
33. Jussey
34. Lambrey
35. Lavigney
36. Magny-lès-Jussey
37. Malvillers
38. Melin
39. Molay
40. Montcourt
41. Montdoré
42. Montigny-lès-Cherlieu
43. La Neuvelle-lès-Scey
44. Oigney
45. Ormoy
46. Ouge
47. Passavant-la-Rochère
48. Pont-du-Bois
49. Preigney
50. Purgerot
51. La Quarte
52. Raincourt
53. Ranzevelle
54. La Roche-Morey
55. La Rochelle
56. Rosières-sur-Mance
57. Saint-Marcel
58. Selles
59. Semmadon
60. Tartécourt
61. Vauvillers
62. Vernois-sur-Mance
63. Villars-le-Pautel
64. Vitrey-sur-Mance
65. Vougécourt
