= La Roche-Morey =

- Commune
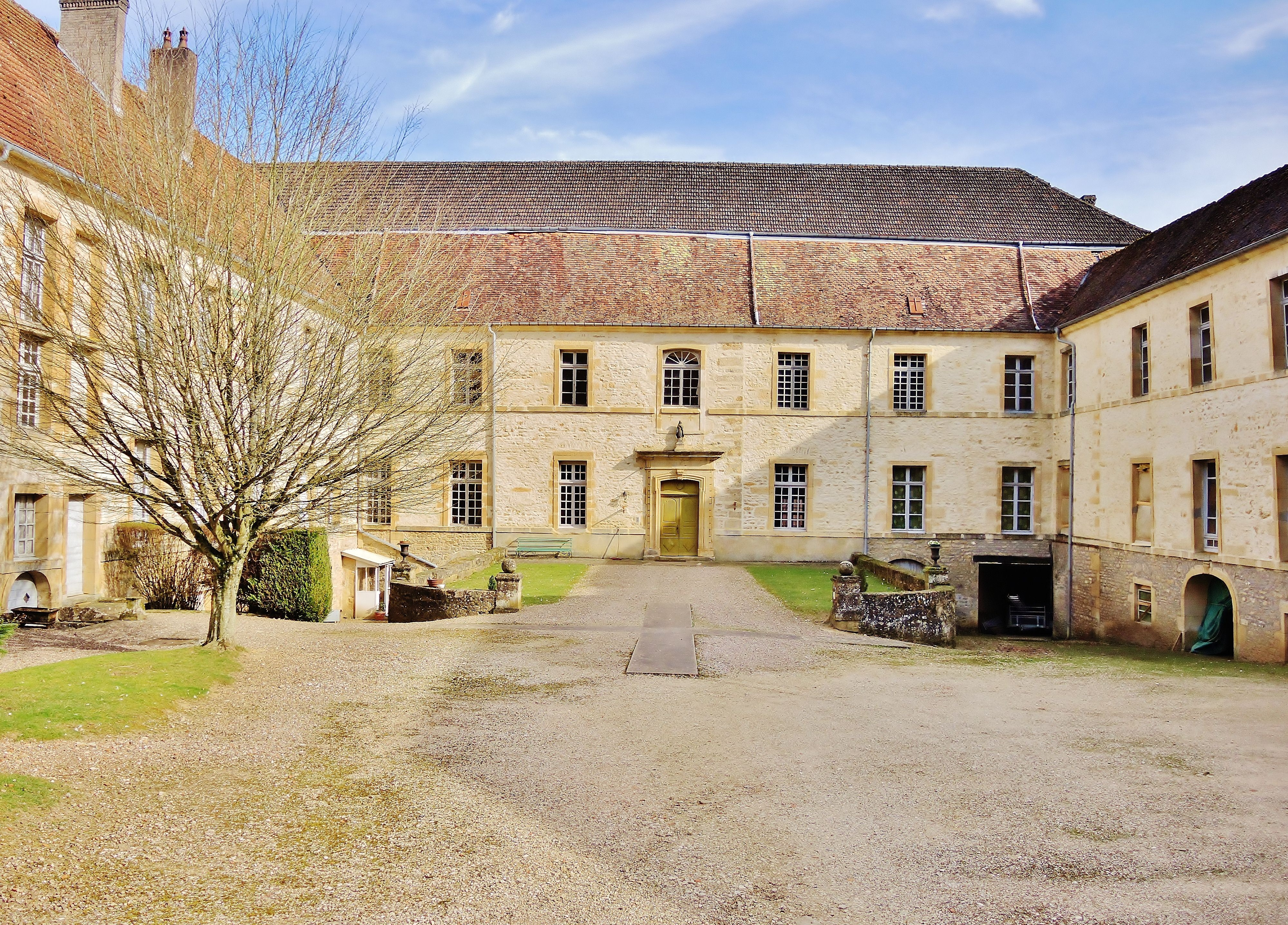
- The old monastery in La Roche-Morey

- Coat of arms
- Location of La Roche-Morey
- Location within France Location within Bourgogne-Franche-Comté
- Coordinates: 47°42′36″N 5°44′31″E
- Country: France
- Region: Bourgogne-Franche-Comté
- Department: Haute-Saône
- Arrondissement: Vesoul
- Canton: Jussey

Government
  - Mayor (2020–2026): Thierry Tupinier
- Area^{1}: 29.39 km^{2} (11.35 sq mi)
- Highest elevation: 447 m (1,467 ft)
- Lowest elevation: 234 m (768 ft)
- Population (2023): 297
  - Density: 10.1/km^{2} (26.2/sq mi)
- Time zone: UTC+01:00 (CET)
  - Summer (DST): UTC+02:00 (CEST)
- INSEE/Postal code: 70373 /70120
- ^{1} French Land Register data, which excludes lakes, ponds, glaciers > 1 km^{2} (0.386 sq mi or 247 acres) and river estuaries.

La Roche-Morey (French pronunciation: [la ʁɔʃ mɔʁɛ]) is a commune in the Haute-Saône department in the region of Bourgogne-Franche-Comté in eastern France. It was created in 1973 by the merger of four former communes: Morey, Betoncourt-les-Ménétriers, Saint-Julien and Suaucourt.

== See also ==
- Communes of the Haute-Saône department
