= Fouchécourt, Haute-Saône =

Fouchécourt
- Commune
- Coat of arms
- Location of Fouchécourt
- Location within France Location within Bourgogne-Franche-Comté
- Coordinates: 47°47′27″N 5°59′45″E
- Country: France
- Region: Bourgogne-Franche-Comté
- Department: Haute-Saône
- Arrondissement: Vesoul
- Canton: Jussey
- Area^{1}: 4.47 km^{2} (1.73 sq mi)
- Highest elevation: 281 m (922 ft)
- Lowest elevation: 211 m (692 ft)
- Population (2023): 120
  - Density: 27/km^{2} (70/sq mi)
- Time zone: UTC+01:00 (CET)
  - Summer (DST): UTC+02:00 (CEST)
- INSEE/Postal code: 70244 /70160
- ^{1} French Land Register data, which excludes lakes, ponds, glaciers > 1 km^{2} (0.386 sq mi or 247 acres) and river estuaries.

Fouchécourt (French pronunciation: [fuʃekuʁ]) is a commune in the Haute-Saône department in the region of Bourgogne-Franche-Comté in eastern France.

== See also ==
- Communes of the Haute-Saône department
