= Aboncourt-Gesincourt =

- Commune
- Location of Aboncourt-Gesincourt
- Location within France Location within Bourgogne-Franche-Comté
- Coordinates: 47°46′21″N 5°58′26″E
- Country: France
- Region: Bourgogne-Franche-Comté
- Department: Haute-Saône
- Arrondissement: Vesoul
- Canton: Jussey
- Intercommunality: Hauts du Val de Saône

Government
  - Mayor (2020–2026): Sophie Larue-Bolis
- Area^{1}: 10.68 km^{2} (4.12 sq mi)
- Highest elevation: 315 m (1,033 ft)
- Lowest elevation: 215 m (705 ft)
- Population (2023): 216
  - Density: 20.2/km^{2} (52.4/sq mi)
- Demonym(s): Aboncourtois, Aboncourtoises
- Time zone: UTC+01:00 (CET)
  - Summer (DST): UTC+02:00 (CEST)
- INSEE/Postal code: 70002 /70500
- ^{1} French Land Register data, which excludes lakes, ponds, glaciers > 1 km^{2} (0.386 sq mi or 247 acres) and river estuaries.

Aboncourt-Gesincourt is a commune in the Haute-Saône department in the region of Bourgogne-Franche-Comté in eastern France.

== Population ==
The population data given in the table and graph below for 1962 and earlier refer to the former commune of Aboncourt. Aboncourt-Gesincourt was established in 1964 by the merger of the former communes Aboncourt and Gesincourt.

Historical population

Year	Pop.	±% p.a.
1793	285	—
1821	262	−0.30%
1846	295	+0.48%
1872	279	−0.21%
1901	226	−0.72%
1926	184	−0.82%
1946	171	−0.37%
1962	137	−1.38%
1968	296	+13.70%

Year	Pop.	±% p.a.
1975	313	+0.80%
1982	240	−3.72%
1990	215	−1.37%
1999	204	−0.58%
2007	253	+2.73%
2012	220	−2.76%
2017	214	−0.55%
2023	216	+0.16%

Source: EHESS (1793–1999) and INSEE

== See also ==
- Communes of the Haute-Saône department
