= Malans =

Malans is the name of the following municipalities:

- Malans, Doubs, a commune in the Doubs department in France
- Malans, Haute-Saône, a commune in the Haute-Saône department in France
- Malans, Switzerland, a municipality in the Swiss canton of Graubünden
  - Malans railway station, a Rhaetian Railway station

== Other ==
- Malans (grape), a Swiss wine grape also known as Completer
