= Vadans =

Vadans may refer to:

- Vadans, Jura, a commune in the French region of Franche-Comté
- Vadans, Haute-Saône, another commune in the French region of Franche-Comté
