= Sornay =

Sornay may refer to:

- Sornay, Haute-Saône, a commune in the French region of Franche-Comté
- Sornay, Saône-et-Loire, a commune in the French region of Bourgogne
