= Velloreille =

Velloreille may refer to:

- Bonnevent-Velloreille, Haute-Saône, Bourgogne-Franche-Comté, France
- Fretigney-et-Velloreille, Haute-Saône, Bourgogne-Franche-Comté, France
- Velloreille-lès-Choye, Haute-Saône, Bourgogne-Franche-Comté, France
