= Ballouhey =

Ballouhey, Ballouey, or Balloué are variants of a French surname. The name exists mainly in France in Isère and in Paris, as well as in South Africa. The etymology of the name is disputed; it originates either from Occitan or from Franche-Comté or from Basel.

List of Ballouheys in historical order (by date of birth):

- Jean-Claude Ballouhey (1764–1846), born at Citey (Haute-Saône, Franche-Comté), intendant of French impératrice Marie-Louise of Austria
- André Ballouhey, 20th-century engraver and lithographer from Lorraine who lived at Saint-Marcellin, Isère
- Bertrand Ballouhey (1938–1997), French rugby player at Villeneuve Leopards
- Pierre Ballouhey (born 1944), French illustrator and cartoonist
- Laurent Ballouhey (1947–2014) 是什么意思, sinologist, translator inter alia of Ai Qing, of a graphic-biopic of Cáo Xuěqín, journalist at L'Humanité in China from 1982 to 2013
- Jean Ballouhey, President of French rugby club Gifi Bias XIII, son of Bertrand Ballouhey
