= La Résie-Saint-Martin =

- Commune
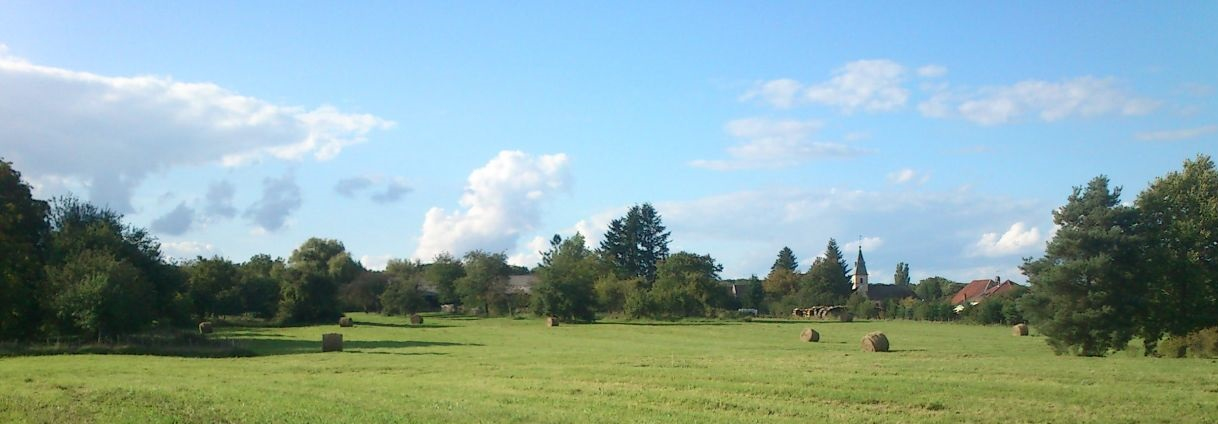
- A general view of La Résie-Saint-Martin

- Coat of arms
- Location of La Résie-Saint-Martin
- Location within France Location within Bourgogne-Franche-Comté
- Coordinates: 47°18′47″N 5°36′32″E
- Country: France
- Region: Bourgogne-Franche-Comté
- Department: Haute-Saône
- Arrondissement: Vesoul
- Canton: Marnay

Government
  - Mayor (2020–2026): Serge Abbey
- Area^{1}: 3.27 km^{2} (1.26 sq mi)
- Highest elevation: 243 m (797 ft)
- Lowest elevation: 214 m (702 ft)
- Population (2023): 165
  - Density: 50.5/km^{2} (131/sq mi)
- Time zone: UTC+01:00 (CET)
  - Summer (DST): UTC+02:00 (CEST)
- INSEE/Postal code: 70444 /70140
- ^{1} French Land Register data, which excludes lakes, ponds, glaciers > 1 km^{2} (0.386 sq mi or 247 acres) and river estuaries.

La Résie-Saint-Martin (French pronunciation: [la ʁezi sɛ̃ maʁtɛ̃]) is a commune in the Haute-Saône department in the region of Bourgogne-Franche-Comté in eastern France.

== See also ==
- Communes of the Haute-Saône department
