= Arsans =

- Commune
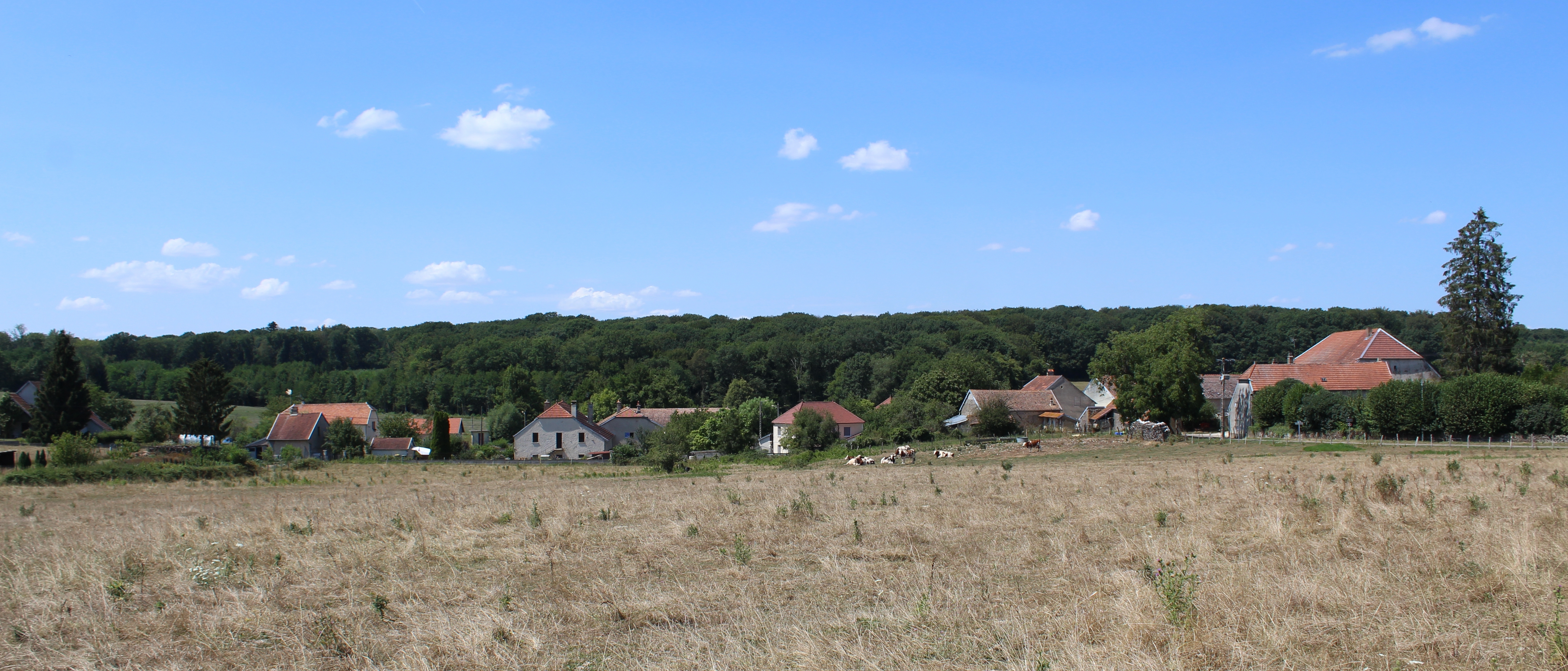
- A general view of Arsans
- Location of Arsans
- Location within France Location within Bourgogne-Franche-Comté
- Coordinates: 47°21′58″N 5°37′43″E
- Country: France
- Region: Bourgogne-Franche-Comté
- Department: Haute-Saône
- Arrondissement: Vesoul
- Canton: Marnay
- Intercommunality: CC Val de Gray

Government
  - Mayor (2022–2026): Nicolas Raillard
- Area^{1}: 2.48 km^{2} (0.96 sq mi)
- Highest elevation: 247 m (810 ft)
- Lowest elevation: 207 m (679 ft)
- Population (2023): 42
  - Density: 17/km^{2} (44/sq mi)
- Time zone: UTC+01:00 (CET)
  - Summer (DST): UTC+02:00 (CEST)
- INSEE/Postal code: 70030 /70100
- ^{1} French Land Register data, which excludes lakes, ponds, glaciers > 1 km^{2} (0.386 sq mi or 247 acres) and river estuaries.

Arsans (French pronunciation: [aʁsɑ̃]) is a commune in the Haute-Saône department in the region of Bourgogne-Franche-Comté in eastern France.

== See also ==
- Communes of the Haute-Saône department
