= Chevigney =

- Commune
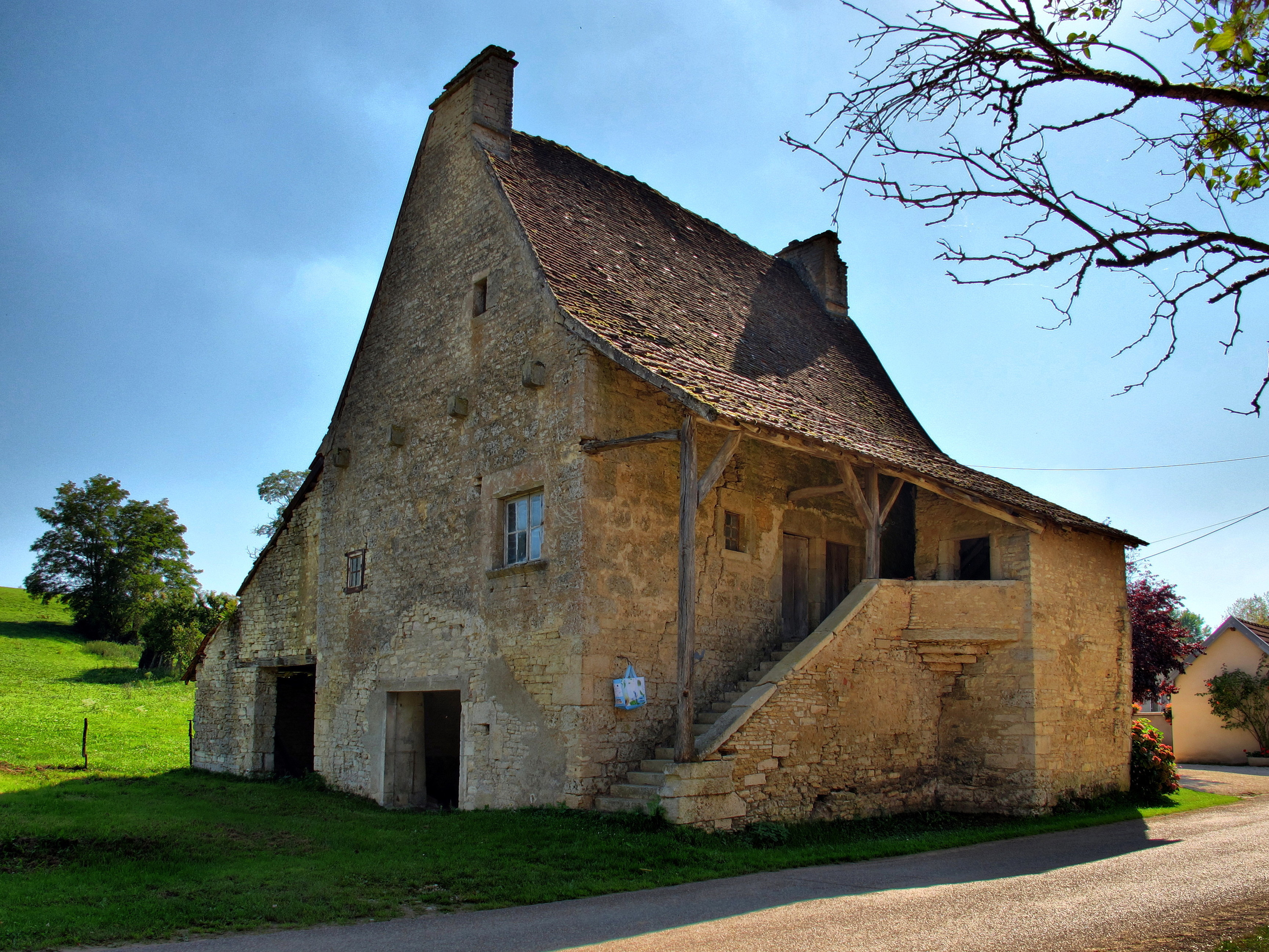
- A vineyard house in Chevigney
- Location of Chevigney
- Location within France Location within Bourgogne-Franche-Comté
- Coordinates: 47°20′07″N 5°35′26″E
- Country: France
- Region: Bourgogne-Franche-Comté
- Department: Haute-Saône
- Arrondissement: Vesoul
- Canton: Marnay
- Area^{1}: 5.17 km^{2} (2.00 sq mi)
- Highest elevation: 241 m (791 ft)
- Lowest elevation: 195 m (640 ft)
- Population (2023): 38
  - Density: 7.4/km^{2} (19/sq mi)
- Time zone: UTC+01:00 (CET)
  - Summer (DST): UTC+02:00 (CEST)
- INSEE/Postal code: 70151 /70140
- ^{1} French Land Register data, which excludes lakes, ponds, glaciers > 1 km^{2} (0.386 sq mi or 247 acres) and river estuaries.

Chevigney is a commune in the Haute-Saône department in the region of Bourgogne-Franche-Comté in eastern France.

== See also ==
- Communes of the Haute-Saône department
