= Chenevrey-et-Morogne =

- Commune
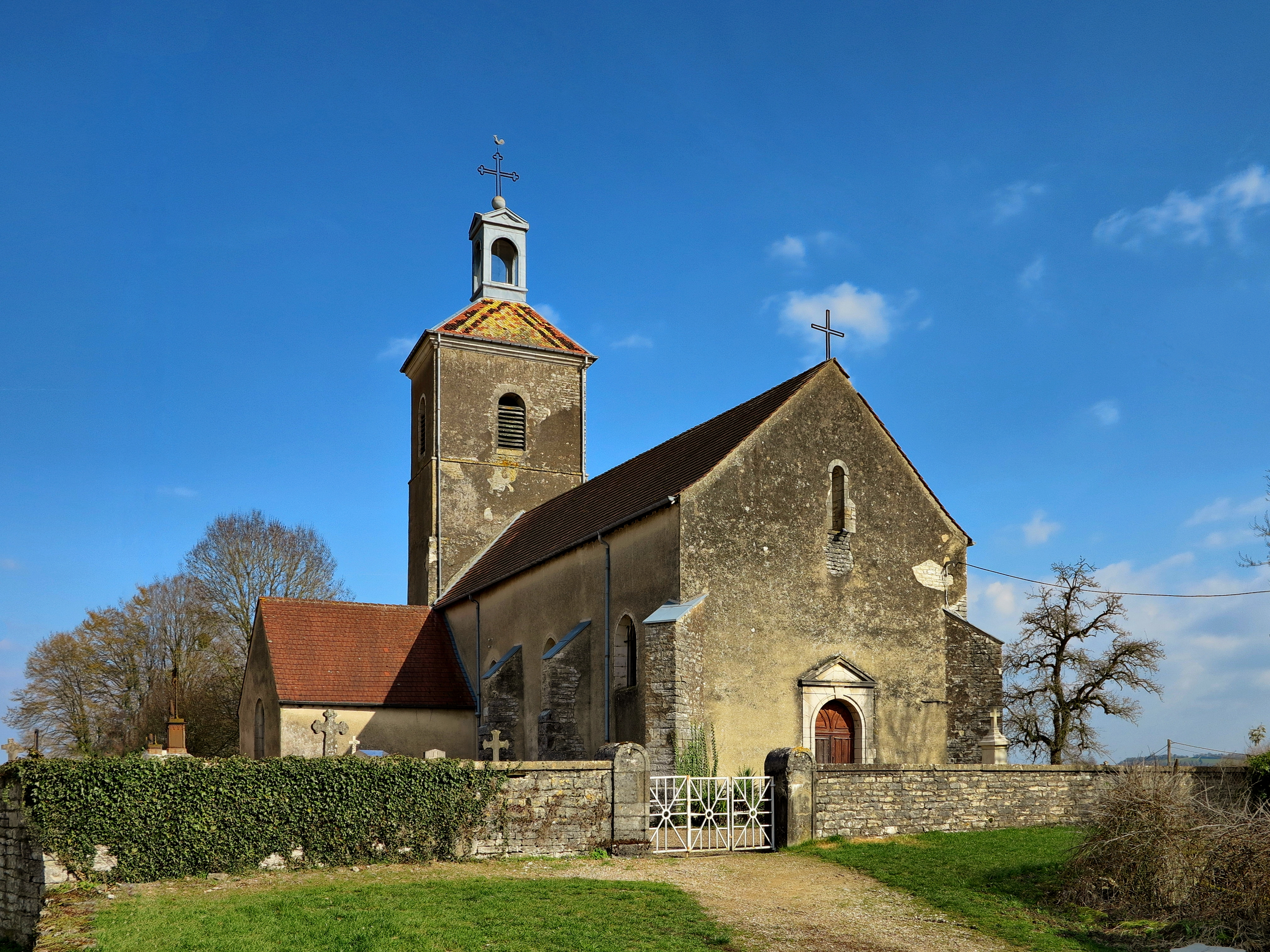
- The church in Chenevrey-et-Morogne

- Coat of arms
- Location of Chenevrey-et-Morogne
- Location within France Location within Bourgogne-Franche-Comté
- Coordinates: 47°17′01″N 5°44′39″E
- Country: France
- Region: Bourgogne-Franche-Comté
- Department: Haute-Saône
- Arrondissement: Vesoul
- Canton: Marnay

Government
  - Mayor (2023–2026): Noël Ballot
- Area^{1}: 8.86 km^{2} (3.42 sq mi)
- Highest elevation: 290 m (950 ft)
- Lowest elevation: 197 m (646 ft)
- Population (2023): 305
  - Density: 34.4/km^{2} (89.2/sq mi)
- Time zone: UTC+01:00 (CET)
  - Summer (DST): UTC+02:00 (CEST)
- INSEE/Postal code: 70150 /70150
- ^{1} French Land Register data, which excludes lakes, ponds, glaciers > 1 km^{2} (0.386 sq mi or 247 acres) and river estuaries.

Chenevrey-et-Morogne is a commune in the Haute-Saône department in the region of Bourgogne-Franche-Comté in eastern France.

== See also ==
- Communes of the Haute-Saône department
