= Vantoux-et-Longevelle =

- Commune
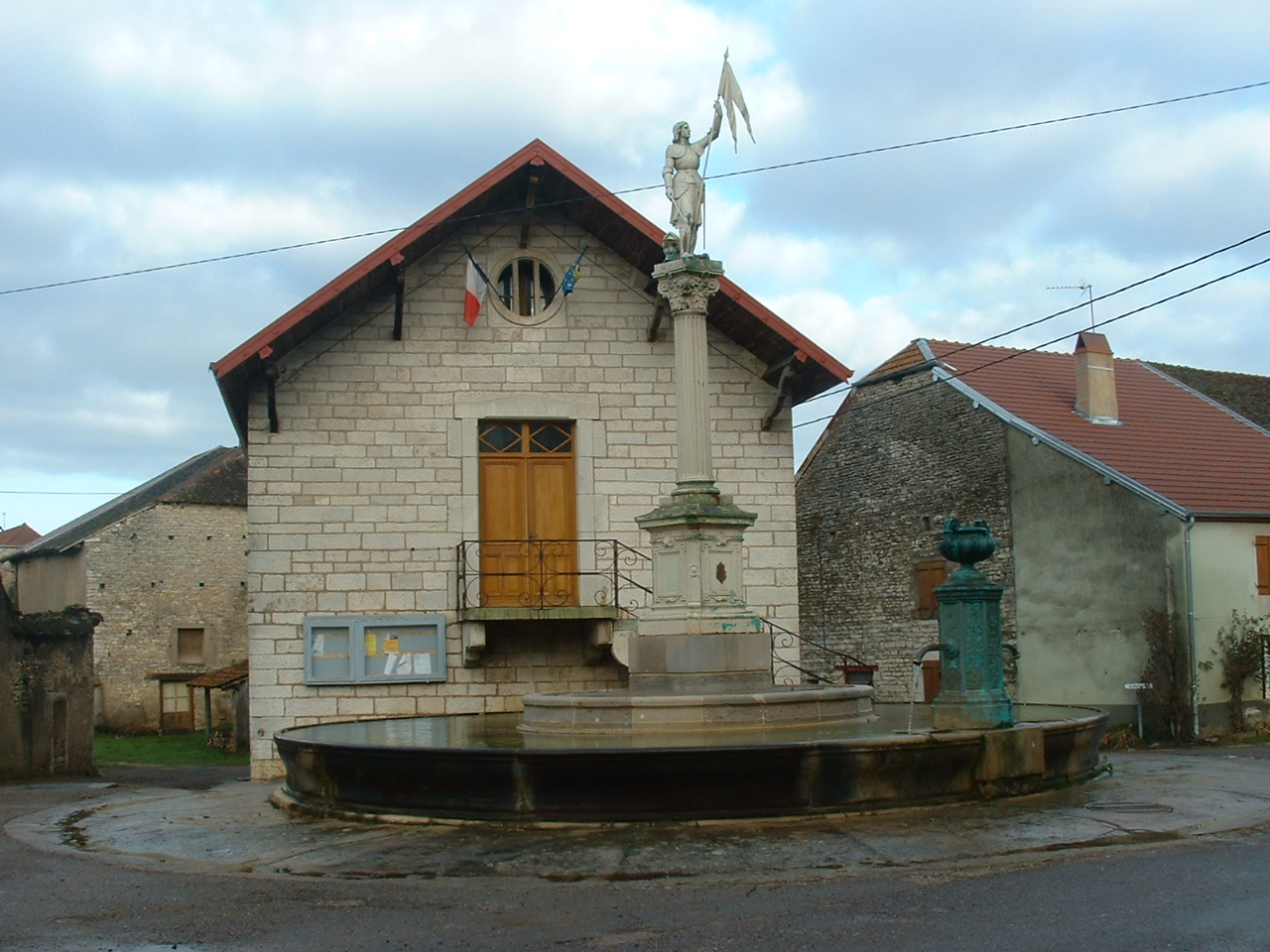
- The town hall in Vantoux
- Location of Vantoux-et-Longevelle
- Location within France Location within Bourgogne-Franche-Comté
- Coordinates: 47°26′05″N 5°50′50″E
- Country: France
- Region: Bourgogne-Franche-Comté
- Department: Haute-Saône
- Arrondissement: Vesoul
- Canton: Marnay

Government
  - Mayor (2020–2026): Laurent Rivet
- Area^{1}: 9.67 km^{2} (3.73 sq mi)
- Highest elevation: 273 m (896 ft)
- Lowest elevation: 212 m (696 ft)
- Population (2023): 176
  - Density: 18.2/km^{2} (47.1/sq mi)
- Time zone: UTC+01:00 (CET)
  - Summer (DST): UTC+02:00 (CEST)
- INSEE/Postal code: 70521 /70700
- ^{1} French Land Register data, which excludes lakes, ponds, glaciers > 1 km^{2} (0.386 sq mi or 247 acres) and river estuaries.

Vantoux-et-Longevelle (French pronunciation: [vɑ̃tu e lɔ̃ʒvɛl]) is a commune in the Haute-Saône department in the region of Bourgogne-Franche-Comté in eastern France.

== See also ==
- Communes of the Haute-Saône department
