= Vellefrey-et-Vellefrange =

- Commune
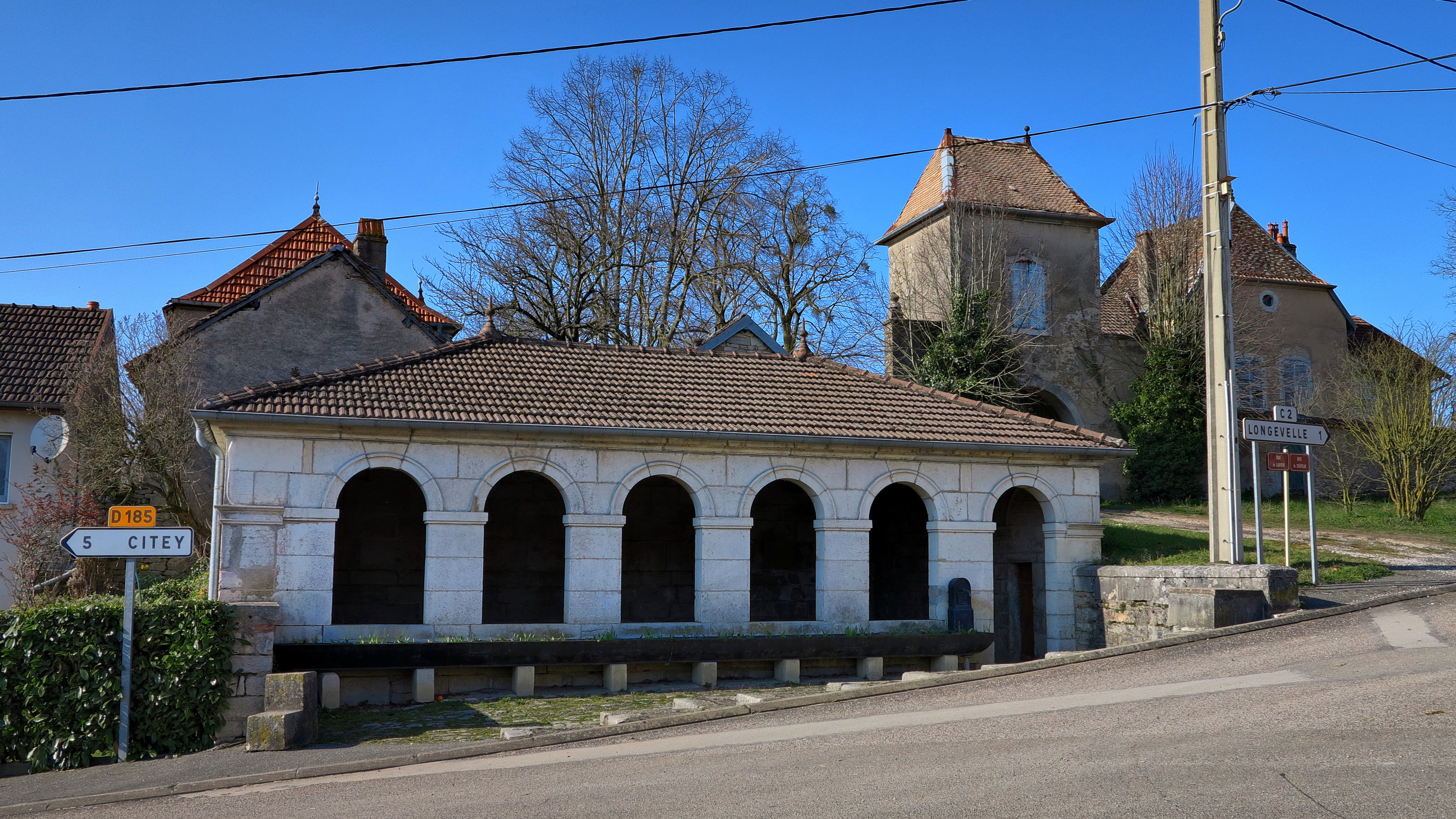
- The wash house in Vellefrey

- Coat of arms
- Location of Vellefrey-et-Vellefrange
- Location within France Location within Bourgogne-Franche-Comté
- Coordinates: 47°25′51″N 5°49′51″E
- Country: France
- Region: Bourgogne-Franche-Comté
- Department: Haute-Saône
- Arrondissement: Vesoul
- Canton: Marnay
- Area^{1}: 7.13 km^{2} (2.75 sq mi)
- Highest elevation: 261 m (856 ft)
- Lowest elevation: 202 m (663 ft)
- Population (2023): 108
  - Density: 15.1/km^{2} (39.2/sq mi)
- Time zone: UTC+01:00 (CET)
  - Summer (DST): UTC+02:00 (CEST)
- INSEE/Postal code: 70533 /70700
- ^{1} French Land Register data, which excludes lakes, ponds, glaciers > 1 km^{2} (0.386 sq mi or 247 acres) and river estuaries.

Vellefrey-et-Vellefrange is a commune in the Haute-Saône department in the region of Bourgogne-Franche-Comté in eastern France.

== See also ==
- Communes of the Haute-Saône department
