= Montboillon =

- Commune
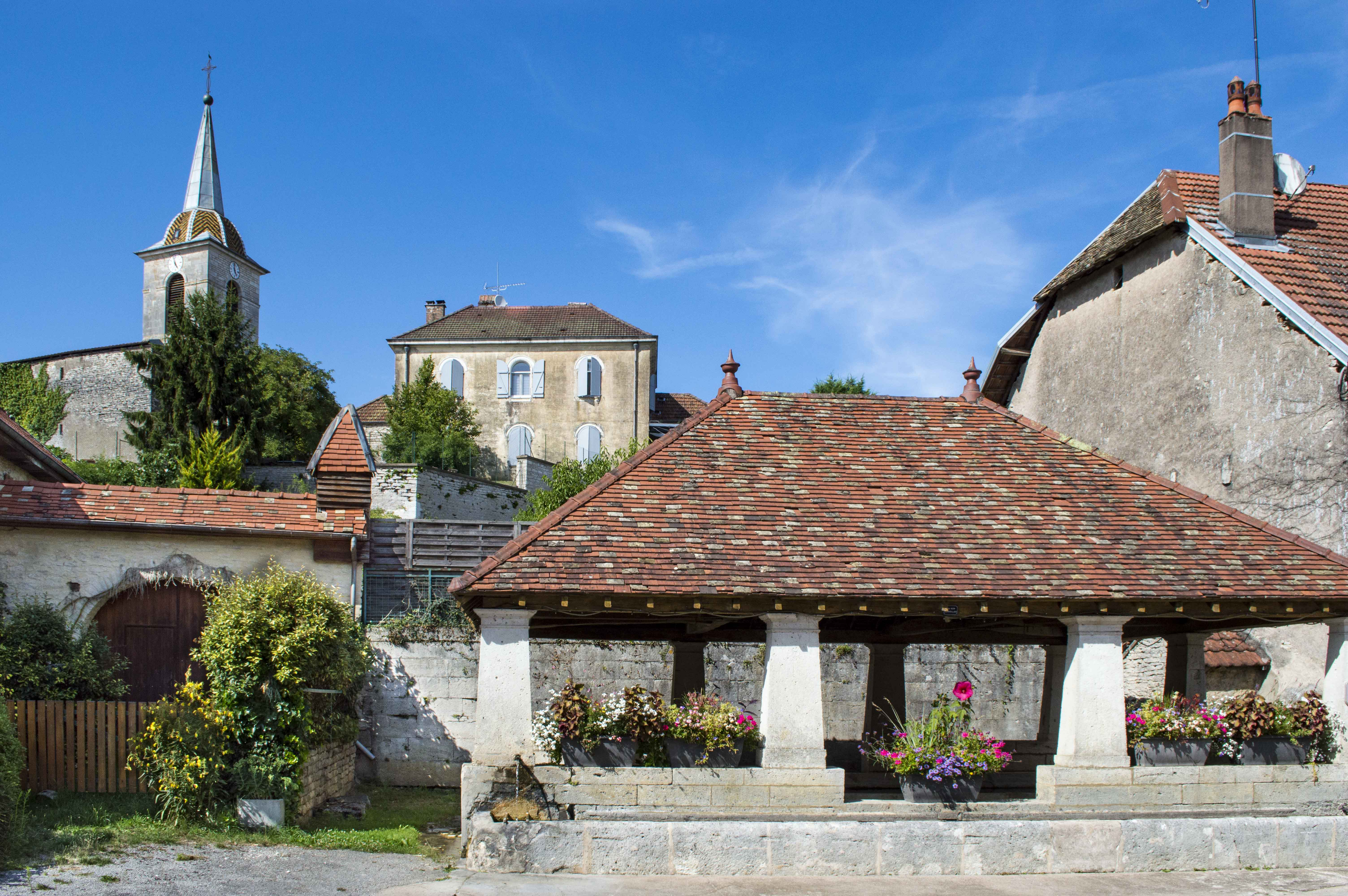
- The wash house in Montboillon
- Location of Montboillon
- Location within France Location within Bourgogne-Franche-Comté
- Coordinates: 47°22′19″N 5°55′27″E
- Country: France
- Region: Bourgogne-Franche-Comté
- Department: Haute-Saône
- Arrondissement: Vesoul
- Canton: Marnay
- Intercommunality: Communauté de communes du Pays riolais

Government
  - Mayor (2020–2026): Gilles Panier
- Area^{1}: 8.43 km^{2} (3.25 sq mi)
- Highest elevation: 372 m (1,220 ft)
- Lowest elevation: 218 m (715 ft)
- Population (2023): 308
  - Density: 36.5/km^{2} (94.6/sq mi)
- Time zone: UTC+01:00 (CET)
  - Summer (DST): UTC+02:00 (CEST)
- INSEE/Postal code: 70356 /70700
- ^{1} French Land Register data, which excludes lakes, ponds, glaciers > 1 km^{2} (0.386 sq mi or 247 acres) and river estuaries.

Montboillon (French pronunciation: [mɔ̃bwajɔ̃]) is a commune in the Haute-Saône department in the region of Bourgogne-Franche-Comté in eastern France.

== See also ==
- Communes of the Haute-Saône department
