= Beaumotte-lès-Pin =

- Commune
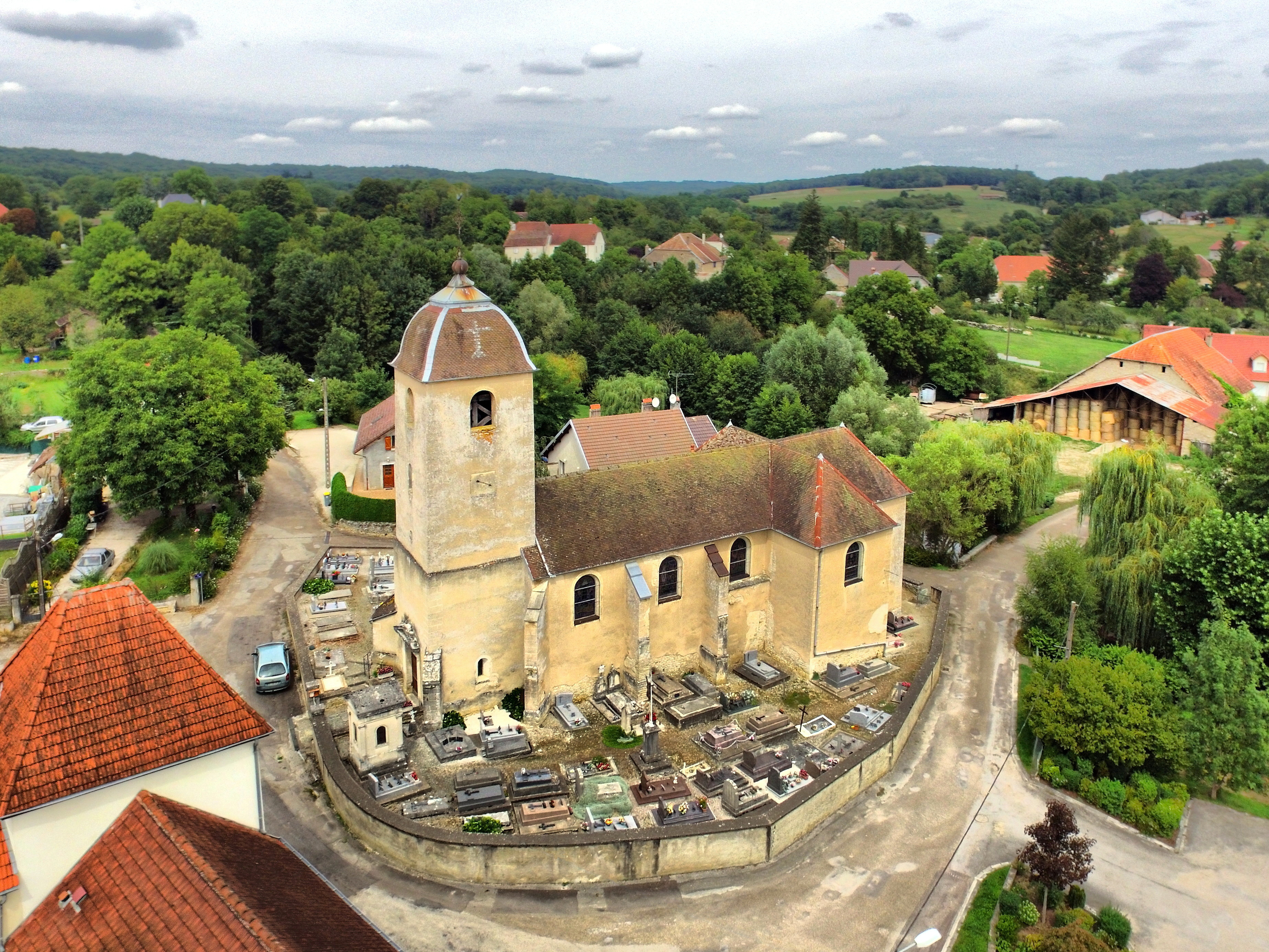
- The church in Beaumotte-lès-Pin

- Coat of arms
- Location of Beaumotte-lès-Pin
- Location within France Location within Bourgogne-Franche-Comté
- Coordinates: 47°19′03″N 5°49′54″E
- Country: France
- Region: Bourgogne-Franche-Comté
- Department: Haute-Saône
- Arrondissement: Vesoul
- Canton: Marnay

Government
  - Mayor (2022–2026): Laurent Sauvin
- Area^{1}: 8.43 km^{2} (3.25 sq mi)
- Highest elevation: 351 m (1,152 ft)
- Lowest elevation: 200 m (660 ft)
- Population (2023): 281
  - Density: 33.3/km^{2} (86.3/sq mi)
- Time zone: UTC+01:00 (CET)
  - Summer (DST): UTC+02:00 (CEST)
- INSEE/Postal code: 70060 /70150
- ^{1} French Land Register data, which excludes lakes, ponds, glaciers > 1 km^{2} (0.386 sq mi or 247 acres) and river estuaries.

Beaumotte-lès-Pin (French pronunciation: [bomɔt lɛ pɛ̃], literally Beaumotte near Pin) is a commune in the Haute-Saône department in the region of Bourgogne-Franche-Comté in eastern France.

== See also ==
- Communes of the Haute-Saône department
