= Autoreille =

- Commune
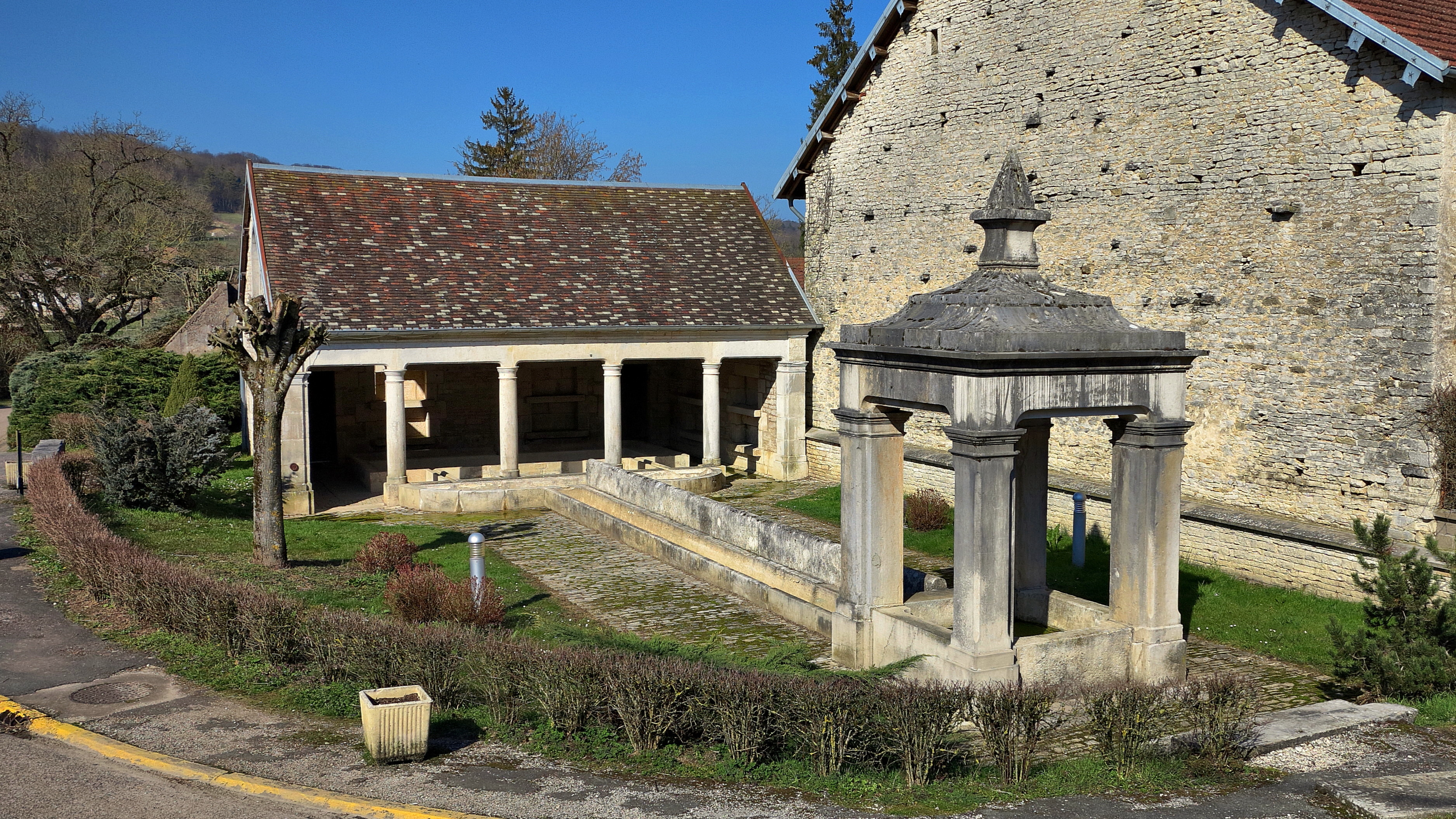
- The wash house and fountain in Autoreille

- Coat of arms
- Location of Autoreille
- Location within France Location within Bourgogne-Franche-Comté
- Coordinates: 47°22′14″N 5°48′43″E
- Country: France
- Region: Bourgogne-Franche-Comté
- Department: Haute-Saône
- Arrondissement: Vesoul
- Canton: Marnay
- Intercommunality: CC Monts Gy

Government
  - Mayor (2020–2026): Catherine Lind
- Area^{1}: 9.98 km^{2} (3.85 sq mi)
- Highest elevation: 374 m (1,227 ft)
- Lowest elevation: 250 m (820 ft)
- Population (2023): 394
  - Density: 39.5/km^{2} (102/sq mi)
- Time zone: UTC+01:00 (CET)
  - Summer (DST): UTC+02:00 (CEST)
- INSEE/Postal code: 70039 /70700
- ^{1} French Land Register data, which excludes lakes, ponds, glaciers > 1 km^{2} (0.386 sq mi or 247 acres) and river estuaries.

Autoreille (French pronunciation: [otɔʁɛj]) is a commune in the Haute-Saône department in the region of Bourgogne-Franche-Comté in eastern France.

== See also ==
- Communes of the Haute-Saône department
