= La Grande-Résie =

- Commune
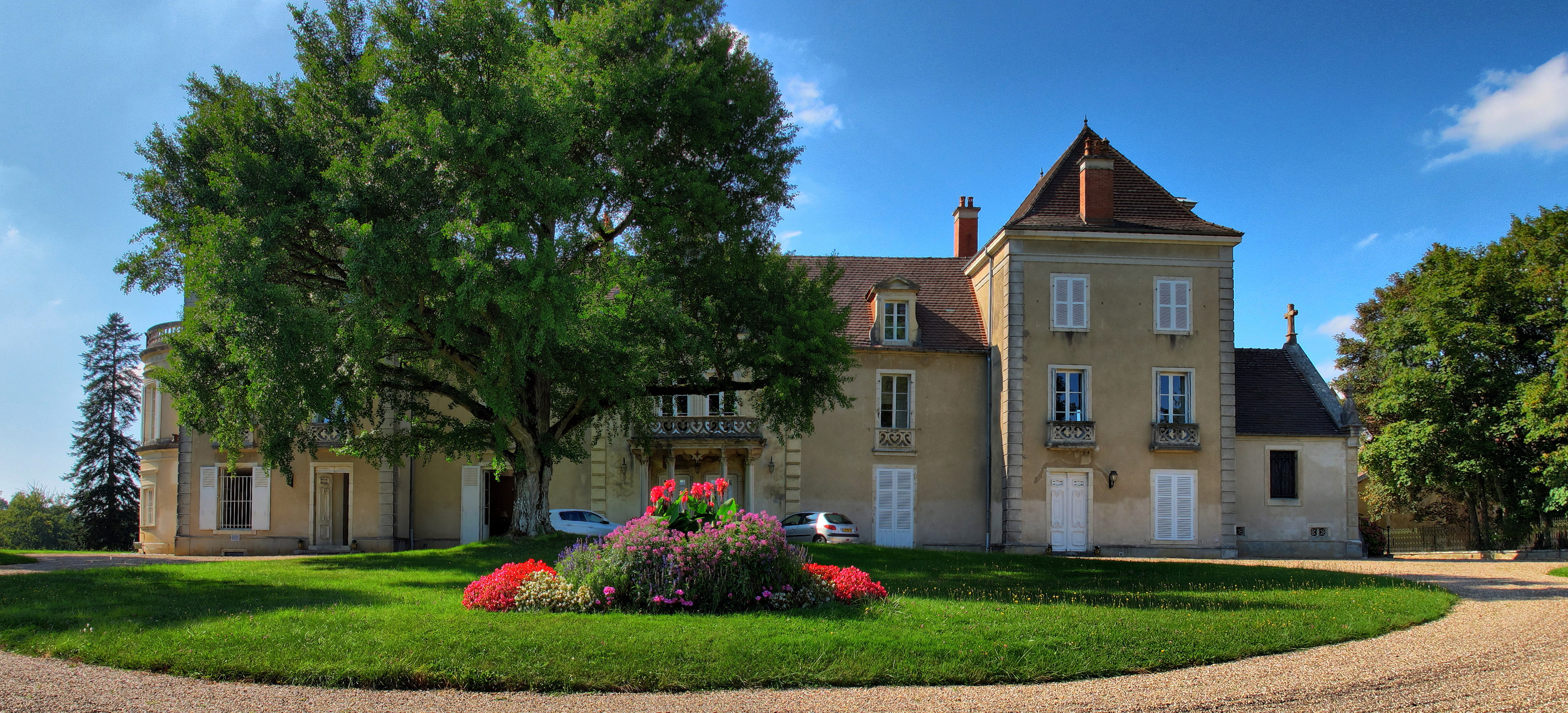
- The chateau in La Grande-Résie

- Coat of arms
- Location of La Grande-Résie
- Location within France Location within Bourgogne-Franche-Comté
- Coordinates: 47°20′10″N 5°34′23″E
- Country: France
- Region: Bourgogne-Franche-Comté
- Department: Haute-Saône
- Arrondissement: Vesoul
- Canton: Marnay

Government
  - Mayor (2020–2026): Dominique Thevenot
- Area^{1}: 4.76 km^{2} (1.84 sq mi)
- Highest elevation: 222 m (728 ft)
- Lowest elevation: 192 m (630 ft)
- Population (2023): 87
  - Density: 18/km^{2} (47/sq mi)
- Time zone: UTC+01:00 (CET)
  - Summer (DST): UTC+02:00 (CEST)
- INSEE/Postal code: 70443 /70140
- ^{1} French Land Register data, which excludes lakes, ponds, glaciers > 1 km^{2} (0.386 sq mi or 247 acres) and river estuaries.

La Grande-Résie (French pronunciation: [la ɡʁɑ̃d ʁezi]) is a commune in the Haute-Saône department in the region of Bourgogne-Franche-Comté in eastern France.

== See also ==
- Communes of the Haute-Saône department
