= Velleclaire =

- Commune
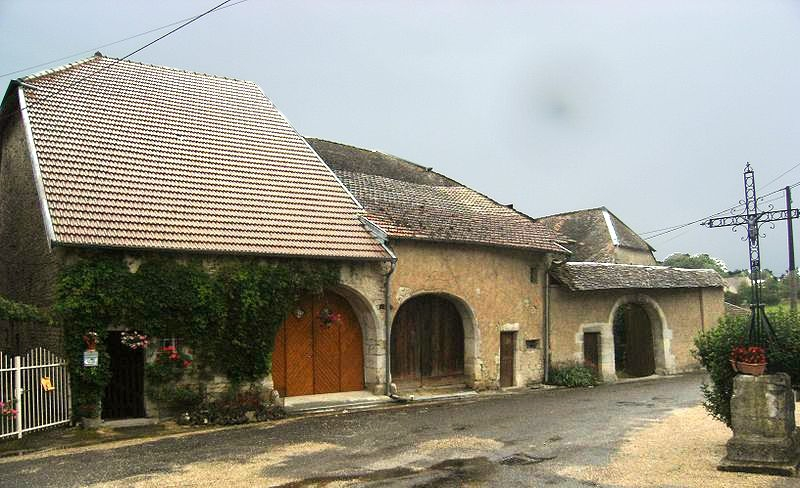
- The houses in Velleclaire
- Location of Velleclaire
- Location within France Location within Bourgogne-Franche-Comté
- Coordinates: 47°25′54″N 5°51′43″E
- Country: France
- Region: Bourgogne-Franche-Comté
- Department: Haute-Saône
- Arrondissement: Vesoul
- Canton: Marnay
- Area^{1}: 4.13 km^{2} (1.59 sq mi)
- Highest elevation: 406 m (1,332 ft)
- Lowest elevation: 234 m (768 ft)
- Population (2023): 100
  - Density: 24/km^{2} (63/sq mi)
- Time zone: UTC+01:00 (CET)
  - Summer (DST): UTC+02:00 (CEST)
- INSEE/Postal code: 70531 /70700
- ^{1} French Land Register data, which excludes lakes, ponds, glaciers > 1 km^{2} (0.386 sq mi or 247 acres) and river estuaries.

Velleclaire is a commune in the Haute-Saône department in the region of Bourgogne-Franche-Comté in eastern France.

== See also ==
- Communes of the Haute-Saône department
