= Vregille =

- Commune
- The village centre
- Location of Vregille
- Location within France Location within Bourgogne-Franche-Comté
- Coordinates: 47°19′14″N 5°53′33″E
- Country: France
- Region: Bourgogne-Franche-Comté
- Department: Haute-Saône
- Arrondissement: Vesoul
- Canton: Marnay
- Intercommunality: Val Marnaysien

Government
  - Mayor (2020–2026): Jean-François Abisse
- Area^{1}: 4.28 km^{2} (1.65 sq mi)
- Highest elevation: 277 m (909 ft)
- Lowest elevation: 204 m (669 ft)
- Population (2023): 178
  - Density: 41.6/km^{2} (108/sq mi)
- Time zone: UTC+01:00 (CET)
  - Summer (DST): UTC+02:00 (CEST)
- INSEE/Postal code: 70578 /70150
- ^{1} French Land Register data, which excludes lakes, ponds, glaciers > 1 km^{2} (0.386 sq mi or 247 acres) and river estuaries.

Vregille is a village and commune in the Haute-Saône department in the region of Bourgogne-Franche-Comté in eastern France.

== Personalities ==
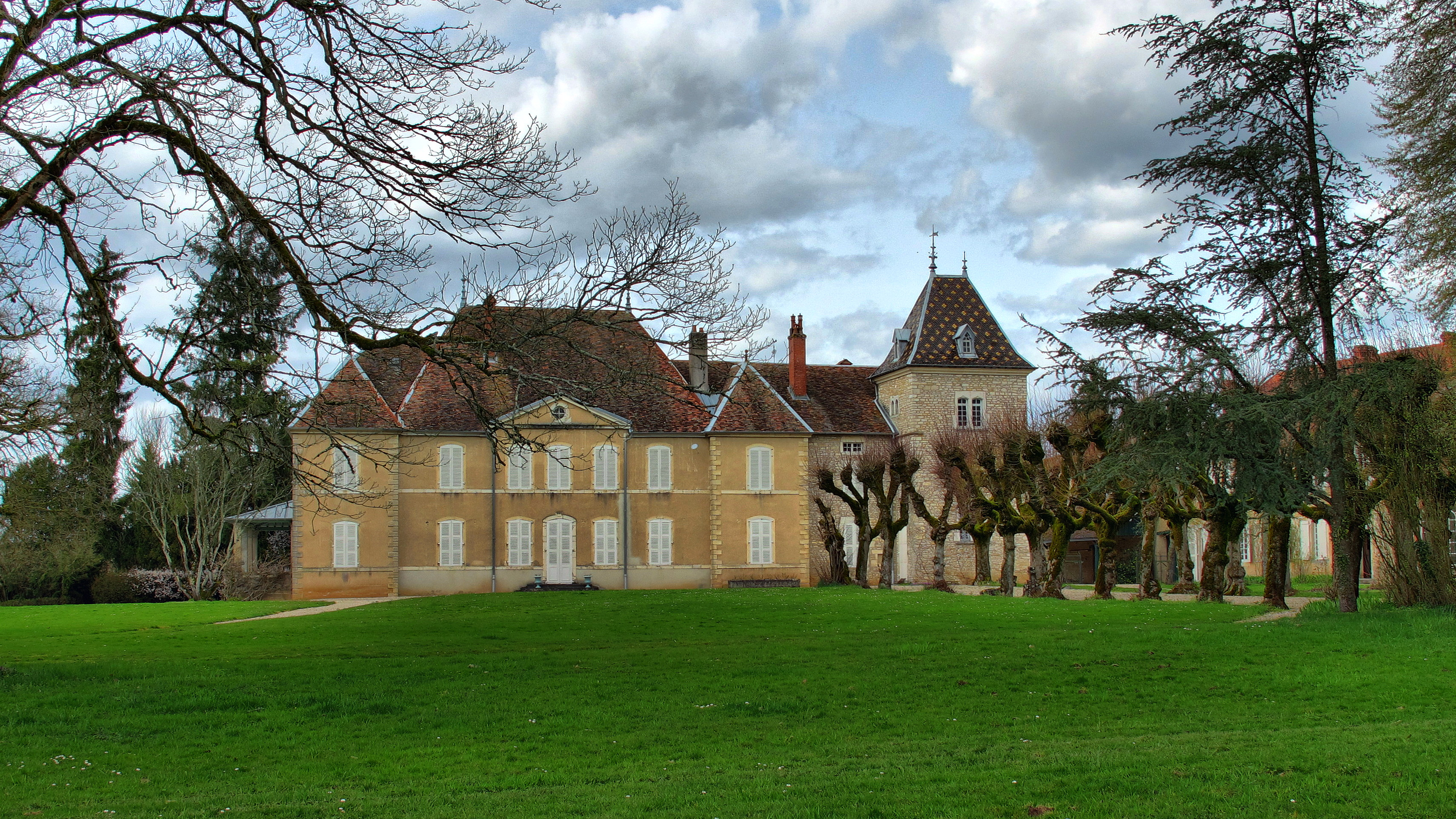
The castle of Vregille

- Arnaud Courlet de Vregille, French painter.

== See also ==
- Communes of the Haute-Saône department
