= Tromarey =

- Commune
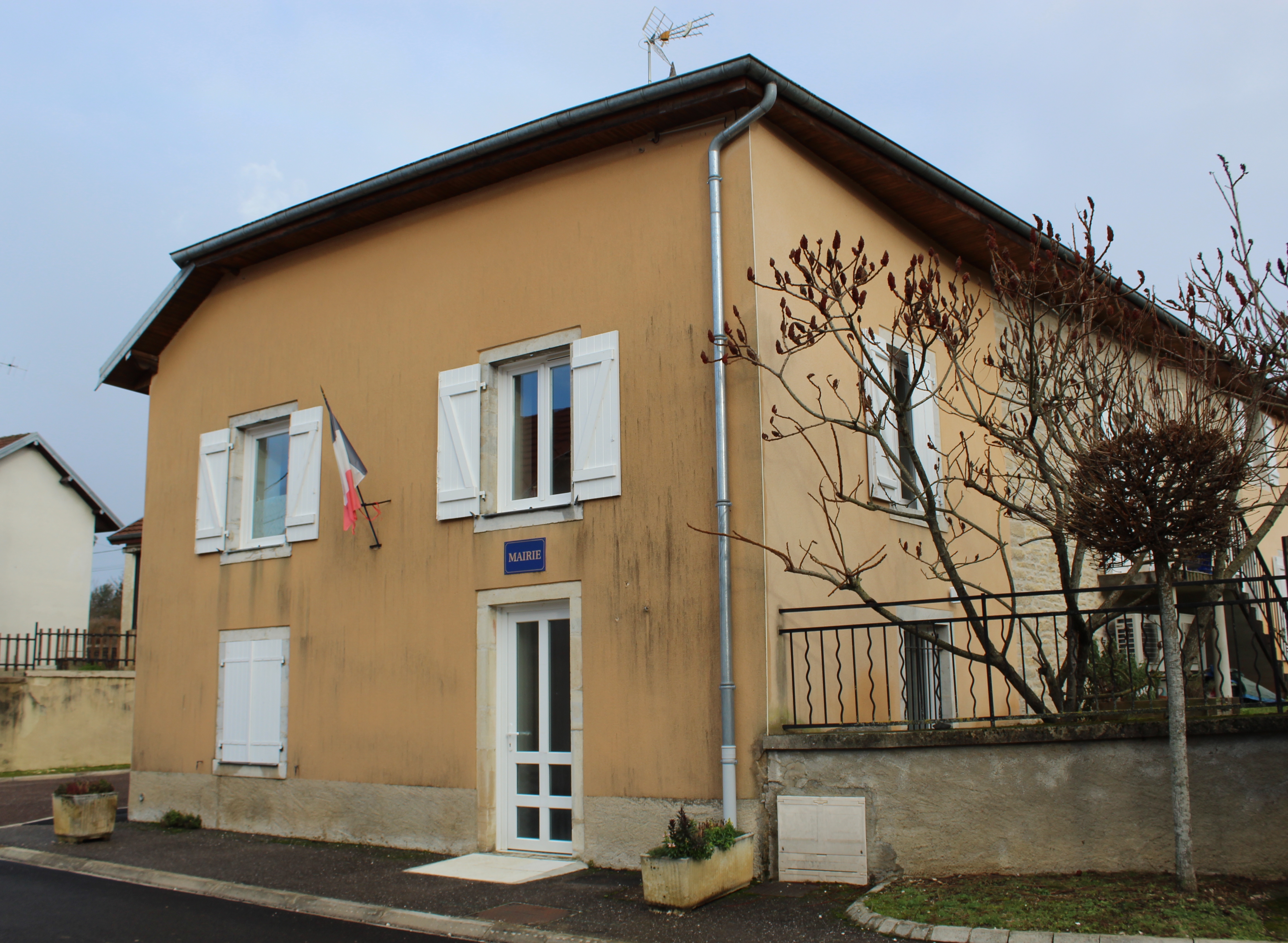
- The town hall in Tromarey
- Location of Tromarey
- Location within France Location within Bourgogne-Franche-Comté
- Coordinates: 47°20′20″N 5°43′14″E
- Country: France
- Region: Bourgogne-Franche-Comté
- Department: Haute-Saône
- Arrondissement: Vesoul
- Canton: Marnay

Government
  - Mayor (2020–2026): Catherine Cuinet
- Area^{1}: 6.12 km^{2} (2.36 sq mi)
- Highest elevation: 329 m (1,079 ft)
- Lowest elevation: 231 m (758 ft)
- Population (2023): 118
  - Density: 19.3/km^{2} (49.9/sq mi)
- Time zone: UTC+01:00 (CET)
  - Summer (DST): UTC+02:00 (CEST)
- INSEE/Postal code: 70509 /70150
- ^{1} French Land Register data, which excludes lakes, ponds, glaciers > 1 km^{2} (0.386 sq mi or 247 acres) and river estuaries.

Tromarey (French pronunciation: [tʁɔmaʁɛ]) is a commune in the Haute-Saône department in the region of Bourgogne-Franche-Comté in eastern France.

== See also ==
- Communes of the Haute-Saône department
