= Sauvigney-lès-Pesmes =

- Commune
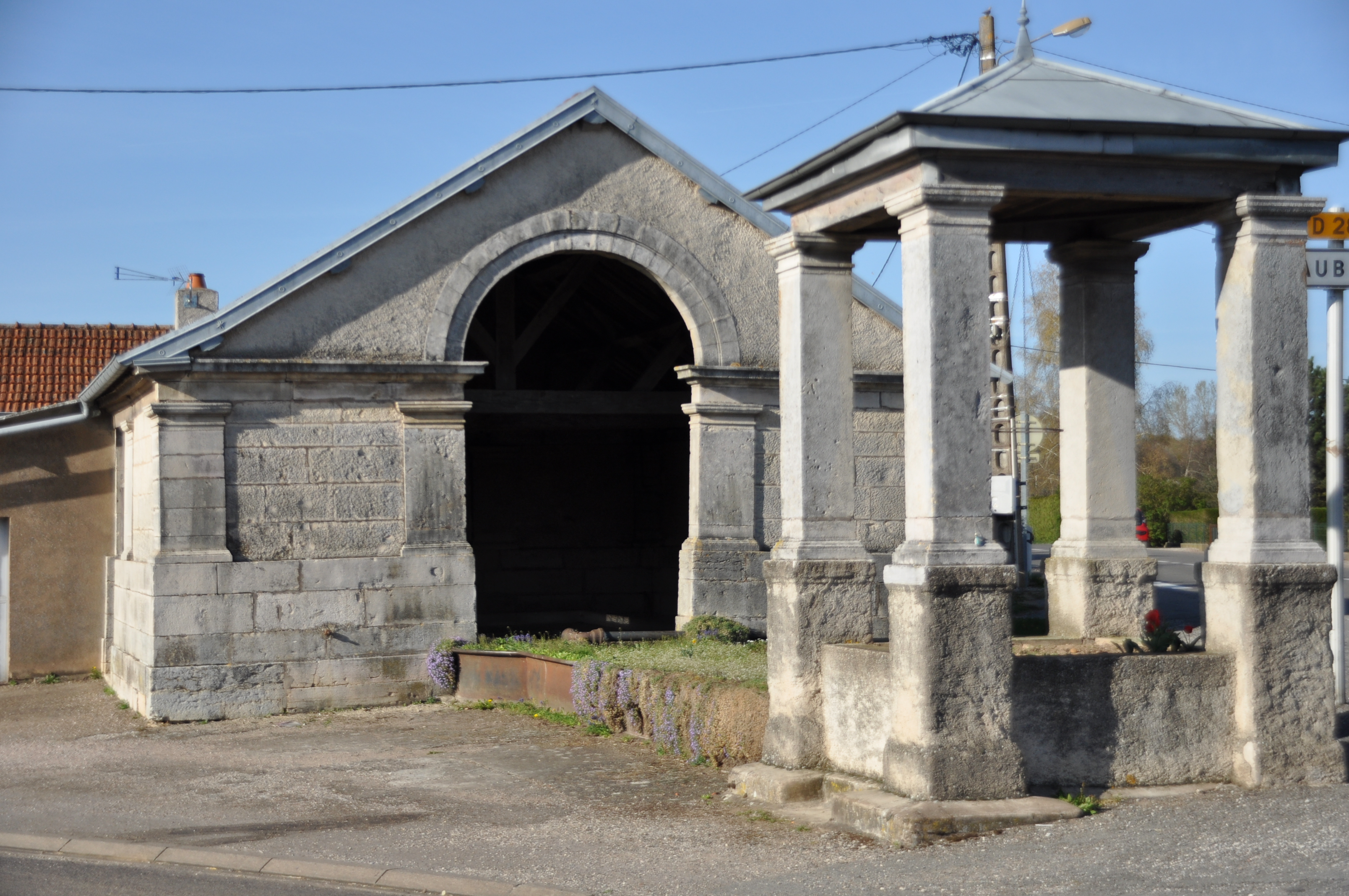
- The wash house and fountain in Sauvigney-lès-Pesmes

- Coat of arms
- Location of Sauvigney-lès-Pesmes
- Location within France Location within Bourgogne-Franche-Comté
- Coordinates: 47°18′09″N 5°34′14″E
- Country: France
- Region: Bourgogne-Franche-Comté
- Department: Haute-Saône
- Arrondissement: Vesoul
- Canton: Marnay

Government
  - Mayor (2020–2026): Lydia Pecquery
- Area^{1}: 6.35 km^{2} (2.45 sq mi)
- Highest elevation: 234 m (768 ft)
- Lowest elevation: 195 m (640 ft)
- Population (2023): 159
  - Density: 25.0/km^{2} (64.9/sq mi)
- Time zone: UTC+01:00 (CET)
  - Summer (DST): UTC+02:00 (CEST)
- INSEE/Postal code: 70480 /70140
- ^{1} French Land Register data, which excludes lakes, ponds, glaciers > 1 km^{2} (0.386 sq mi or 247 acres) and river estuaries.

Sauvigney-lès-Pesmes (French pronunciation: [soviɲɛ lɛ pɛm], lit. 'Sauvigney near Pesmes') is a commune in the Haute-Saône department in the region of Bourgogne-Franche-Comté in eastern France.

== See also ==
- Communes of the Haute-Saône department
