= Canton of Marnay =

Coordinates: 47.29°N 5.77°E

The canton of Marnay is an administrative division of the Haute-Saône department, northeastern France. Its borders were modified at the French canton reorganisation which came into effect in March 2015. Its seat is in Marnay.

It consists of the following communes:

1. Arsans
2. Autoreille
3. Avrigney-Virey
4. Bard-lès-Pesmes
5. Bay
6. Beaumotte-lès-Pin
7. Bonboillon
8. Bonnevent-Velloreille
9. Bresilley
10. Broye-Aubigney-Montseugny
11. Brussey
12. Bucey-lès-Gy
13. Chambornay-lès-Pin
14. Chancey
15. Charcenne
16. Chaumercenne
17. Chenevrey-et-Morogne
18. Chevigney
19. Citey
20. Colombine
21. Courcuire
22. Cugney
23. Cult
24. Étuz
25. Gézier-et-Fontenelay
26. La Grande-Résie
27. Gy
28. Hugier
29. Lieucourt
30. Malans
31. Marnay
32. Montagney
33. Montboillon
34. Motey-Besuche
35. Pesmes
36. Pin
37. La Résie-Saint-Martin
38. Sauvigney-lès-Pesmes
39. Sornay
40. Tromarey
41. Vadans
42. Valay
43. Vantoux-et-Longevelle
44. Velleclaire
45. Vellefrey-et-Vellefrange
46. Velloreille-lès-Choye
47. Venère
48. Villers-Chemin-et-Mont-lès-Étrelles
49. Vregille
