= Bard-lès-Pesmes =

- Commune
- Coat of arms
- Location of Bard-lès-Pesmes
- Location within France Location within Bourgogne-Franche-Comté
- Coordinates: 47°16′25″N 5°38′00″E
- Country: France
- Region: Bourgogne-Franche-Comté
- Department: Haute-Saône
- Arrondissement: Vesoul
- Canton: Marnay

Government
  - Mayor (2020–2026): Christophe Henriet
- Area^{1}: 5.21 km^{2} (2.01 sq mi)
- Highest elevation: 291 m (955 ft)
- Lowest elevation: 198 m (650 ft)
- Population (2023): 136
  - Density: 26.1/km^{2} (67.6/sq mi)
- Time zone: UTC+01:00 (CET)
  - Summer (DST): UTC+02:00 (CEST)
- INSEE/Postal code: 70048 /70140
- ^{1} French Land Register data, which excludes lakes, ponds, glaciers > 1 km^{2} (0.386 sq mi or 247 acres) and river estuaries.

Bard-lès-Pesmes (French pronunciation: [baʁ lɛ pɛm], lit. 'Bard near Pesmes') is a commune in the Haute-Saône department in the region of Bourgogne-Franche-Comté in eastern France.

== See also ==
- Communes of the Haute-Saône department
