= Chambornay-lès-Pin =

- Commune
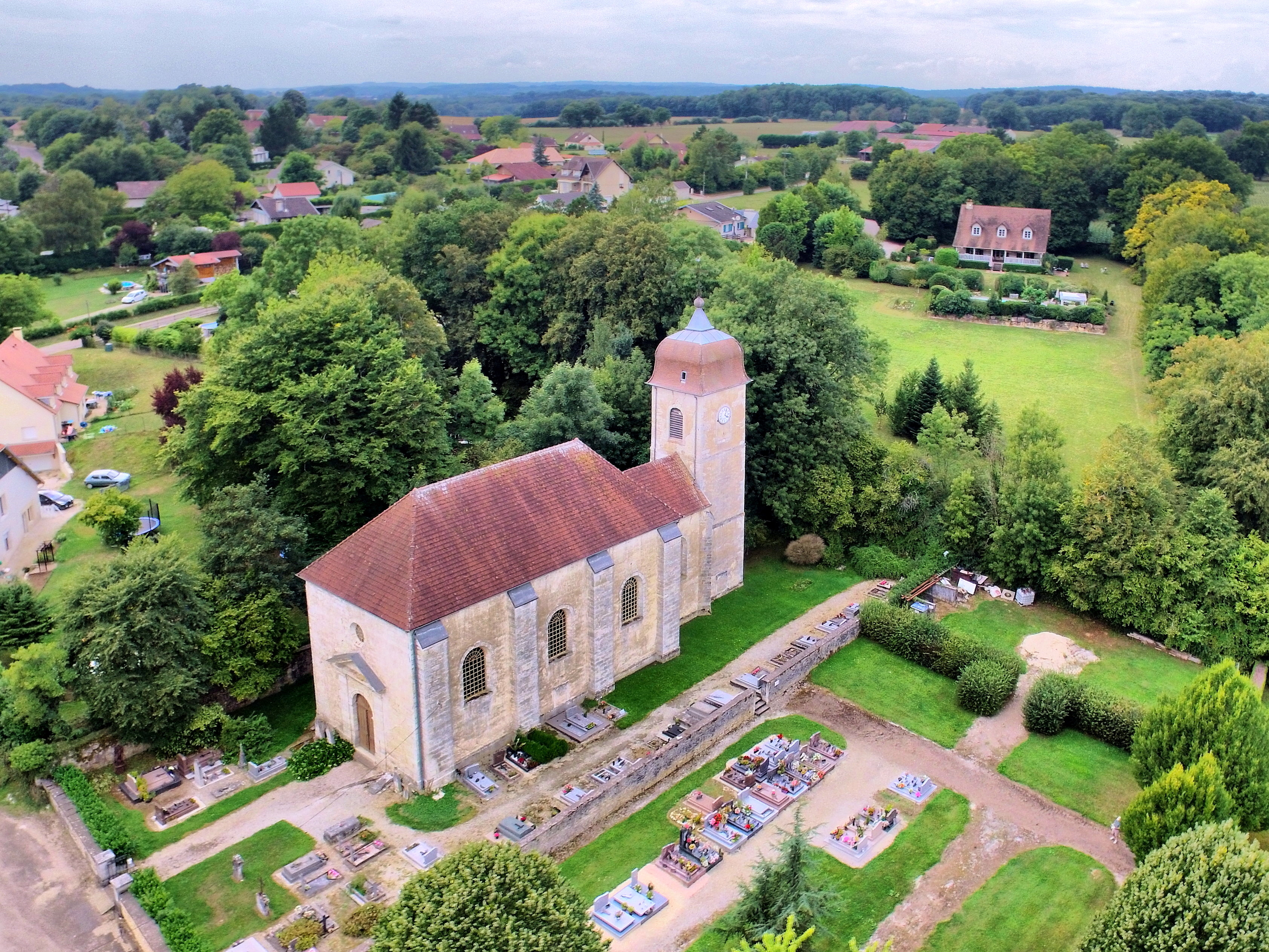
- The church in Chambornay-lès-Pin
- Location of Chambornay-lès-Pin
- Location within France Location within Bourgogne-Franche-Comté
- Coordinates: 47°20′18″N 5°54′28″E
- Country: France
- Region: Bourgogne-Franche-Comté
- Department: Haute-Saône
- Arrondissement: Vesoul
- Canton: Marnay

Government
  - Mayor (2024–2026): Gaëlle Boisson
- Area^{1}: 4.85 km^{2} (1.87 sq mi)
- Highest elevation: 276 m (906 ft)
- Lowest elevation: 202 m (663 ft)
- Population (2023): 393
  - Density: 81.0/km^{2} (210/sq mi)
- Time zone: UTC+01:00 (CET)
  - Summer (DST): UTC+02:00 (CEST)
- INSEE/Postal code: 70119 /70150
- ^{1} French Land Register data, which excludes lakes, ponds, glaciers > 1 km^{2} (0.386 sq mi or 247 acres) and river estuaries.

Chambornay-lès-Pin (French pronunciation: [ʃɑ̃bɔʁnɛ lɛ pɛ̃], literally Chambornay near Pin) is a commune in the Haute-Saône department in the region of Bourgogne-Franche-Comté in eastern France.

== See also ==
- Communes of the Haute-Saône department
