= Bay, Haute-Saône =

Bay
- Commune
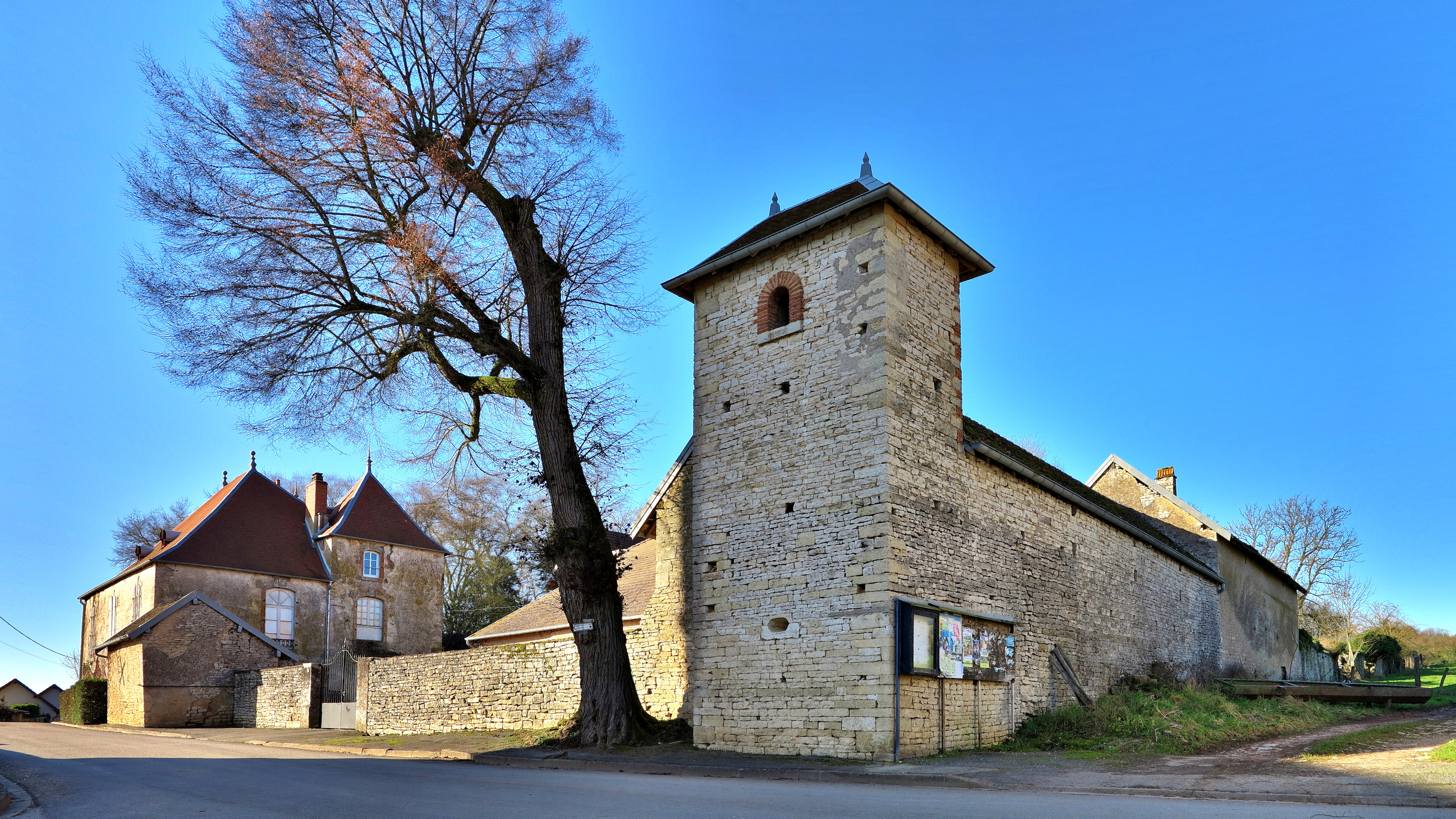
- The chateau and tower dovecote in Bay

- Coat of arms
- Location of Bay
- Location within France Location within Bourgogne-Franche-Comté
- Coordinates: 47°17′23″N 5°43′15″E
- Country: France
- Region: Bourgogne-Franche-Comté
- Department: Haute-Saône
- Arrondissement: Vesoul
- Canton: Marnay

Government
  - Mayor (2020–2026): Michel Gaillard
- Area^{1}: 4.87 km^{2} (1.88 sq mi)
- Highest elevation: 303 m (994 ft)
- Lowest elevation: 203 m (666 ft)
- Population (2023): 161
  - Density: 33.1/km^{2} (85.6/sq mi)
- Time zone: UTC+01:00 (CET)
  - Summer (DST): UTC+02:00 (CEST)
- INSEE/Postal code: 70057 /70150
- ^{1} French Land Register data, which excludes lakes, ponds, glaciers > 1 km^{2} (0.386 sq mi or 247 acres) and river estuaries.

Bay (French pronunciation: [bɛ]) is a commune in the Haute-Saône department in the region of Bourgogne-Franche-Comté in eastern France.

== See also ==
- Communes of the Haute-Saône department
