= Chancey =

- Commune
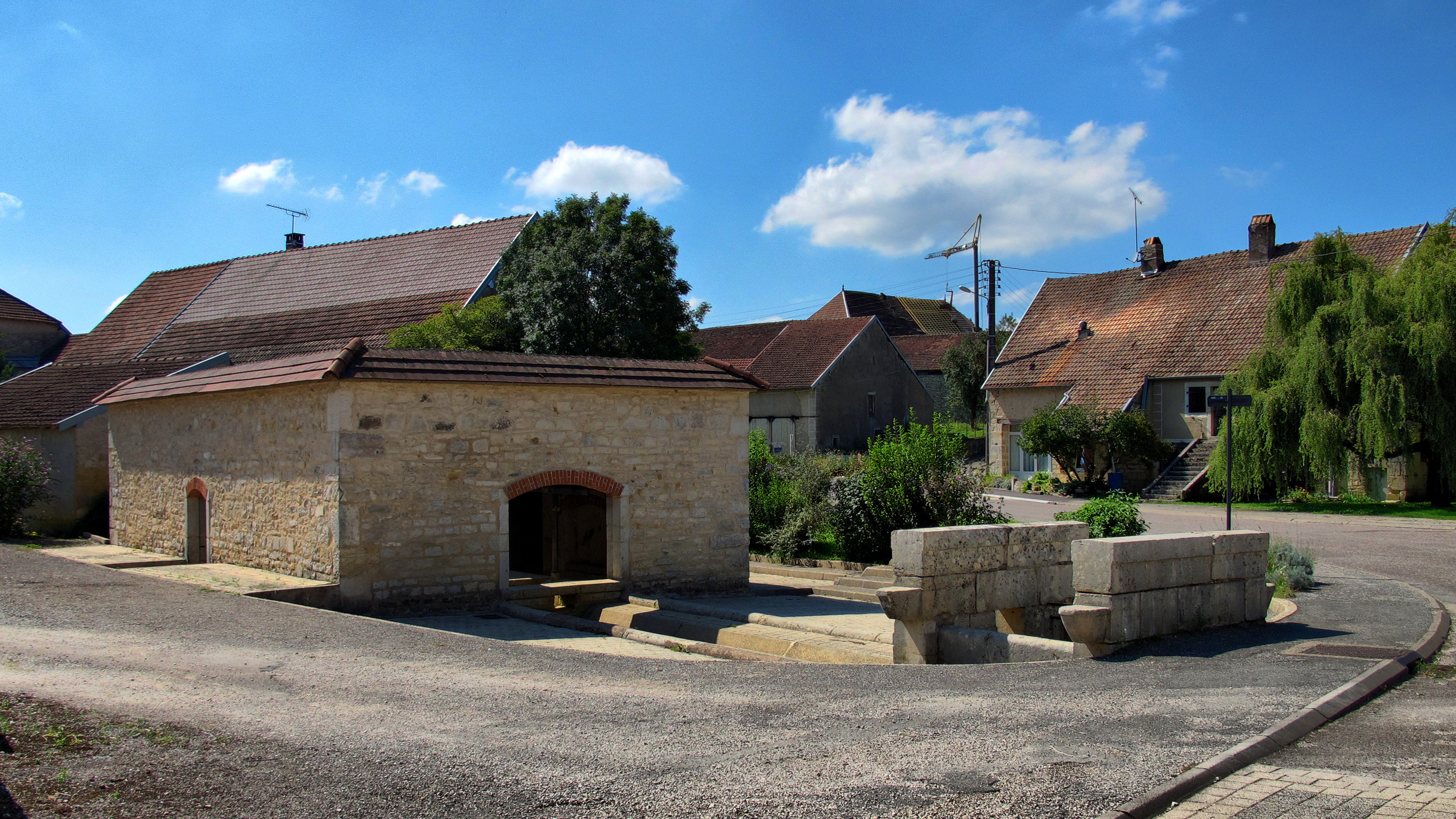
- The wash house in Chancey
- Location of Chancey
- Location within France Location within Bourgogne-Franche-Comté
- Coordinates: 47°19′18″N 5°41′00″E
- Country: France
- Region: Bourgogne-Franche-Comté
- Department: Haute-Saône
- Arrondissement: Vesoul
- Canton: Marnay

Government
  - Mayor (2020–2026): André Gauthier
- Area^{1}: 7.71 km^{2} (2.98 sq mi)
- Highest elevation: 298 m (978 ft)
- Lowest elevation: 224 m (735 ft)
- Population (2023): 206
  - Density: 26.7/km^{2} (69.2/sq mi)
- Time zone: UTC+01:00 (CET)
  - Summer (DST): UTC+02:00 (CEST)
- INSEE/Postal code: 70126 /70140
- ^{1} French Land Register data, which excludes lakes, ponds, glaciers > 1 km^{2} (0.386 sq mi or 247 acres) and river estuaries.

Chancey (French pronunciation: [ʃɑ̃sɛ]) is a commune in the Haute-Saône department in the region of Bourgogne-Franche-Comté in eastern France.

== See also ==
- Communes of the Haute-Saône department
