= Hugier =

- Commune
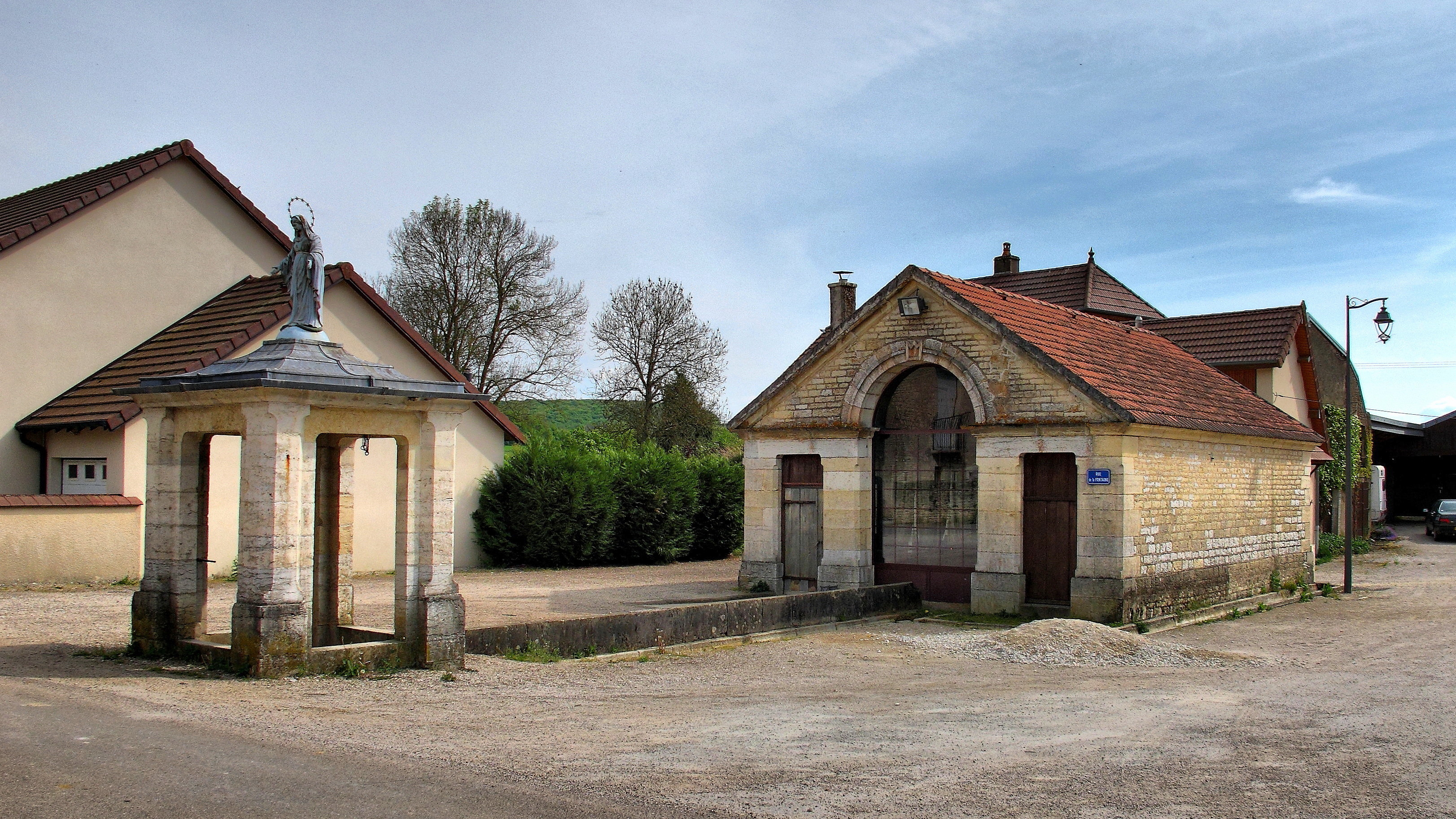
- The wash house in Hugier
- Location of Hugier
- Location within France Location within Bourgogne-Franche-Comté
- Coordinates: 47°18′55″N 5°42′34″E
- Country: France
- Region: Bourgogne-Franche-Comté
- Department: Haute-Saône
- Arrondissement: Vesoul
- Canton: Marnay

Government
  - Mayor (2020–2026): Marie-Claire Faivre-Lacour
- Area^{1}: 7.08 km^{2} (2.73 sq mi)
- Highest elevation: 302 m (991 ft)
- Lowest elevation: 217 m (712 ft)
- Population (2023): 115
  - Density: 16.2/km^{2} (42.1/sq mi)
- Time zone: UTC+01:00 (CET)
  - Summer (DST): UTC+02:00 (CEST)
- INSEE/Postal code: 70286 /70150
- ^{1} French Land Register data, which excludes lakes, ponds, glaciers > 1 km^{2} (0.386 sq mi or 247 acres) and river estuaries.

Hugier (French pronunciation: [yʒje]) is a commune in the Haute-Saône department in the region of Bourgogne-Franche-Comté in eastern France.

== See also ==
- Communes of the Haute-Saône department
