= Lieucourt =

- Commune
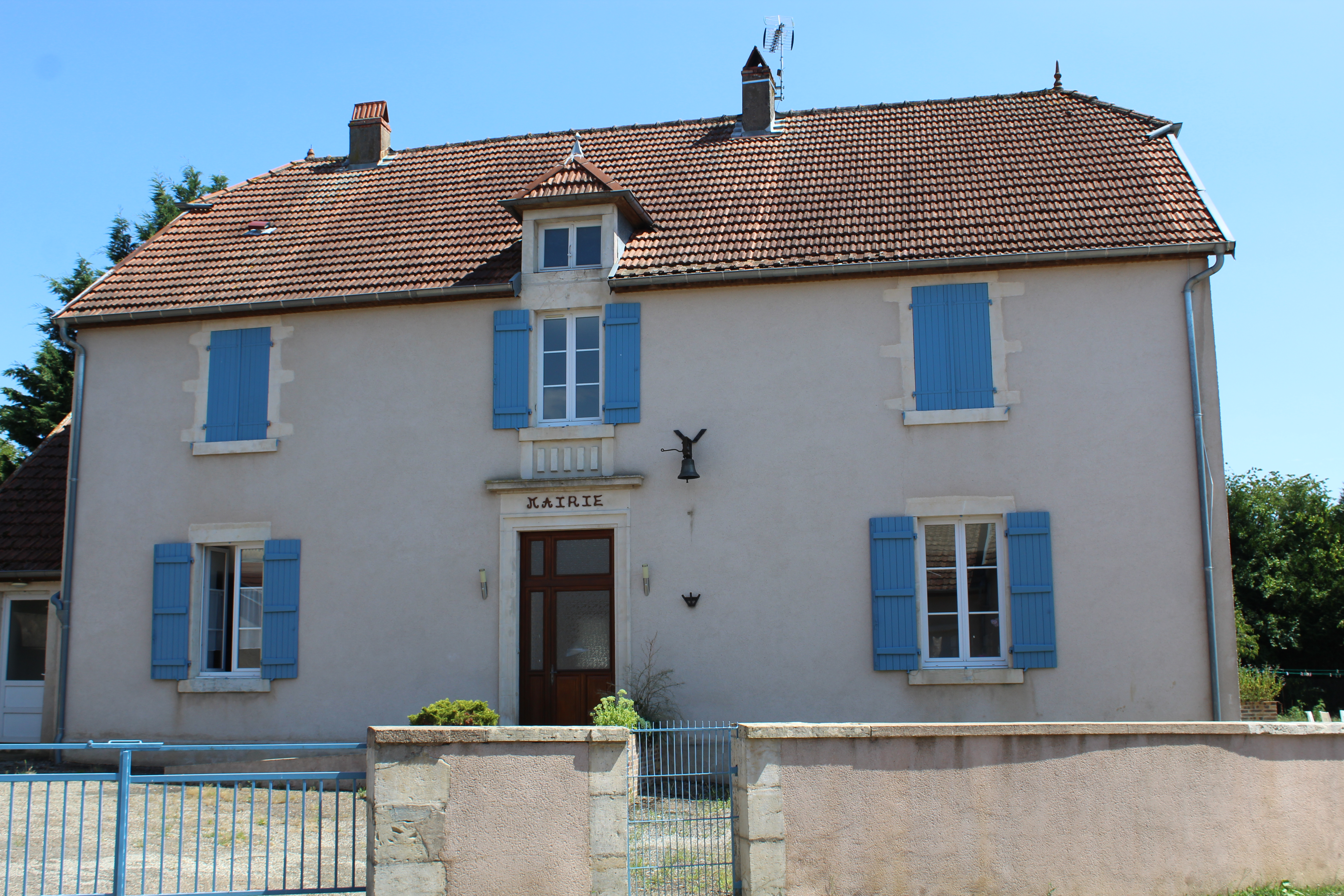
- The town hall in Lieucourt
- Location of Lieucourt
- Location within France Location within Bourgogne-Franche-Comté
- Coordinates: 47°21′07″N 5°37′28″E
- Country: France
- Region: Bourgogne-Franche-Comté
- Department: Haute-Saône
- Arrondissement: Vesoul
- Canton: Marnay
- Area^{1}: 4.80 km^{2} (1.85 sq mi)
- Highest elevation: 248 m (814 ft)
- Lowest elevation: 204 m (669 ft)
- Population (2023): 71
  - Density: 15/km^{2} (38/sq mi)
- Time zone: UTC+01:00 (CET)
  - Summer (DST): UTC+02:00 (CEST)
- INSEE/Postal code: 70302 /70140
- ^{1} French Land Register data, which excludes lakes, ponds, glaciers > 1 km^{2} (0.386 sq mi or 247 acres) and river estuaries.

Lieucourt is a commune in the Haute-Saône department in the region of Bourgogne-Franche-Comté in eastern France.

== See also ==
- Communes of the Haute-Saône department
