= Brussey =

- Commune
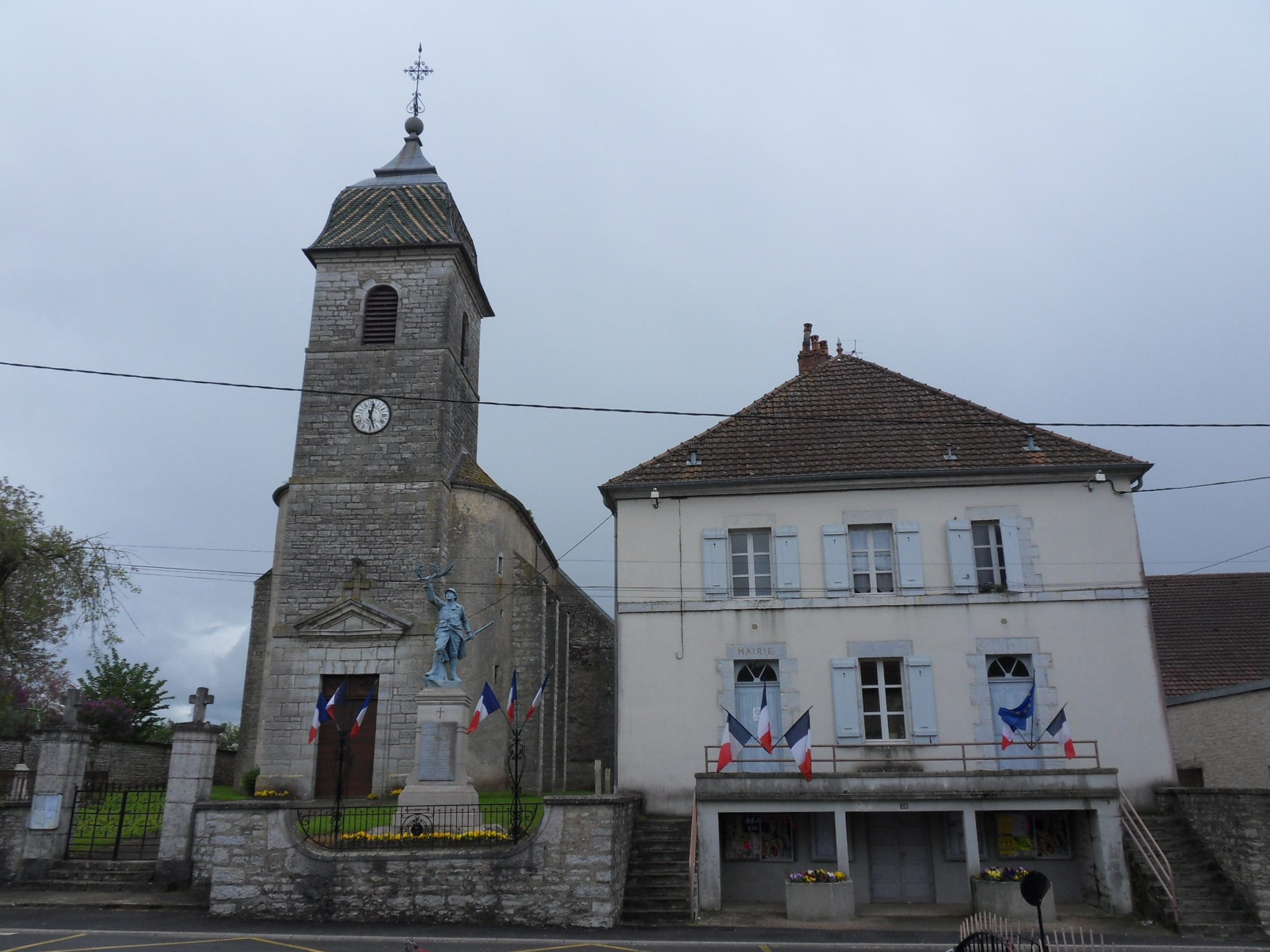
- The town hall in Brussey
- Location of Brussey
- Location within France Location within Bourgogne-Franche-Comté
- Coordinates: 47°18′04″N 5°48′40″E
- Country: France
- Region: Bourgogne-Franche-Comté
- Department: Haute-Saône
- Arrondissement: Vesoul
- Canton: Marnay

Government
  - Mayor (2020–2026): Claude Renaudot
- Area^{1}: 7.27 km^{2} (2.81 sq mi)
- Highest elevation: 336 m (1,102 ft)
- Lowest elevation: 200 m (660 ft)
- Population (2023): 296
  - Density: 40.7/km^{2} (105/sq mi)
- Time zone: UTC+01:00 (CET)
  - Summer (DST): UTC+02:00 (CEST)
- INSEE/Postal code: 70102 /70150
- ^{1} French Land Register data, which excludes lakes, ponds, glaciers > 1 km^{2} (0.386 sq mi or 247 acres) and river estuaries.

Brussey (French pronunciation: [bʁysɛ]) is a commune in the Haute-Saône department in the region of Bourgogne-Franche-Comté in eastern France.

== See also ==
- Communes of the Haute-Saône department
