= Charcenne =

- Commune
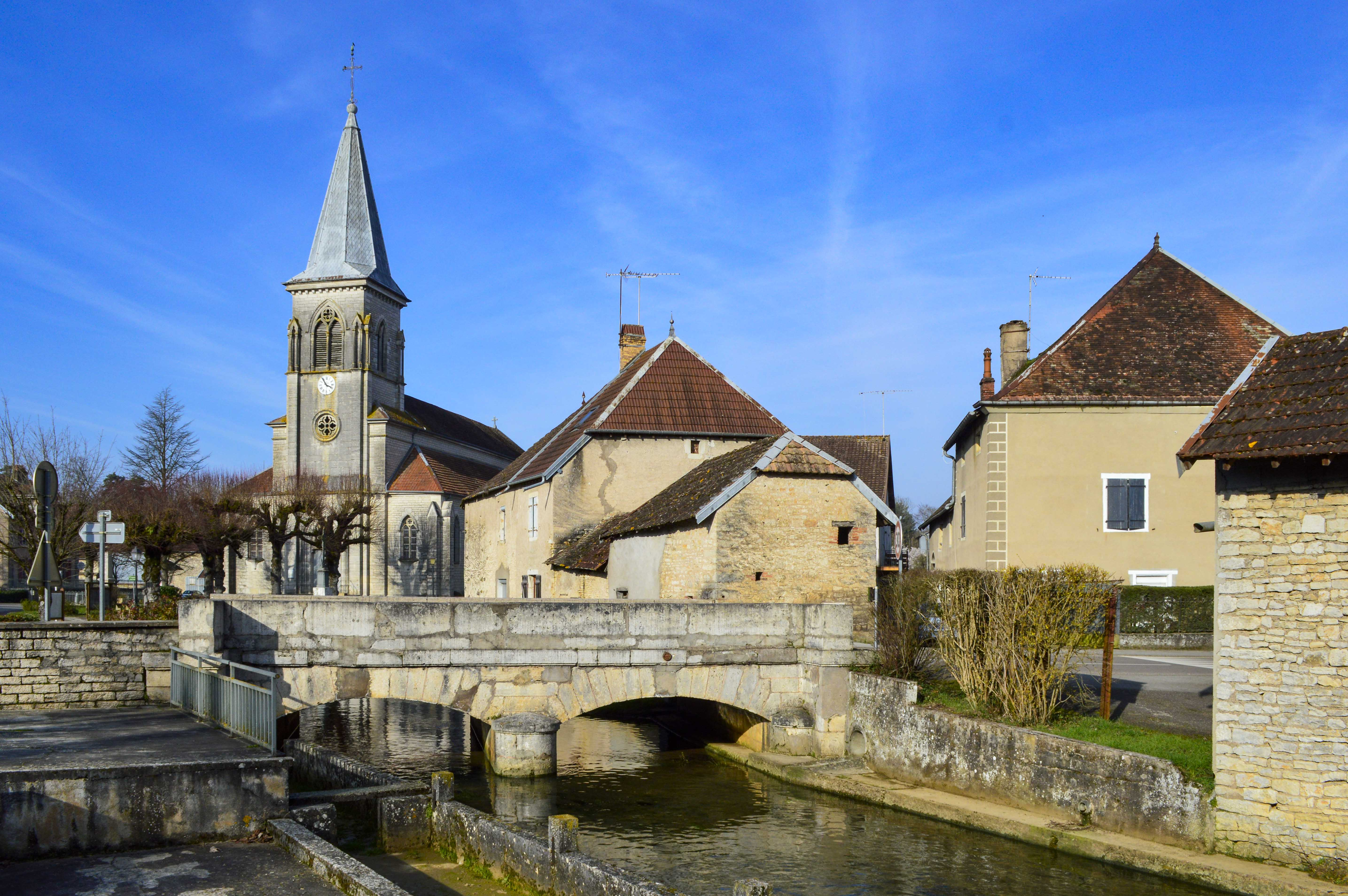
- A general view of Charcenne

- Coat of arms
- Location of Charcenne
- Location within France Location within Bourgogne-Franche-Comté
- Coordinates: 47°22′21″N 5°46′38″E
- Country: France
- Region: Bourgogne-Franche-Comté
- Department: Haute-Saône
- Arrondissement: Vesoul
- Canton: Marnay
- Intercommunality: Communauté de communes des Monts de Gy

Government
  - Mayor (2020–2026): Michel Renevier
- Area^{1}: 7.16 km^{2} (2.76 sq mi)
- Highest elevation: 351 m (1,152 ft)
- Lowest elevation: 214 m (702 ft)
- Population (2023): 295
  - Density: 41.2/km^{2} (107/sq mi)
- Time zone: UTC+01:00 (CET)
  - Summer (DST): UTC+02:00 (CEST)
- INSEE/Postal code: 70130 /70700
- ^{1} French Land Register data, which excludes lakes, ponds, glaciers > 1 km^{2} (0.386 sq mi or 247 acres) and river estuaries.

Charcenne (French pronunciation: [ʃaʁsɛn]) is a commune in the Haute-Saône department in the region of Bourgogne-Franche-Comté in eastern France.

== See also ==
- Communes of the Haute-Saône department
