= Cugney =

- Commune
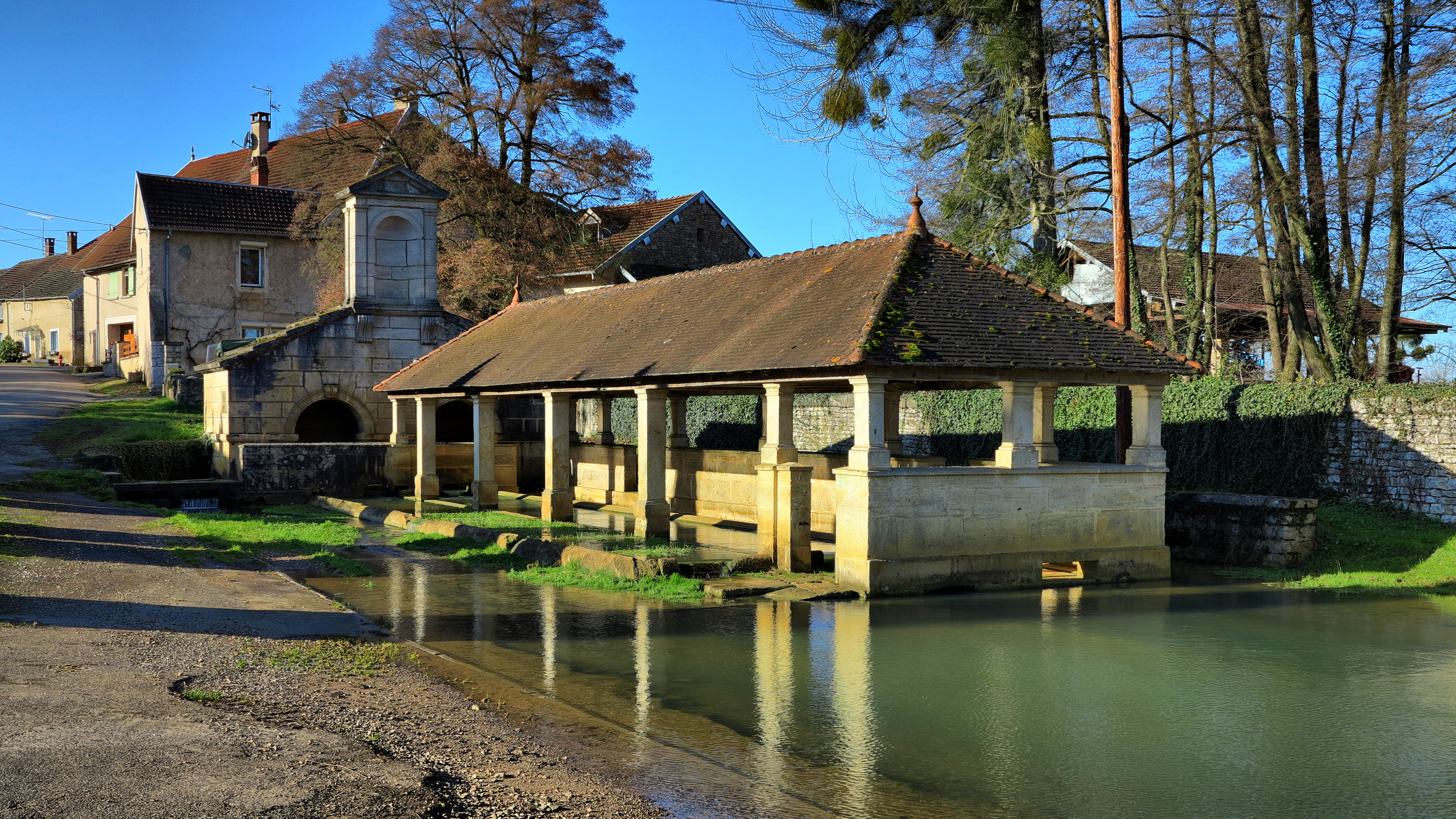
- The wash house in Cugney
- Location of Cugney
- Location within France Location within Bourgogne-Franche-Comté
- Coordinates: 47°21′58″N 5°43′11″E
- Country: France
- Region: Bourgogne-Franche-Comté
- Department: Haute-Saône
- Arrondissement: Vesoul
- Canton: Marnay

Government
  - Mayor (2020–2026): Jean-Pierre Braichotte
- Area^{1}: 11.39 km^{2} (4.40 sq mi)
- Highest elevation: 315 m (1,033 ft)
- Lowest elevation: 221 m (725 ft)
- Population (2023): 208
  - Density: 18.3/km^{2} (47.3/sq mi)
- Time zone: UTC+01:00 (CET)
  - Summer (DST): UTC+02:00 (CEST)
- INSEE/Postal code: 70192 /70700
- ^{1} French Land Register data, which excludes lakes, ponds, glaciers > 1 km^{2} (0.386 sq mi or 247 acres) and river estuaries.

Cugney (French pronunciation: [kyɲɛ]) is a commune in the Haute-Saône department in the region of Bourgogne-Franche-Comté in eastern France.

== See also ==
- Communes of the Haute-Saône department
