= Sornay, Haute-Saône =

Sornay
- Commune
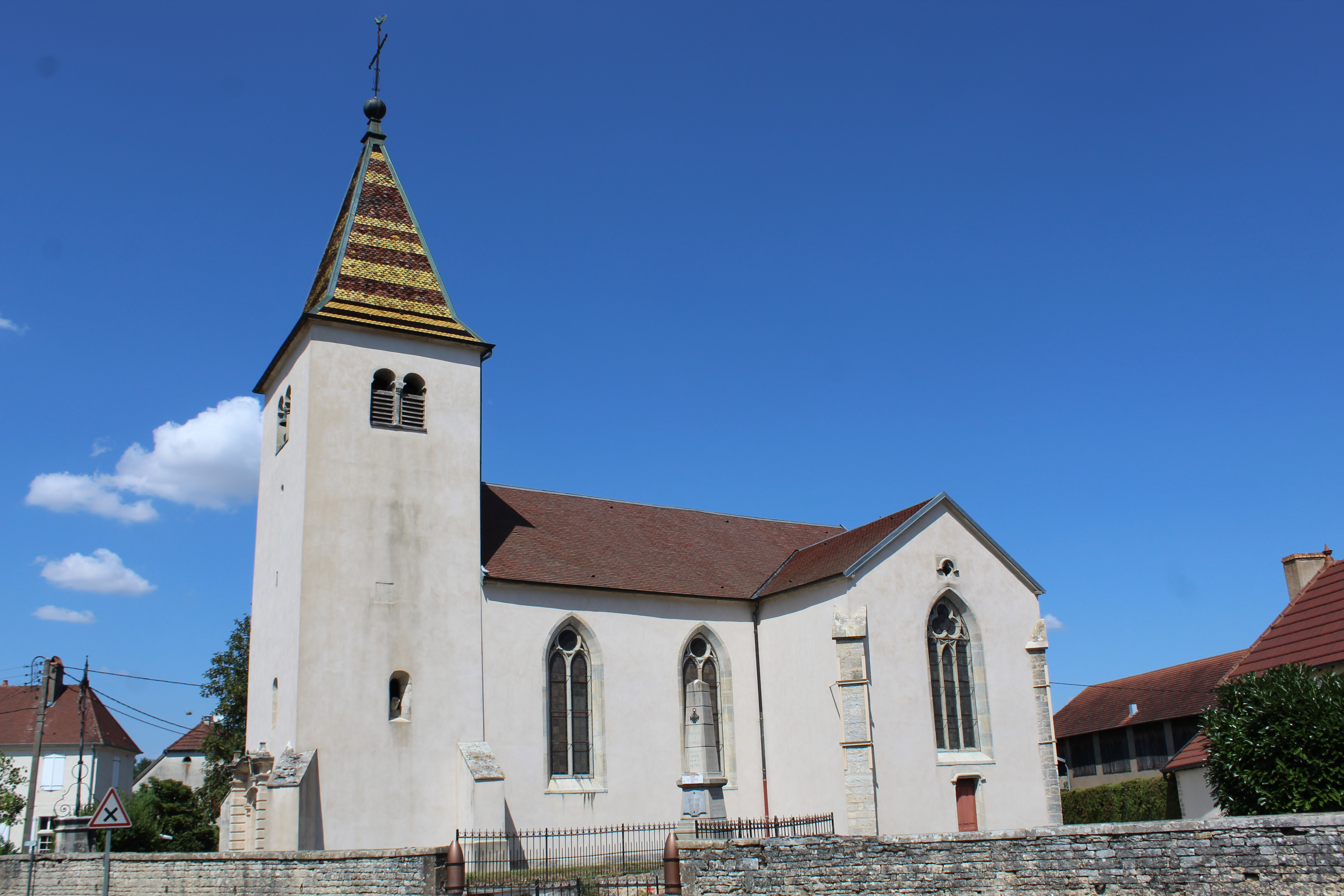
- The church in Sornay
- Location of Sornay
- Location within France Location within Bourgogne-Franche-Comté
- Coordinates: 47°16′44″N 5°41′55″E
- Country: France
- Region: Bourgogne-Franche-Comté
- Department: Haute-Saône
- Arrondissement: Vesoul
- Canton: Marnay

Government
  - Mayor (2020–2026): François Marchal
- Area^{1}: 6.29 km^{2} (2.43 sq mi)
- Highest elevation: 275 m (902 ft)
- Lowest elevation: 197 m (646 ft)
- Population (2023): 357
  - Density: 56.8/km^{2} (147/sq mi)
- Time zone: UTC+01:00 (CET)
  - Summer (DST): UTC+02:00 (CEST)
- INSEE/Postal code: 70494 /70150
- ^{1} French Land Register data, which excludes lakes, ponds, glaciers > 1 km^{2} (0.386 sq mi or 247 acres) and river estuaries.

Sornay (French pronunciation: [sɔʁnɛ]) is a commune in the Haute-Saône department in the region of Bourgogne-Franche-Comté in eastern France.

== See also ==
- Communes of the Haute-Saône department
