= Bonnevent-Velloreille =

- Commune
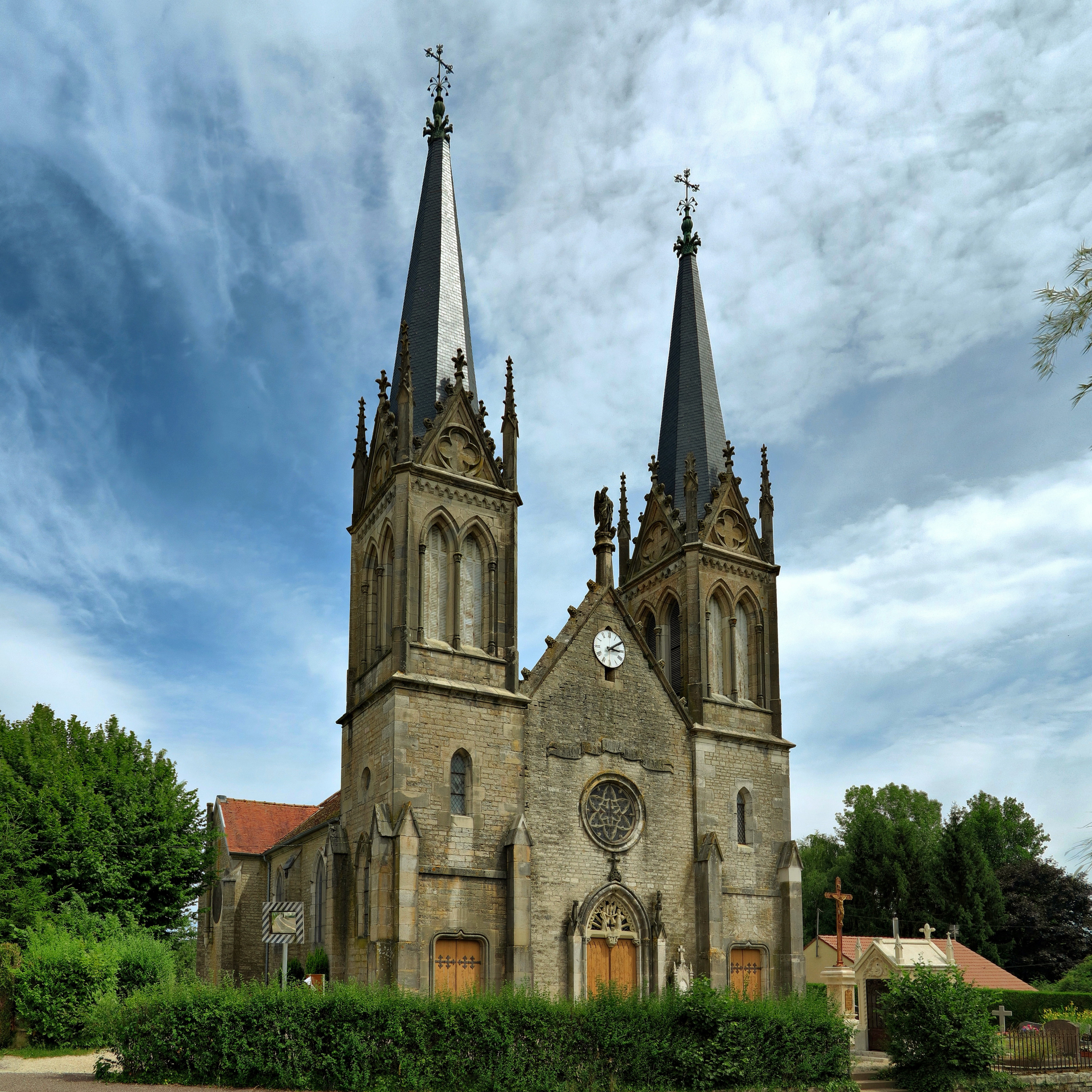
- The church in Bonnevent-Velloreille

- Coat of arms
- Location of Bonnevent-Velloreille
- Location within France Location within Bourgogne-Franche-Comté
- Coordinates: 47°23′36″N 5°56′02″E
- Country: France
- Region: Bourgogne-Franche-Comté
- Department: Haute-Saône
- Arrondissement: Vesoul
- Canton: Marnay

Government
  - Mayor (2020–2026): Josiane Cardinal
- Area^{1}: 5.32 km^{2} (2.05 sq mi)
- Highest elevation: 355 m (1,165 ft)
- Lowest elevation: 230 m (750 ft)
- Population (2023): 425
  - Density: 79.9/km^{2} (207/sq mi)
- Time zone: UTC+01:00 (CET)
  - Summer (DST): UTC+02:00 (CEST)
- INSEE/Postal code: 70076 /70700
- ^{1} French Land Register data, which excludes lakes, ponds, glaciers > 1 km^{2} (0.386 sq mi or 247 acres) and river estuaries.

Bonnevent-Velloreille (French pronunciation: [bɔnvɑ̃ vɛlɔʁɛj], before 1962: Bonnevent-et-Velloreille-lès-Bonnevent) is a commune in the Haute-Saône department in the region of Bourgogne-Franche-Comté in eastern France.

== See also ==
- Communes of the Haute-Saône department
