= Citey =

- Commune
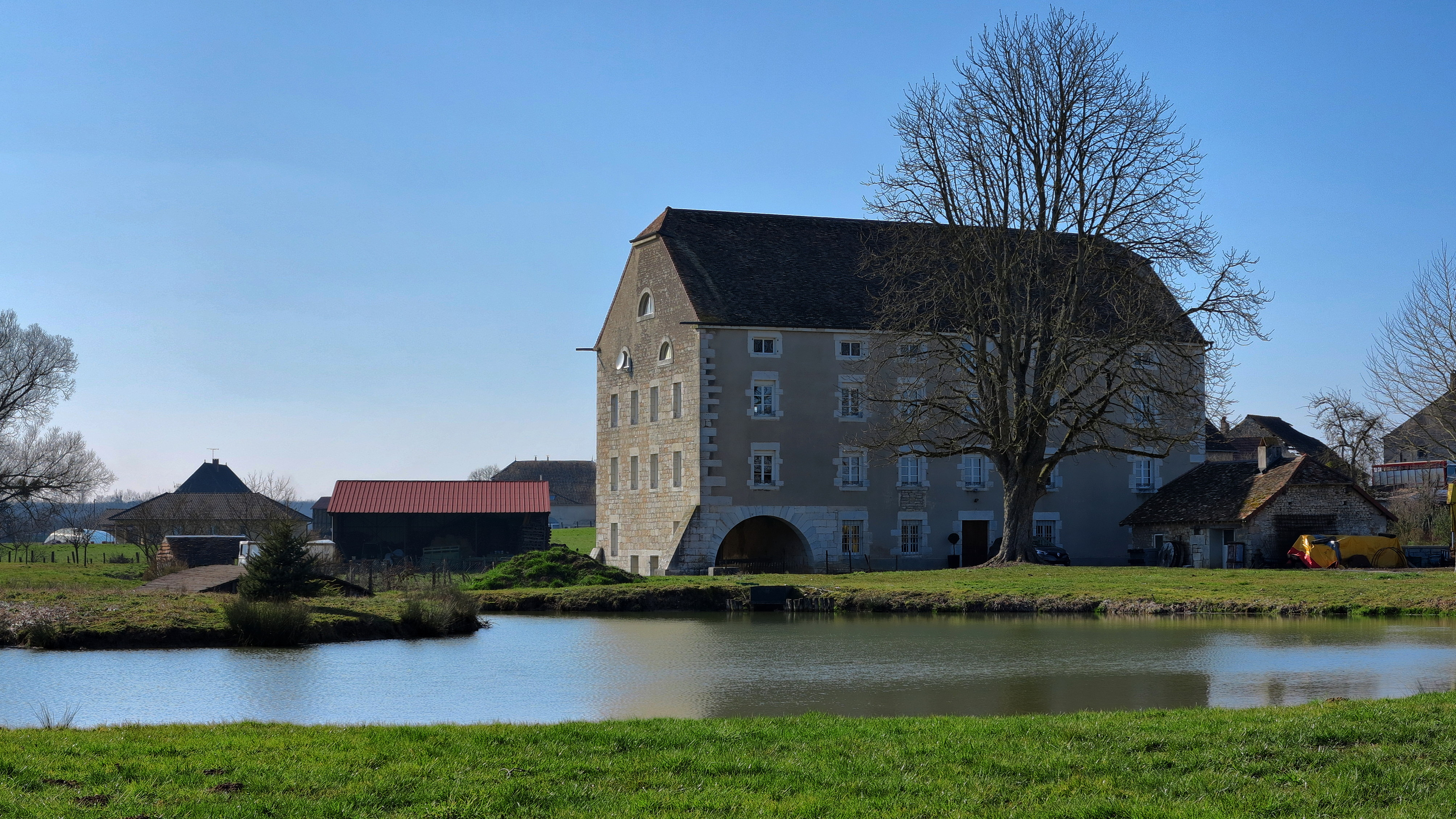
- The mill in Citey
- Location of Citey
- Location within France Location within Bourgogne-Franche-Comté
- Coordinates: 47°25′51″N 5°47′25″E
- Country: France
- Region: Bourgogne-Franche-Comté
- Department: Haute-Saône
- Arrondissement: Vesoul
- Canton: Marnay

Government
  - Mayor (2020–2026): Jean-Luc Mairet
- Area^{1}: 5.76 km^{2} (2.22 sq mi)
- Highest elevation: 257 m (843 ft)
- Lowest elevation: 198 m (650 ft)
- Population (2023): 100
  - Density: 17/km^{2} (45/sq mi)
- Time zone: UTC+01:00 (CET)
  - Summer (DST): UTC+02:00 (CEST)
- INSEE/Postal code: 70156 /70700
- ^{1} French Land Register data, which excludes lakes, ponds, glaciers > 1 km^{2} (0.386 sq mi or 247 acres) and river estuaries.

Citey (French pronunciation: [sitɛ]) is a commune in the Haute-Saône department in the region of Bourgogne-Franche-Comté in eastern France.

== See also ==
- Communes of the Haute-Saône department
