= Vadans, Haute-Saône =

Vadans
- Commune
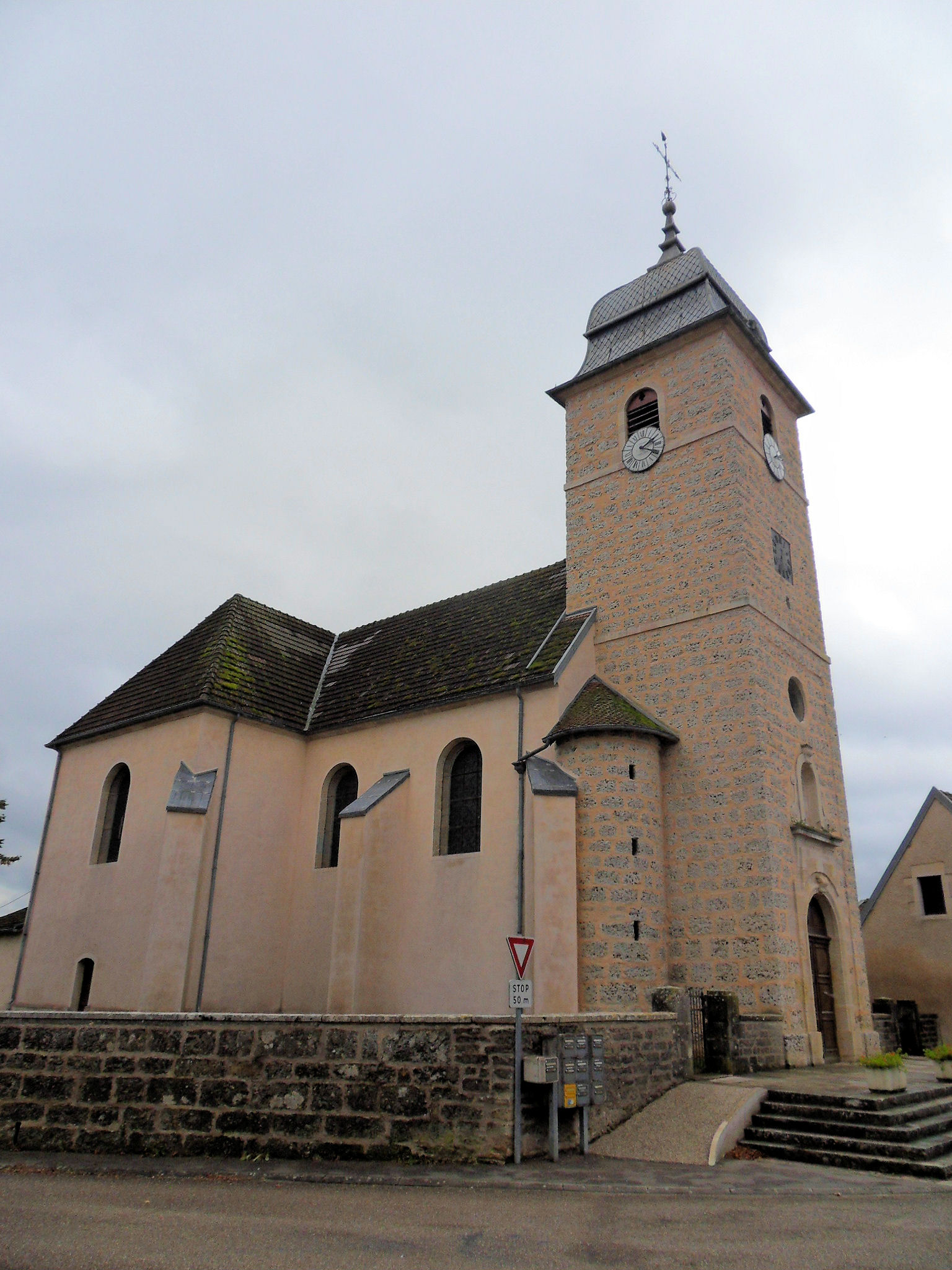
- The church in Vadans

- Coat of arms
- Location of Vadans
- Location within France Location within Bourgogne-Franche-Comté
- Coordinates: 47°20′55″N 5°35′16″E
- Country: France
- Region: Bourgogne-Franche-Comté
- Department: Haute-Saône
- Arrondissement: Vesoul
- Canton: Marnay

Government
  - Mayor (2020–2026): Richard Rousselle
- Area^{1}: 12.95 km^{2} (5.00 sq mi)
- Highest elevation: 243 m (797 ft)
- Lowest elevation: 193 m (633 ft)
- Population (2023): 138
  - Density: 10.7/km^{2} (27.6/sq mi)
- Time zone: UTC+01:00 (CET)
  - Summer (DST): UTC+02:00 (CEST)
- INSEE/Postal code: 70510 /70140
- ^{1} French Land Register data, which excludes lakes, ponds, glaciers > 1 km^{2} (0.386 sq mi or 247 acres) and river estuaries.

Vadans (French pronunciation: [vadɑ̃]) is a commune in the Haute-Saône department in the region of Bourgogne-Franche-Comté in eastern France.

== See also ==
- Communes of the Haute-Saône department
