= Malans, Haute-Saône =

Malans
- Commune
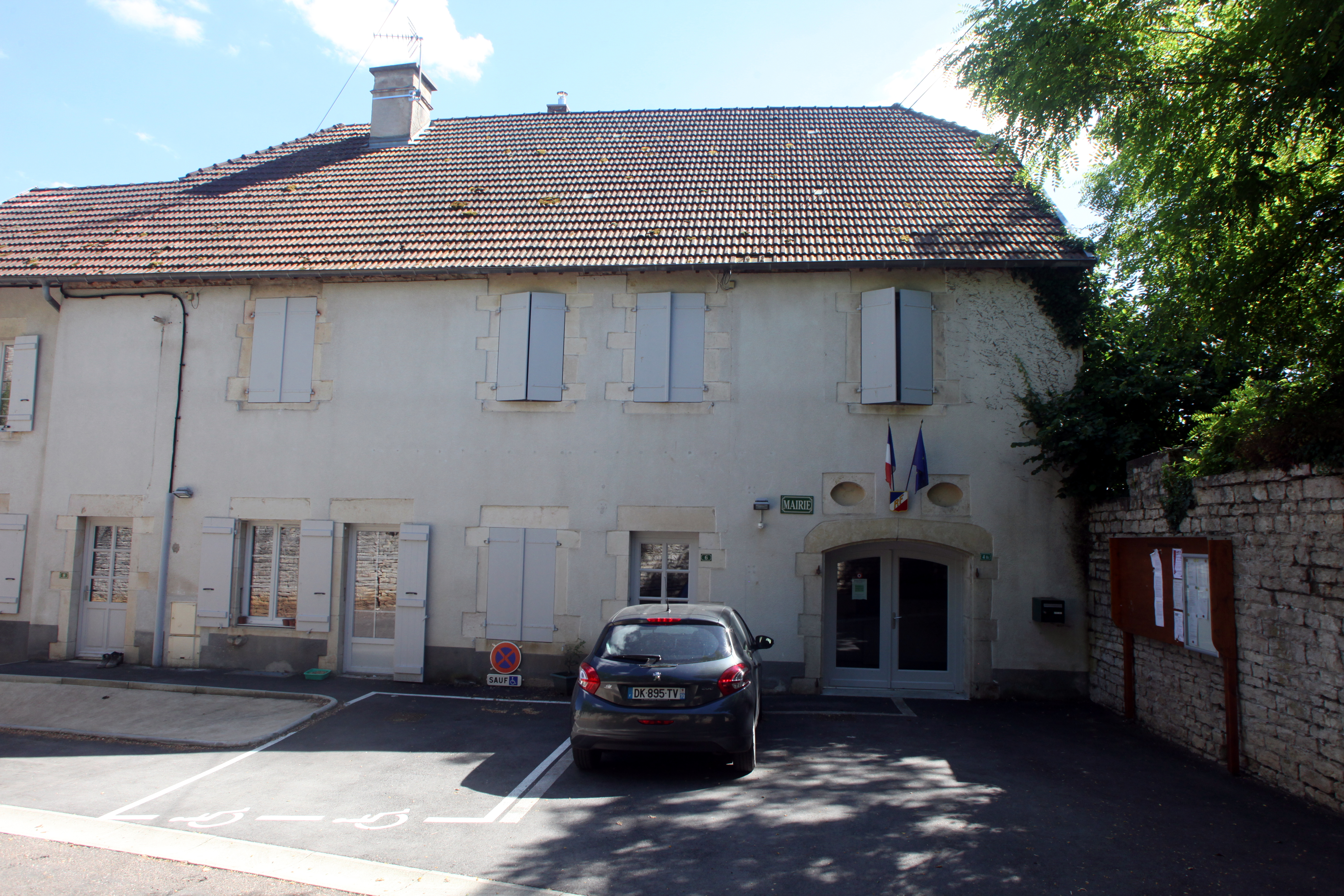
- The town hall in Malans
- Location of Malans
- Location within France Location within Bourgogne-Franche-Comté
- Coordinates: 47°15′51″N 5°35′41″E
- Country: France
- Region: Bourgogne-Franche-Comté
- Department: Haute-Saône
- Arrondissement: Vesoul
- Canton: Marnay

Government
  - Mayor (2020–2026): Michel Gaugry
- Area^{1}: 6.75 km^{2} (2.61 sq mi)
- Highest elevation: 280 m (920 ft)
- Lowest elevation: 190 m (620 ft)
- Population (2023): 135
  - Density: 20.0/km^{2} (51.8/sq mi)
- Time zone: UTC+01:00 (CET)
  - Summer (DST): UTC+02:00 (CEST)
- INSEE/Postal code: 70327 /70140
- ^{1} French Land Register data, which excludes lakes, ponds, glaciers > 1 km^{2} (0.386 sq mi or 247 acres) and river estuaries.

Malans (French pronunciation: [malɑ̃]) is a commune in the Haute-Saône department in the region of Bourgogne-Franche-Comté in eastern France.

== See also ==
- Communes of the Haute-Saône department
