= Completer =

Variety of grape

- Grape (Vitis)
- Color of berry skin: Blanc
- Species: Vitis vinifera
- Also called: Malanstraube and other synonyms
- Origin: Switzerland
- VIVC number: 7160

Completer or Malanstraube is a white Swiss wine grape variety grown primarily in eastern Switzerland around Graubünden. The Completer vine was once domesticated but has now become mostly feral though some Swiss winemakers will make limited quantities of wine harvested from the wild vines. Wine produced from Completer tends to be very full bodied and aromatic.

== Lafnetscha ==
According to wine expert Jancis Robinson, some ampelographers speculate that the Lafnetscha grape grown in the Valais region in southwest Switzerland is actually Completer of which Lafnetscha is a known synonym.

== Synonyms ==
Completer is also known under the synonyms Lafnaetscha, Lafnetscha, Lafnetsela, Lindauer, Malans, Malanstraube, Malanstraube Weisse, Räuschling Edelweiss, Zürichersee, Zürichseer, Zürirebe, and Zurichersee.
