= Échenoz =

Échenoz may refer to:

- Échenoz-le-Sec, commune in the Haute-Saône department in the region of Franche-Comté in eastern France
- Échenoz-la-Méline, commune in the Haute-Saône department in the region of Franche-Comté in eastern France
- Jean Echenoz (born 1947), French writer
- Jérôme Echenoz, French DJ and music producer of electronic music and hip hop also known as Tacteel.
