= Canton of Vesoul-2 =

Coordinates: 47.62°N 6.17°E

Vesoul-2
- Canton
- Interactive map of Vesoul-2
- Country: France
- Region: Bourgogne-Franche-Comté
- Department: Haute-Saône
- No. of communes: {{{nbcomm}}}
- Population (2023): 16,026
- INSEE code: 70 16

The Canton of Vesoul-2 (before March 2015: Vesoul-Est) is a French administrative division, in the arrondissement of Vesoul, in Haute-Saône département (Bourgogne-Franche-Comté région). It consists of the eastern part of the commune of Vesoul and its eastern suburbs. It has 16,072 inhabitants as of 2017.

== Composition ==
The canton of Vesoul-2 is composed of 13 communes:

- Colombier
- Comberjon
- Coulevon
- Frotey-lès-Vesoul
- Montcey
- Navenne
- Quincey
- Varogne
- Vellefrie
- Vesoul (partly)
- La Villeneuve-Bellenoye-et-la-Maize
- Villeparois
- Vilory

== See also ==
- Cantons of the Haute-Saône department
- Communes of the Haute-Saône department
