= Canton of Vesoul-1 =

Coordinates: 47.6231°N 6.1558°E

Vesoul-1
- Canton
- Interactive map of Vesoul-1
- Country: France
- Region: Bourgogne-Franche-Comté
- Department: Haute-Saône
- No. of communes: {{{nbcomm}}}

Government
  - Representatives (2021–2028): Sylvie Manière; Thomas Oudot
- Population (2023): 16,479
- INSEE code: 70 15

The Canton of Vesoul-1 (before March 2015: Vesoul-Ouest) is a French administrative division, in the arrondissement of Vesoul, in Haute-Saône département (Bourgogne-Franche-Comté région). It consists of the western part of the commune of Vesoul and its western suburbs. It has 16,618 inhabitants as of 2017.

== Composition ==
The canton of Vesoul-1 is composed of 12 communes:

- Andelarre
- Andelarrot
- Chariez
- Charmoille
- Échenoz-la-Méline
- Montigny-lès-Vesoul
- Mont-le-Vernois
- Noidans-lès-Vesoul
- Pusey
- Pusy-et-Épenoux
- Vaivre-et-Montoille
- Vesoul (partly)

== See also ==
- Cantons of the Haute-Saône department
- Communes of the Haute-Saône department
