= Montcey =

- Commune
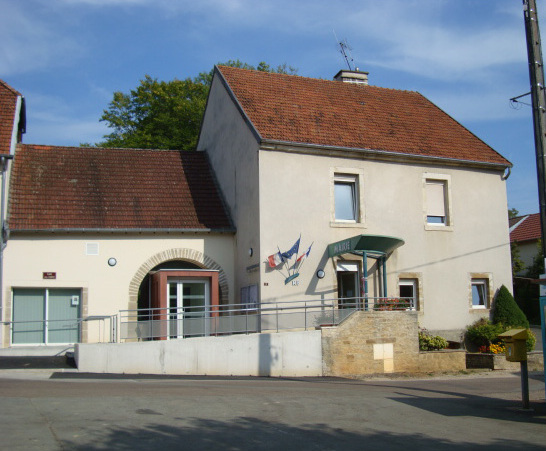
- The town hall in Montcey

- Coat of arms
- Location of Montcey
- Location within France Location within Bourgogne-Franche-Comté
- Coordinates: 47°39′23″N 6°14′14″E
- Country: France
- Region: Bourgogne-Franche-Comté
- Department: Haute-Saône
- Arrondissement: Vesoul
- Canton: Vesoul-2
- Intercommunality: CA Vesoul

Government
  - Mayor (2020–2026): Jacky Jeanmougin
- Area^{1}: 8.12 km^{2} (3.14 sq mi)
- Highest elevation: 400 m (1,300 ft)
- Lowest elevation: 282 m (925 ft)
- Population (2023): 264
  - Density: 32.5/km^{2} (84.2/sq mi)
- Time zone: UTC+01:00 (CET)
  - Summer (DST): UTC+02:00 (CEST)
- INSEE/Postal code: 70358 /70000
- ^{1} French Land Register data, which excludes lakes, ponds, glaciers > 1 km^{2} (0.386 sq mi or 247 acres) and river estuaries.

Montcey (French pronunciation: [mɔ̃sɛ]) is a commune in the Haute-Saône department in the region of Bourgogne-Franche-Comté in eastern France.

The town is located near Vesoul.

== See also ==
- Communes of the Haute-Saône department
- Communauté d'agglomération de Vesoul
- Arrondissement of Vesoul
