= Cantons of the Haute-Saône department =

The following is a list of the 17 cantons of the Haute-Saône department, in France, following the French canton reorganisation which came into effect in March 2015:

- Dampierre-sur-Salon
- Gray
- Héricourt-1
- Héricourt-2
- Jussey
- Lure-1
- Lure-2
- Luxeuil-les-Bains
- Marnay
- Mélisey
- Port-sur-Saône
- Rioz
- Saint-Loup-sur-Semouse
- Scey-sur-Saône-et-Saint-Albin
- Vesoul-1
- Vesoul-2
- Villersexel
