= Vilory =

- Commune
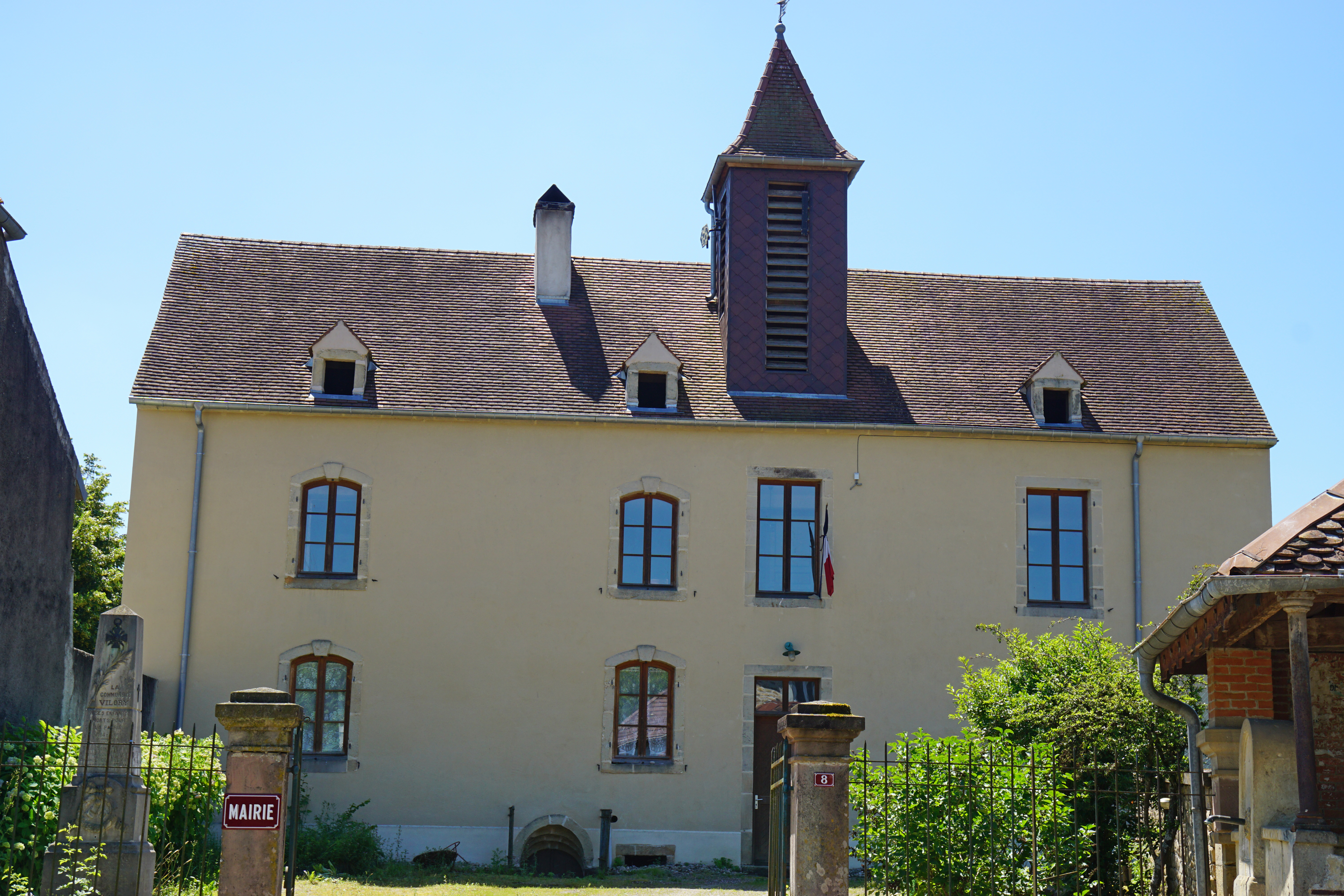
- The town hall in Vilory
- Location of Vilory
- Location within France Location within Bourgogne-Franche-Comté
- Coordinates: 47°43′30″N 6°13′55″E
- Country: France
- Region: Bourgogne-Franche-Comté
- Department: Haute-Saône
- Arrondissement: Vesoul
- Canton: Vesoul-2

Government
  - Mayor (2020–2026): Delphine Villatte
- Area^{1}: 4.15 km^{2} (1.60 sq mi)
- Highest elevation: 395 m (1,296 ft)
- Lowest elevation: 242 m (794 ft)
- Population (2023): 68
  - Density: 16/km^{2} (42/sq mi)
- Time zone: UTC+01:00 (CET)
  - Summer (DST): UTC+02:00 (CEST)
- INSEE/Postal code: 70569 /70240
- ^{1} French Land Register data, which excludes lakes, ponds, glaciers > 1 km^{2} (0.386 sq mi or 247 acres) and river estuaries.

Vilory (French pronunciation: [vilɔʁi]) is a commune in the Haute-Saône department in the region of Bourgogne-Franche-Comté in eastern France.

== See also ==
- Communes of the Haute-Saône department
