= Navenne =

- Commune
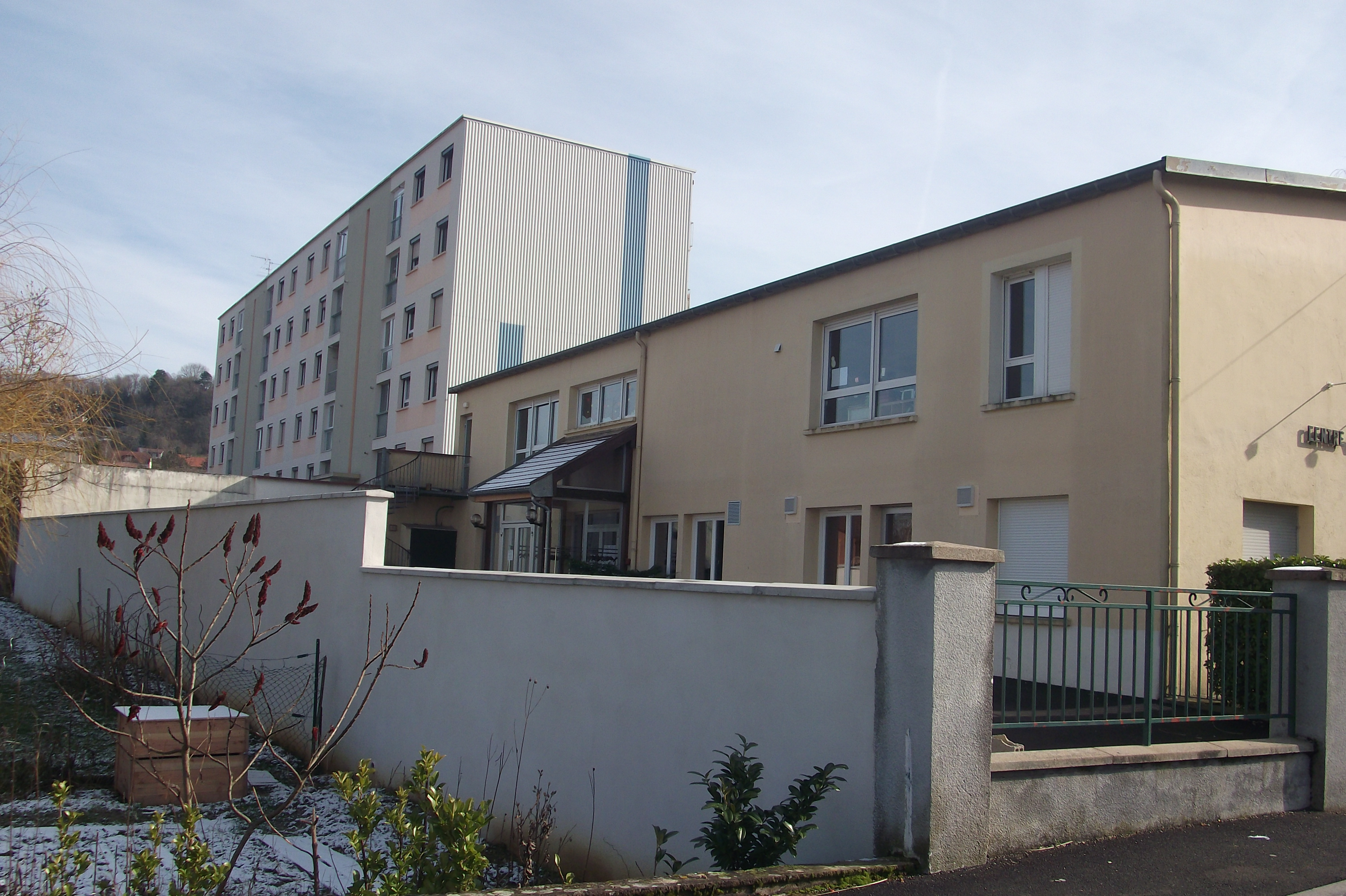
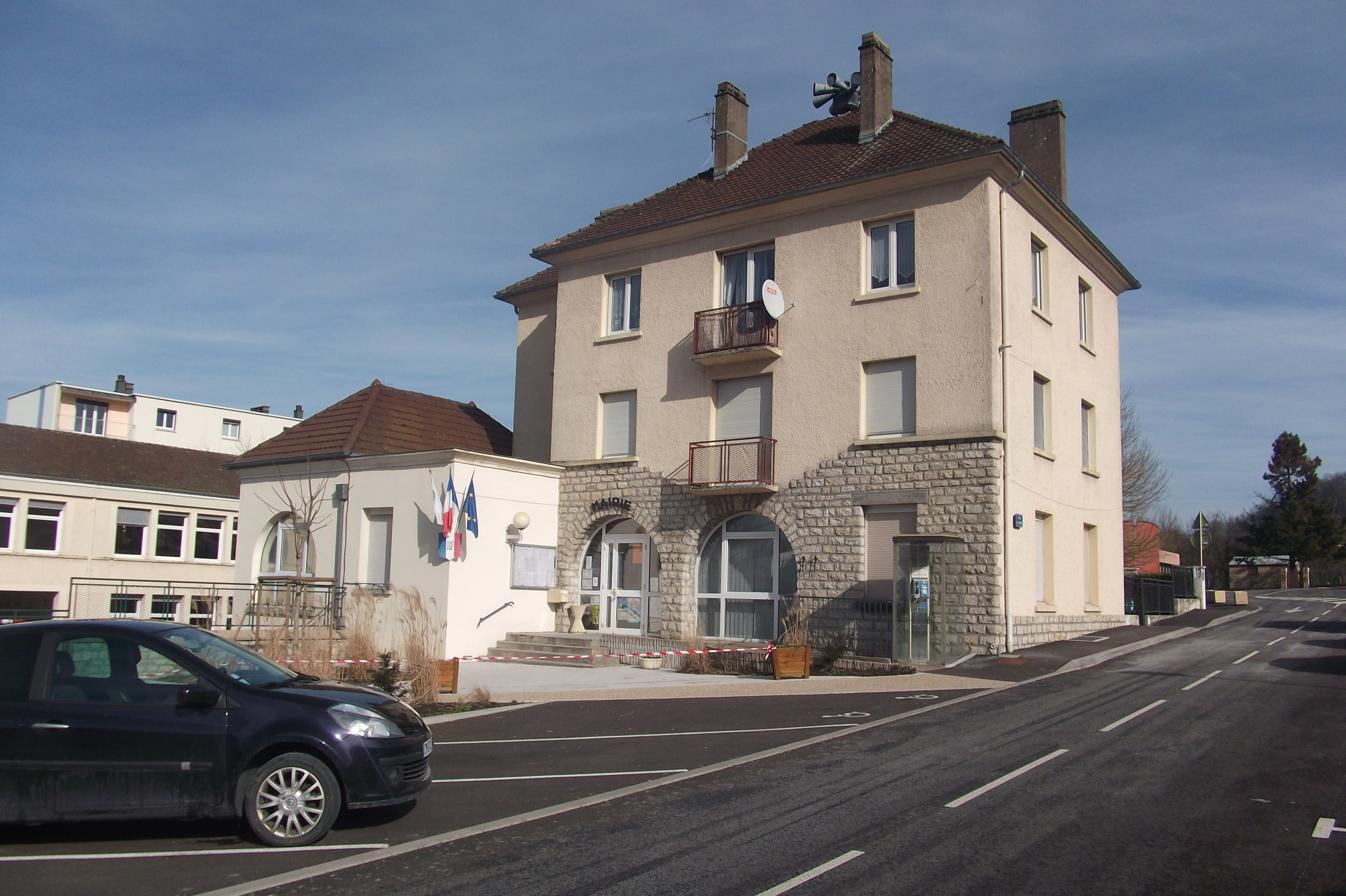
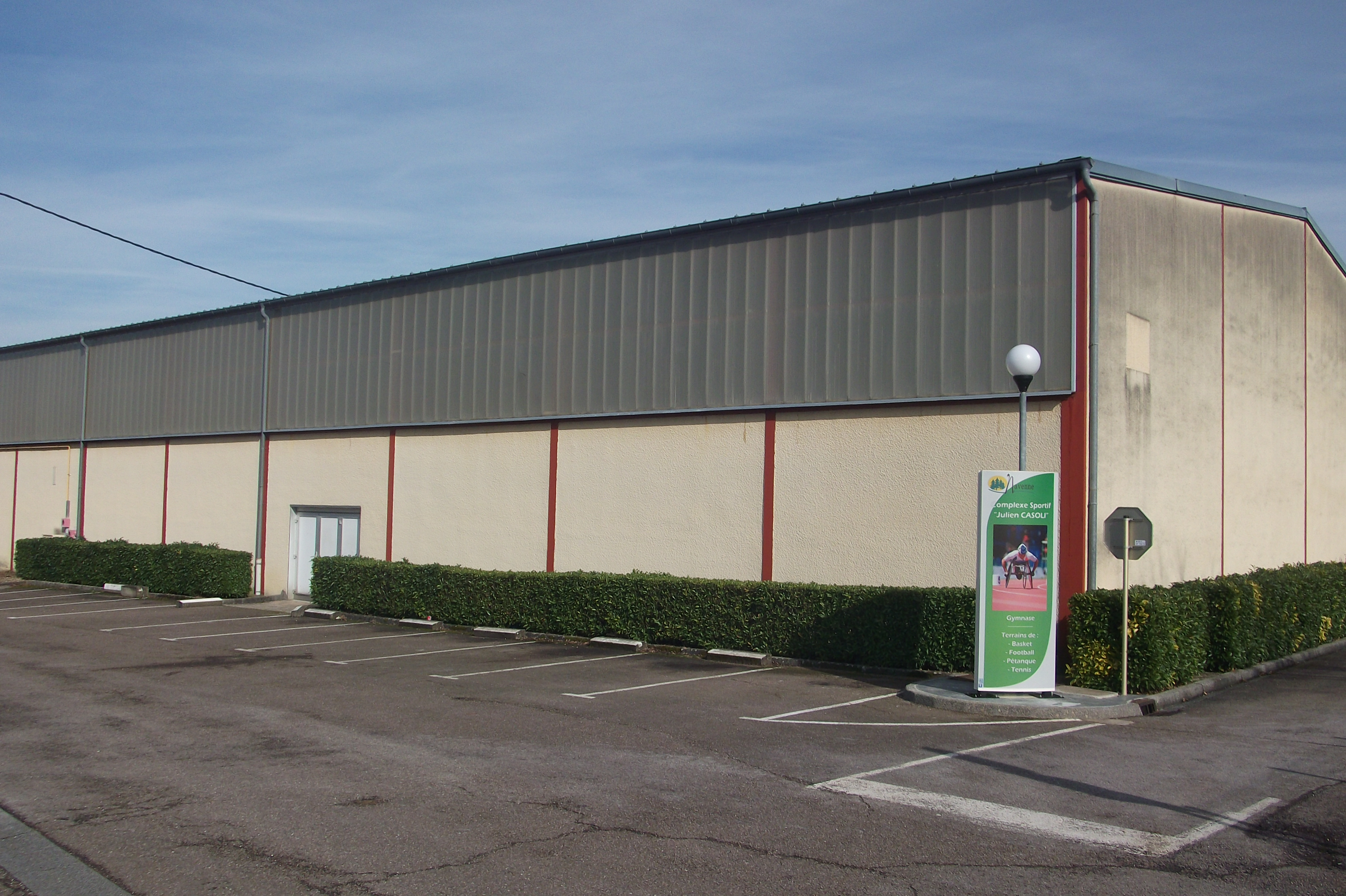
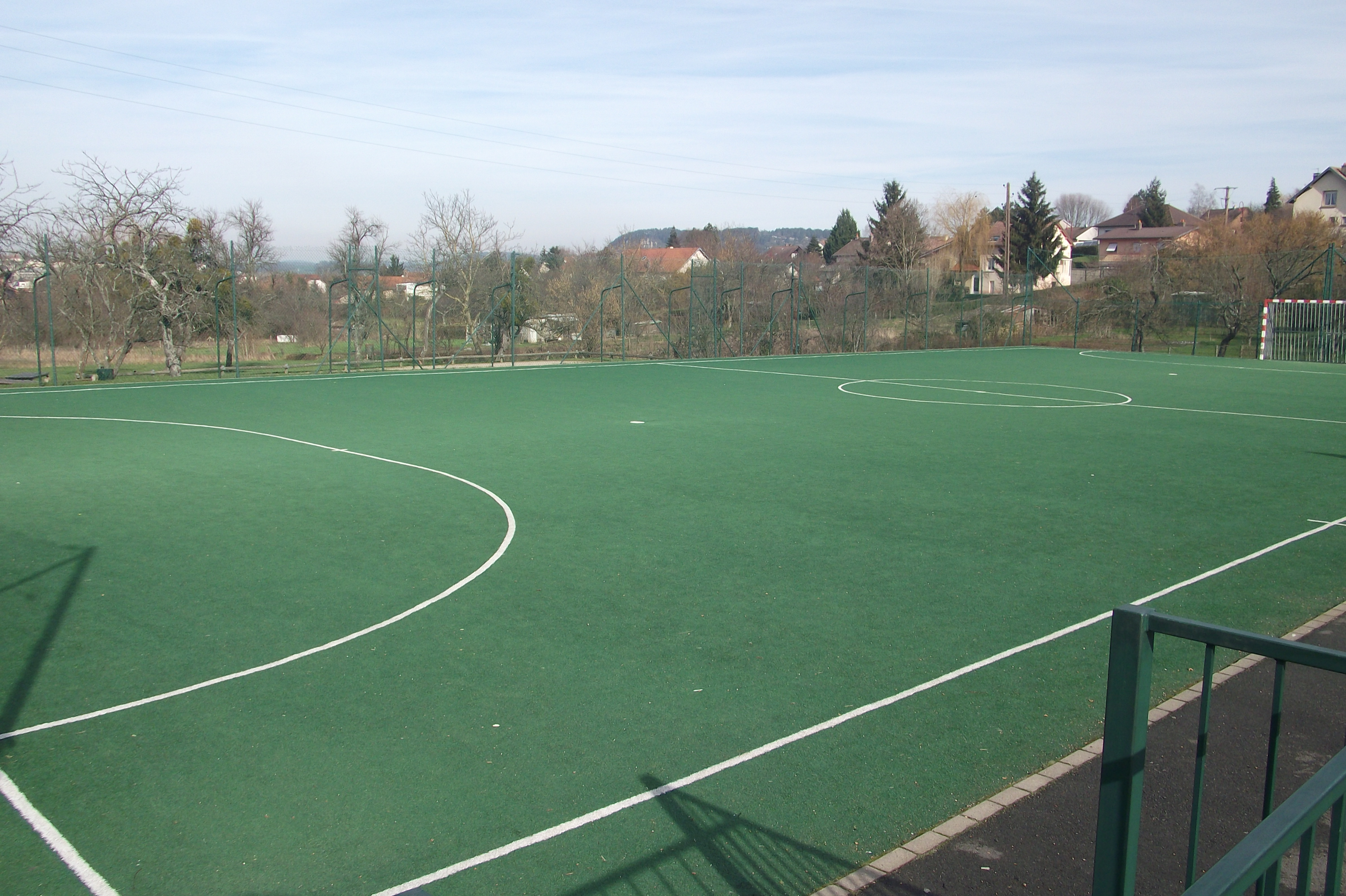
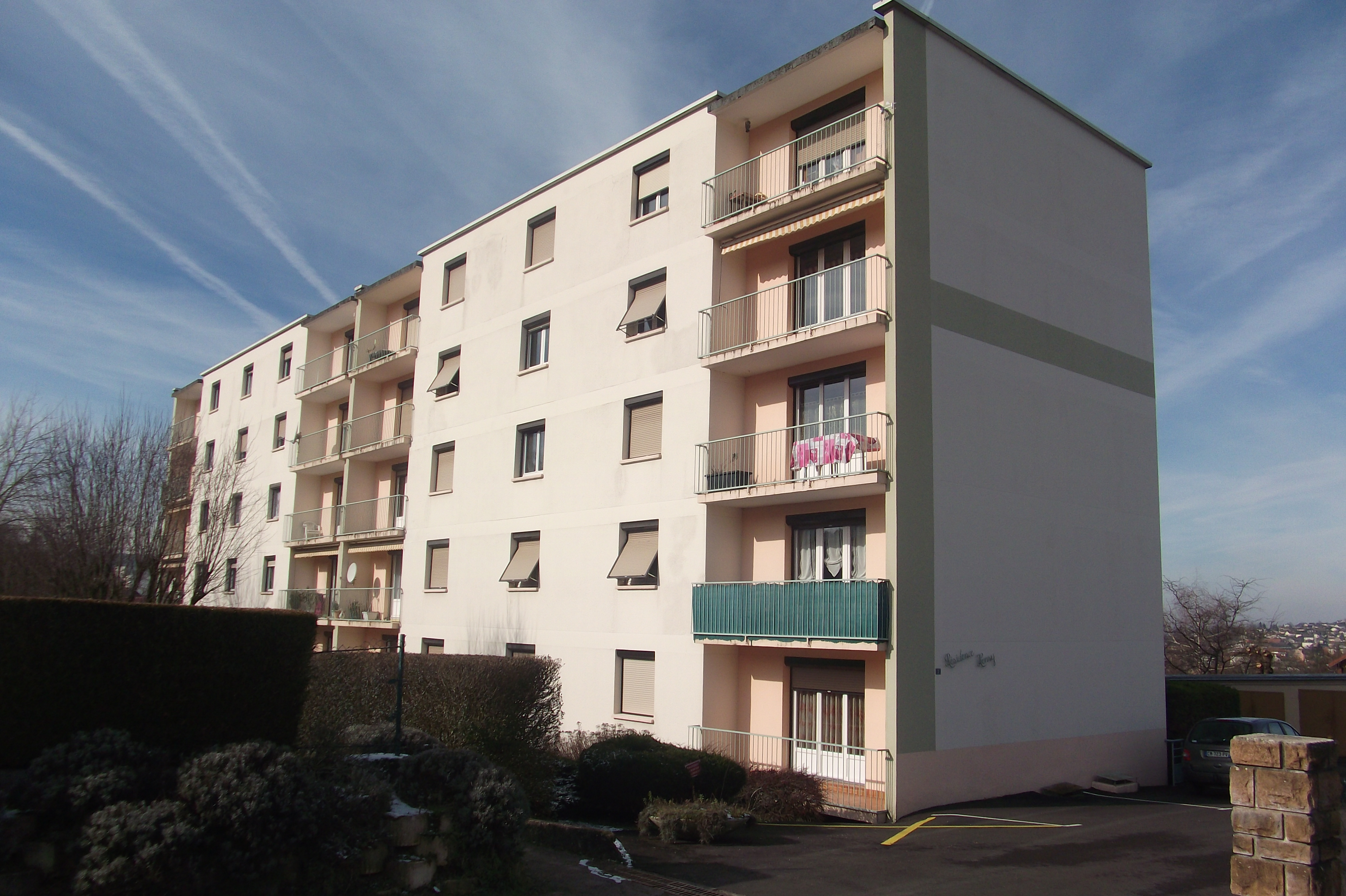
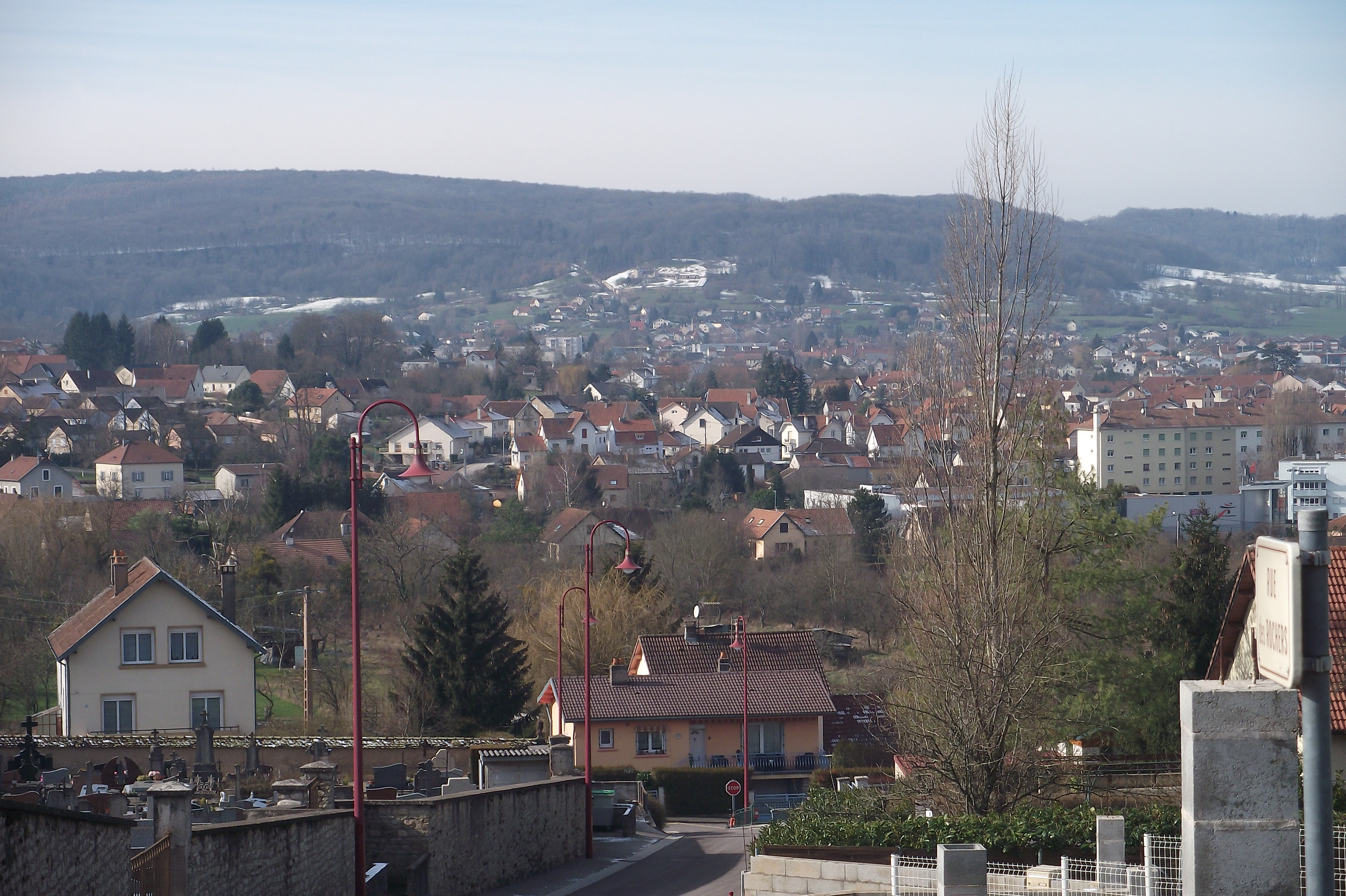

- Coat of arms
- Location of Navenne
- Location within France Location within Bourgogne-Franche-Comté
- Coordinates: 47°36′28″N 6°09′56″E
- Country: France
- Region: Bourgogne-Franche-Comté
- Department: Haute-Saône
- Arrondissement: Vesoul
- Canton: Vesoul-2
- Intercommunality: CA Vesoul

Government
  - Mayor (2020–2026): Serge Dudnik
- Area^{1}: 3.91 km^{2} (1.51 sq mi)
- Highest elevation: 441 m (1,447 ft)
- Lowest elevation: 223 m (732 ft)
- Population (2023): 1,579
  - Density: 404/km^{2} (1,050/sq mi)
- Time zone: UTC+01:00 (CET)
  - Summer (DST): UTC+02:00 (CEST)
- INSEE/Postal code: 70378 /70000
- ^{1} French Land Register data, which excludes lakes, ponds, glaciers > 1 km^{2} (0.386 sq mi or 247 acres) and river estuaries.

Navenne (French pronunciation: [navɛn]) is a commune in the Haute-Saône department in the region of Bourgogne-Franche-Comté in eastern France.

The town is located near Vesoul.

== Gallery ==
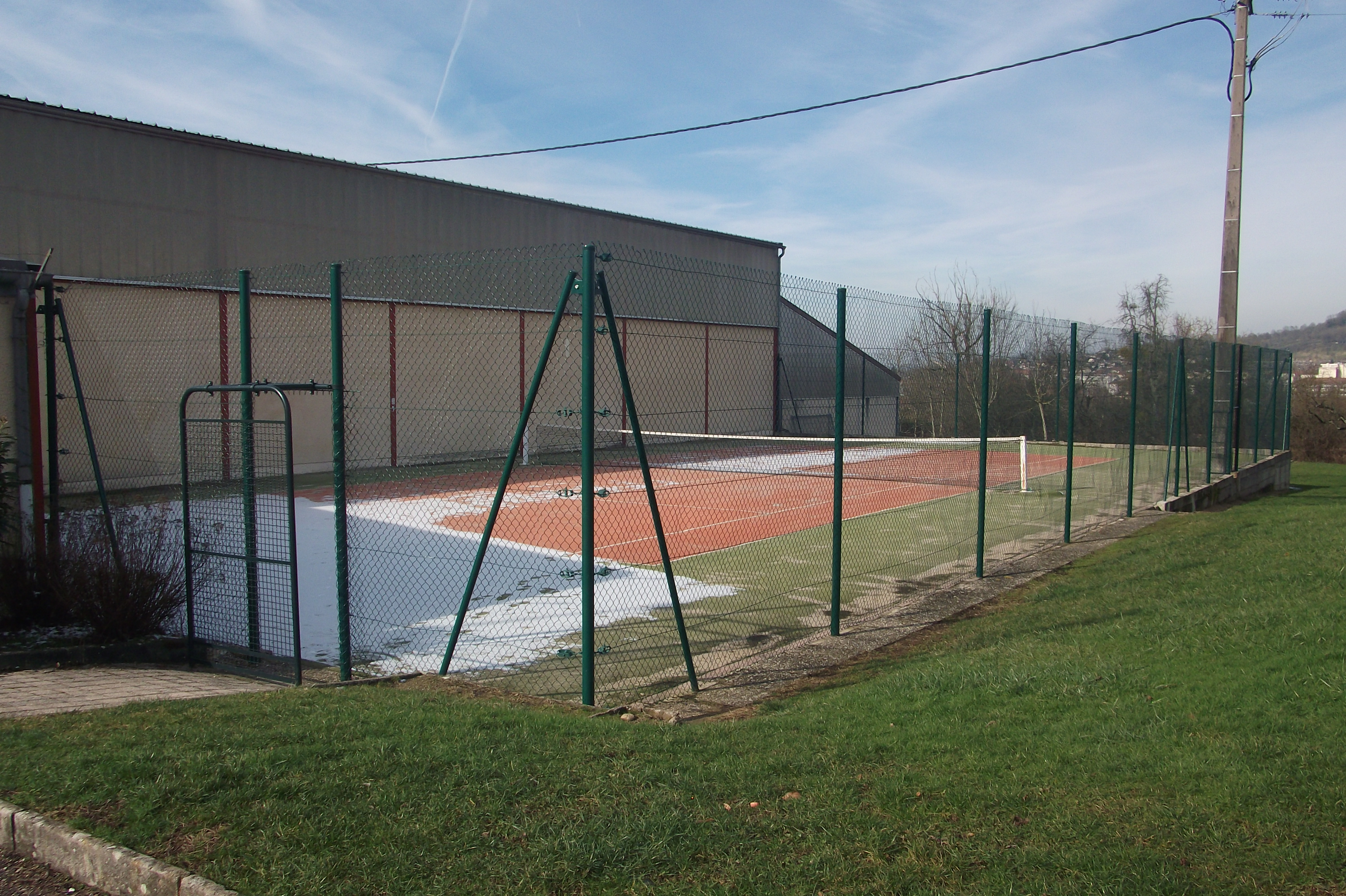

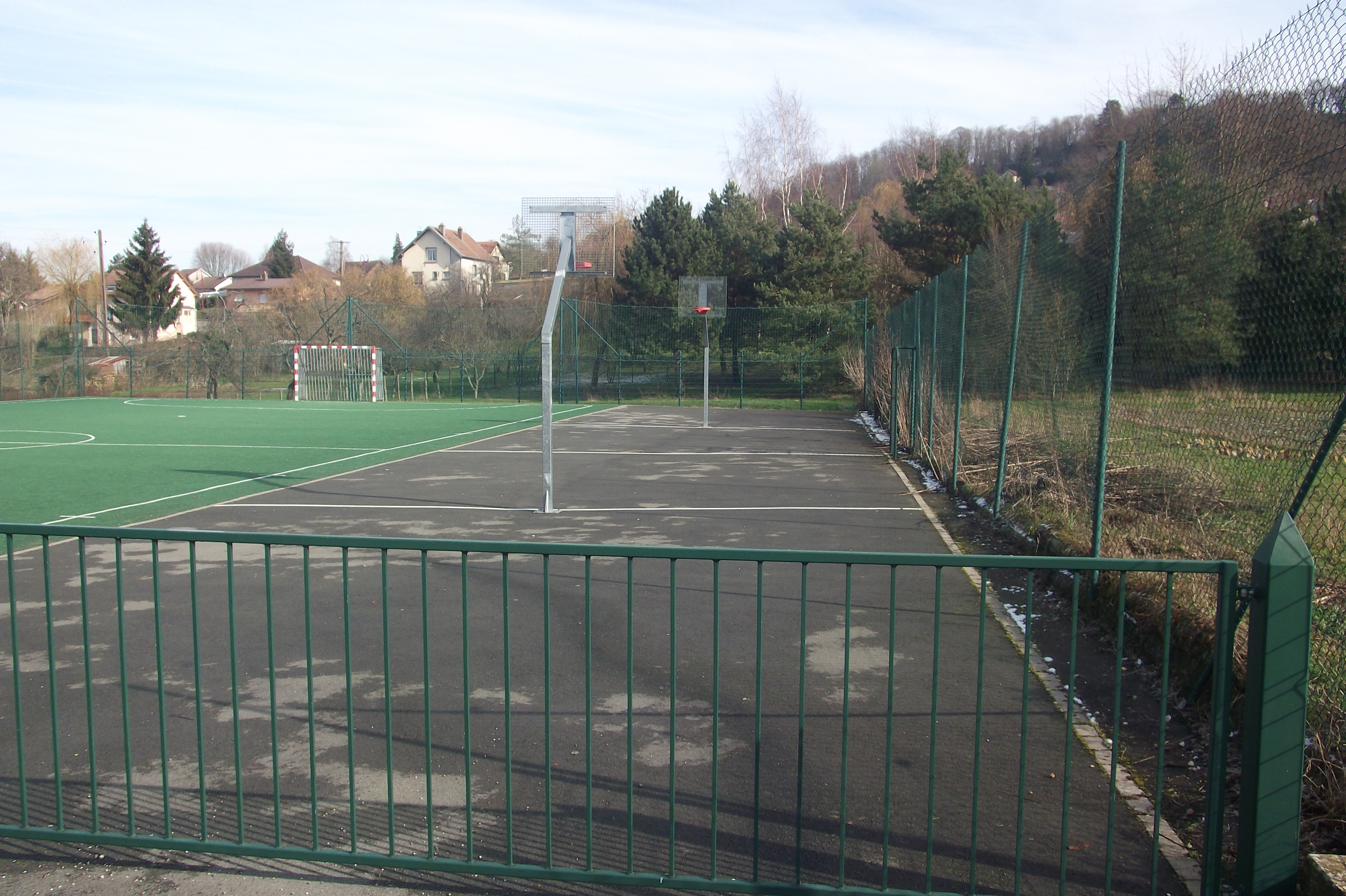

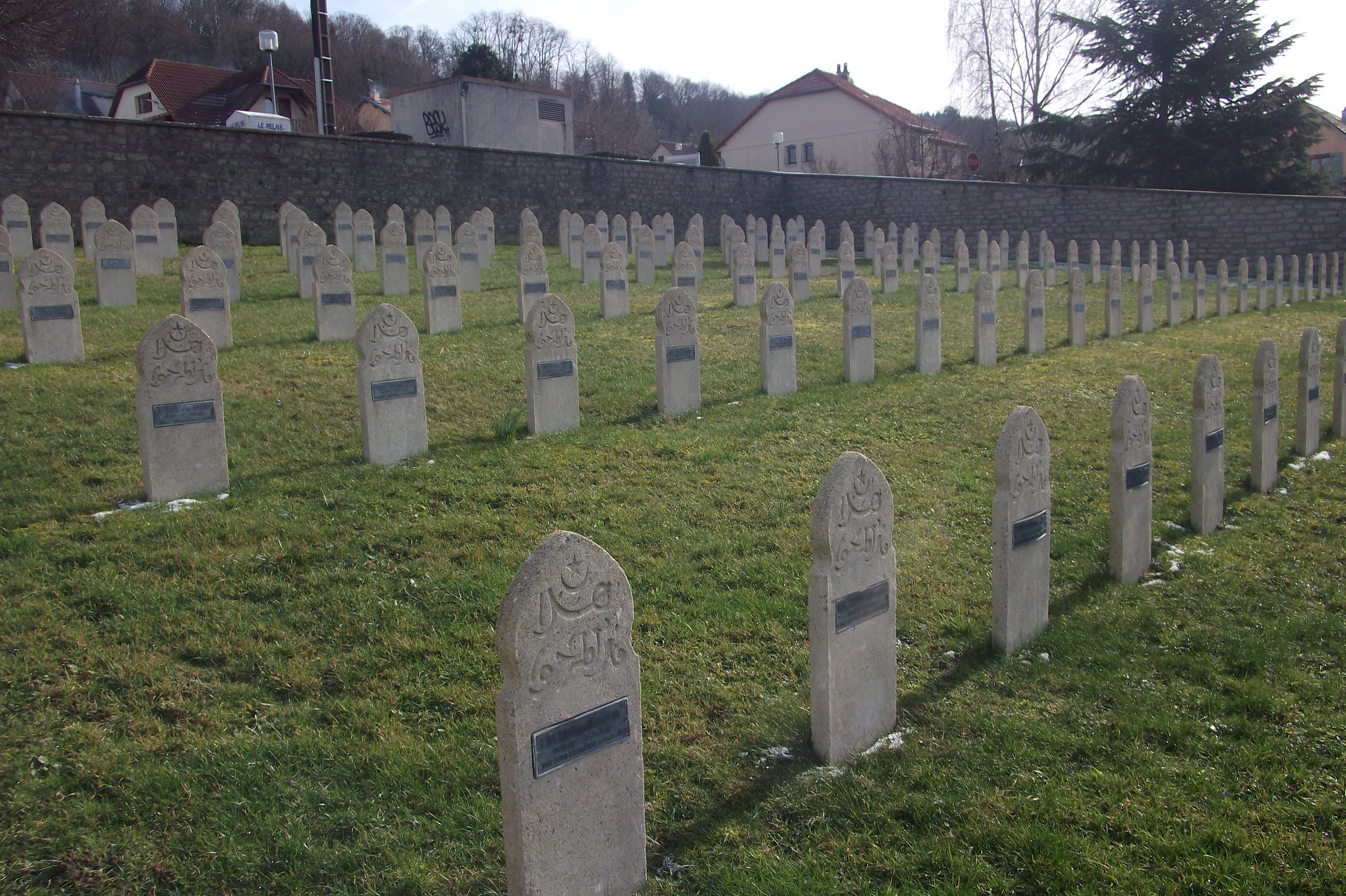

== See also ==
- Communes of the Haute-Saône department
- Communauté d'agglomération de Vesoul
- Arrondissement of Vesoul
