= Varogne =

- Commune
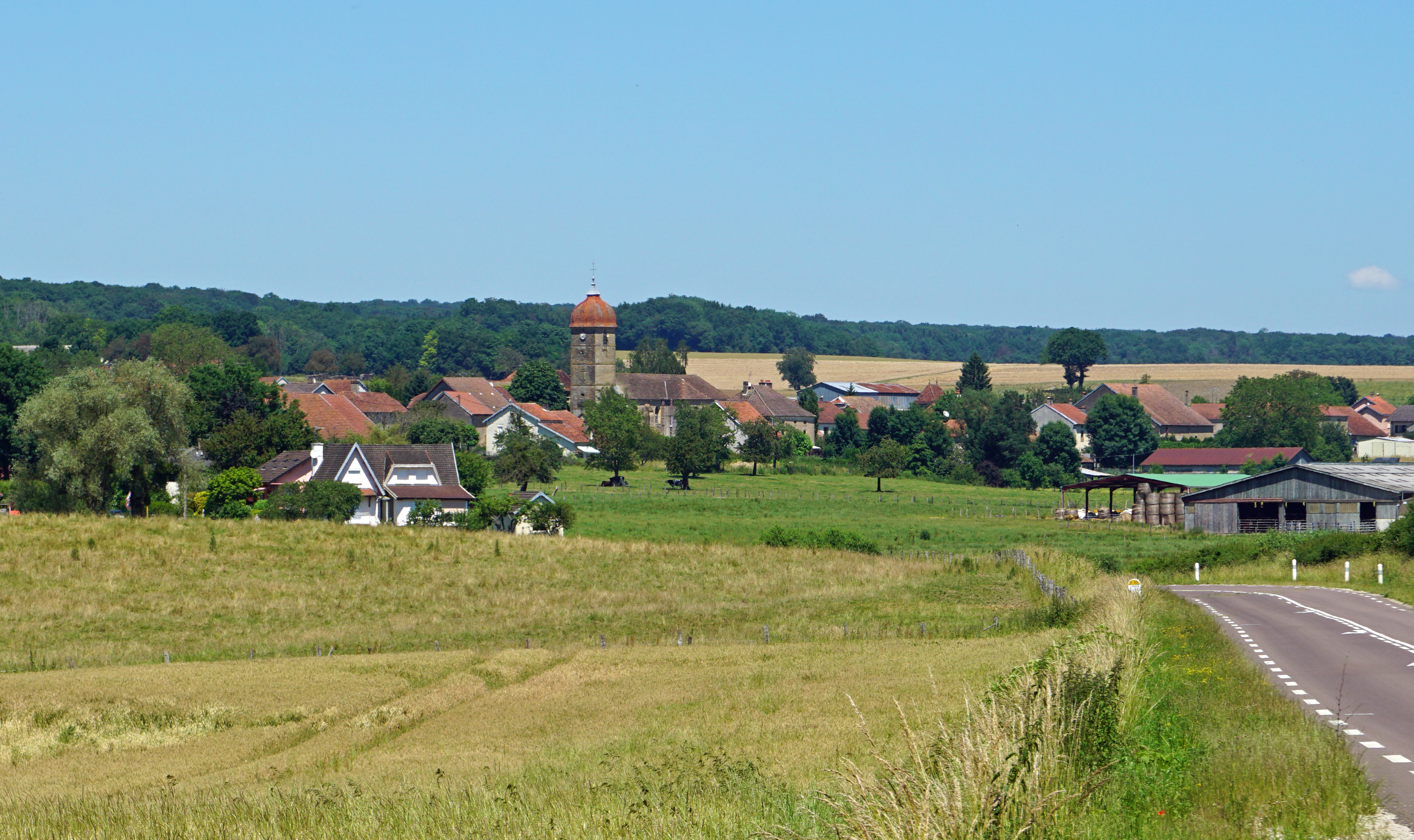
- A general view of Varogne

- Coat of arms
- Location of Varogne
- Location within France Location within Bourgogne-Franche-Comté
- Coordinates: 47°42′57″N 6°12′20″E
- Country: France
- Region: Bourgogne-Franche-Comté
- Department: Haute-Saône
- Arrondissement: Vesoul
- Canton: Vesoul-2

Government
  - Mayor (2020–2026): Yannick Franchequin
- Area^{1}: 4.41 km^{2} (1.70 sq mi)
- Highest elevation: 330 m (1,080 ft)
- Lowest elevation: 243 m (797 ft)
- Population (2023): 155
  - Density: 35.1/km^{2} (91.0/sq mi)
- Time zone: UTC+01:00 (CET)
  - Summer (DST): UTC+02:00 (CEST)
- INSEE/Postal code: 70522 /70240
- ^{1} French Land Register data, which excludes lakes, ponds, glaciers > 1 km^{2} (0.386 sq mi or 247 acres) and river estuaries.

Varogne (French pronunciation: [vaʁɔɲ]) is a commune in the Haute-Saône department in the region of Bourgogne-Franche-Comté in eastern France.

== See also ==
- Communes of the Haute-Saône department
