= Colombier, Haute-Saône =

Colombier
- Commune
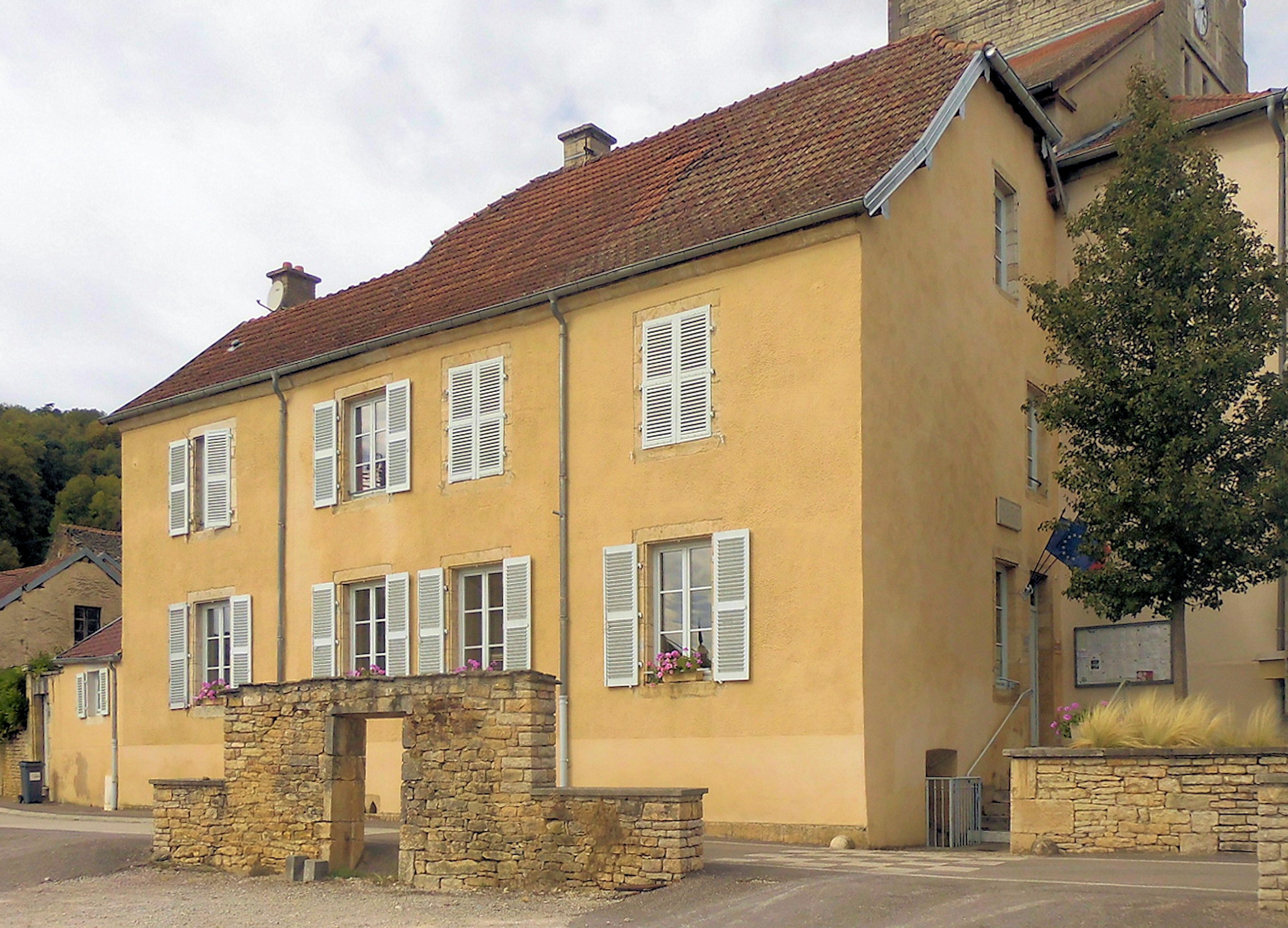
- The town hall in Colombier

- Coat of arms
- Location of Colombier
- Location within France Location within Bourgogne-Franche-Comté
- Coordinates: 47°39′52″N 6°12′40″E
- Country: France
- Region: Bourgogne-Franche-Comté
- Department: Haute-Saône
- Arrondissement: Vesoul
- Canton: Vesoul-2
- Intercommunality: CA Vesoul
- Area^{1}: 13.91 km^{2} (5.37 sq mi)
- Highest elevation: 375 m (1,230 ft)
- Lowest elevation: 222 m (728 ft)
- Population (2023): 434
  - Density: 31.2/km^{2} (80.8/sq mi)
- Time zone: UTC+01:00 (CET)
  - Summer (DST): UTC+02:00 (CEST)
- INSEE/Postal code: 70163 /70000
- ^{1} French Land Register data, which excludes lakes, ponds, glaciers > 1 km^{2} (0.386 sq mi or 247 acres) and river estuaries.

Colombier (French pronunciation: [kɔlɔ̃bje]) is a commune in the Haute-Saône department in the region of Bourgogne-Franche-Comté in eastern France.

The town is located near Vesoul.

== See also ==
- Communes of the Haute-Saône department
- Communauté d'agglomération de Vesoul
- Arrondissement of Vesoul
