= Andelarrot =

- Commune
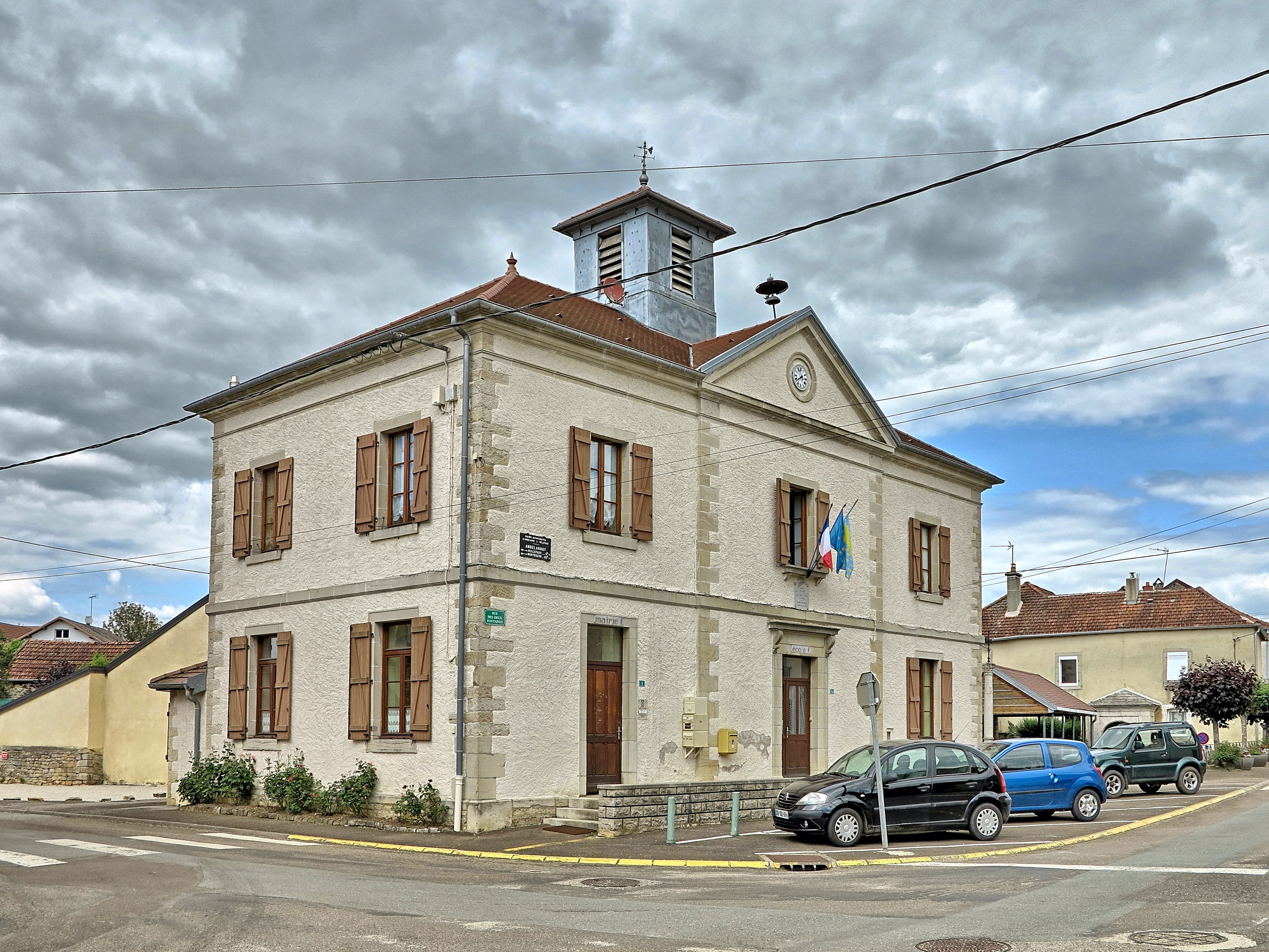
- The town hall in Andelarrot

- Coat of arms
- Location of Andelarrot
- Location within France Location within Bourgogne-Franche-Comté
- Coordinates: 47°34′55″N 6°06′18″E
- Country: France
- Region: Bourgogne-Franche-Comté
- Department: Haute-Saône
- Arrondissement: Vesoul
- Canton: Vesoul-1
- Intercommunality: CA Vesoul

Government
  - Mayor (2020–2026): Gérard Cousin
- Area^{1}: 5.71 km^{2} (2.20 sq mi)
- Highest elevation: 431 m (1,414 ft)
- Lowest elevation: 289 m (948 ft)
- Population (2023): 246
  - Density: 43.1/km^{2} (112/sq mi)
- Time zone: UTC+01:00 (CET)
  - Summer (DST): UTC+02:00 (CEST)
- INSEE/Postal code: 70020 /70000
- ^{1} French Land Register data, which excludes lakes, ponds, glaciers > 1 km^{2} (0.386 sq mi or 247 acres) and river estuaries.

Andelarrot (French pronunciation: [ɑ̃dlaʁo]) is a commune in the Haute-Saône department in the region of Bourgogne-Franche-Comté in eastern France.

The town is located near Vesoul.

== See also ==
- Communes of the Haute-Saône department
- Communauté d'agglomération de Vesoul
- Arrondissement of Vesoul
