= Noidans-lès-Vesoul =

- Commune
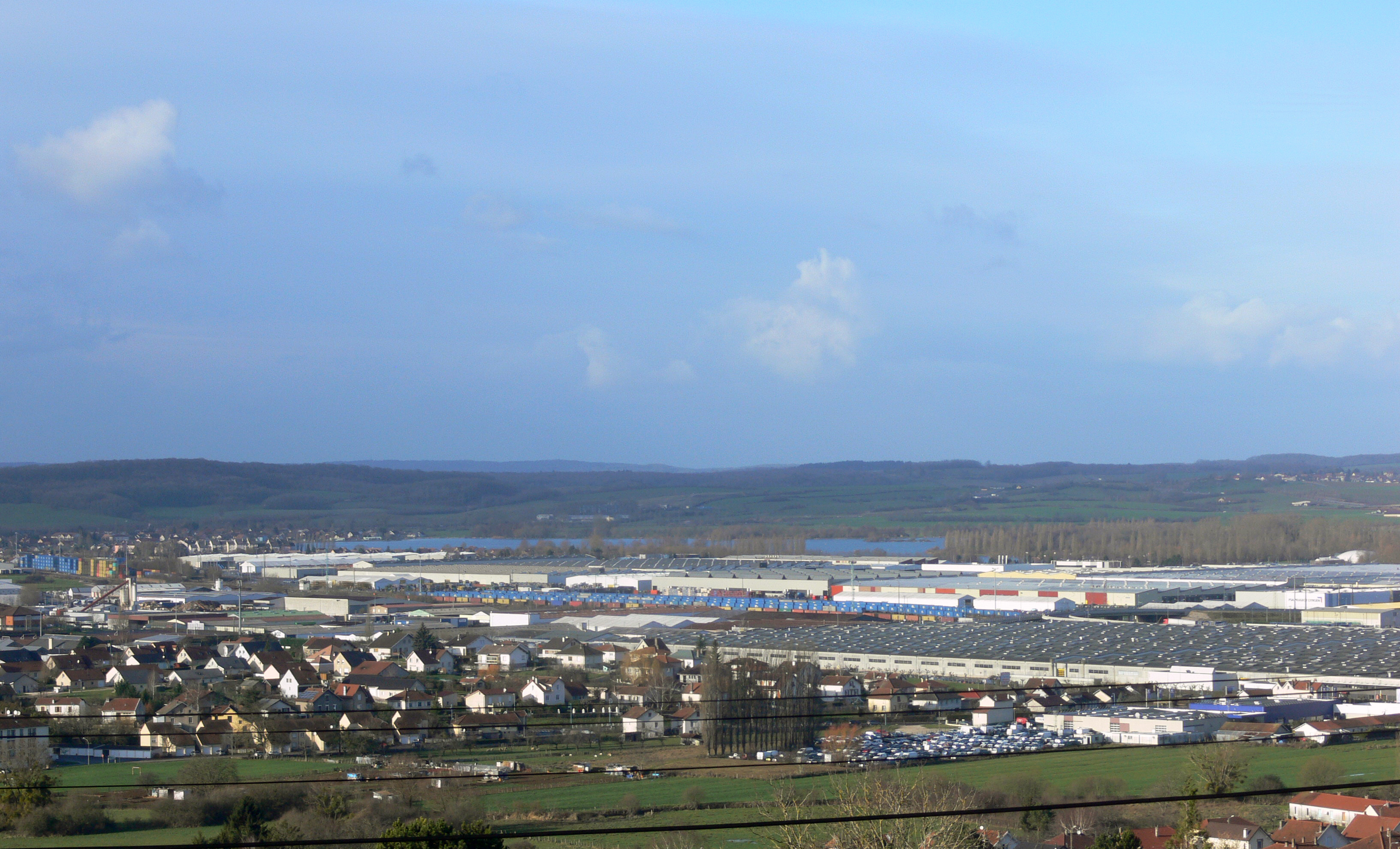
- The Peugeot factories in Vesoul

- Coat of arms
- Location of Noidans-lès-Vesoul
- Location within France Location within Bourgogne-Franche-Comté
- Coordinates: 47°36′55″N 6°07′35″E
- Country: France
- Region: Bourgogne-Franche-Comté
- Department: Haute-Saône
- Arrondissement: Vesoul
- Canton: Vesoul-1
- Intercommunality: CA Vesoul

Government
  - Mayor (2020–2026): Sylvain Guillemain
- Area^{1}: 8.64 km^{2} (3.34 sq mi)
- Highest elevation: 434 m (1,424 ft)
- Lowest elevation: 215 m (705 ft)
- Population (2023): 1,973
  - Density: 228/km^{2} (591/sq mi)
- Time zone: UTC+01:00 (CET)
  - Summer (DST): UTC+02:00 (CEST)
- INSEE/Postal code: 70388 /70000
- ^{1} French Land Register data, which excludes lakes, ponds, glaciers > 1 km^{2} (0.386 sq mi or 247 acres) and river estuaries.

Noidans-lès-Vesoul (French pronunciation: [nwadɑ̃ lɛ vəzul], literally Noidans near Vesoul) is a commune in the Haute-Saône department in the region of Bourgogne-Franche-Comté in eastern France.

The town is located near Vesoul.

== See also ==
- Communes of the Haute-Saône department
- Communauté d'agglomération de Vesoul
- Arrondissement of Vesoul
