= Pusy-et-Épenoux =

- Commune
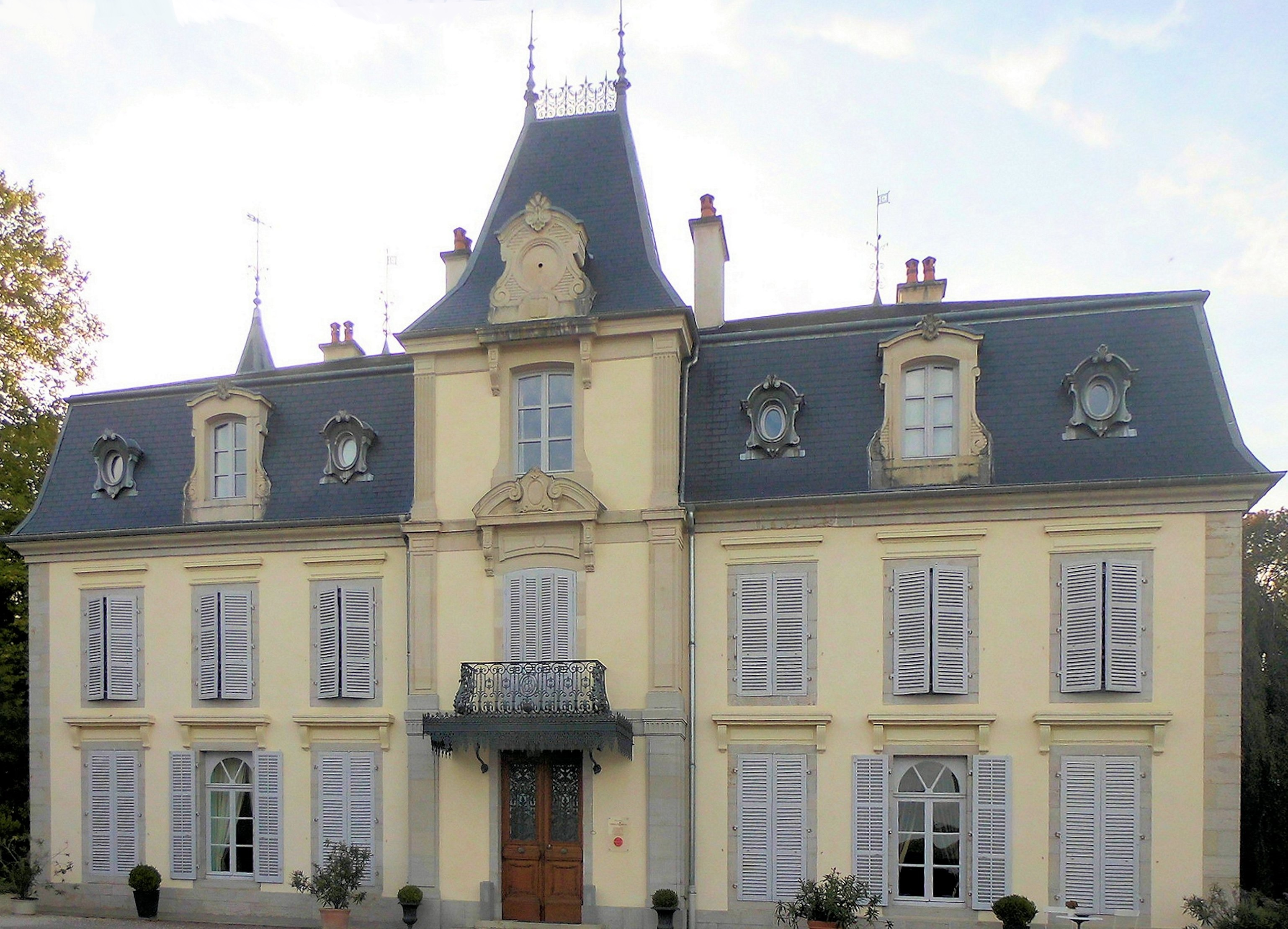
- The chateau in Pusy-et-Épenoux
- Location of Pusy-et-Épenoux
- Location within France Location within Bourgogne-Franche-Comté
- Coordinates: 47°40′07″N 6°09′04″E
- Country: France
- Region: Bourgogne-Franche-Comté
- Department: Haute-Saône
- Arrondissement: Vesoul
- Canton: Vesoul-1
- Intercommunality: CA Vesoul
- Area^{1}: 10.07 km^{2} (3.89 sq mi)
- Highest elevation: 294 m (965 ft)
- Lowest elevation: 218 m (715 ft)
- Population (2023): 540
  - Density: 54/km^{2} (140/sq mi)
- Time zone: UTC+01:00 (CET)
  - Summer (DST): UTC+02:00 (CEST)
- INSEE/Postal code: 70429 /70000
- ^{1} French Land Register data, which excludes lakes, ponds, glaciers > 1 km^{2} (0.386 sq mi or 247 acres) and river estuaries.

Pusy-et-Épenoux is a commune in the Haute-Saône department in the region of Bourgogne-Franche-Comté in eastern France.

The town is located near Vesoul.

== See also ==
- Communes of the Haute-Saône department
- Communauté d'agglomération de Vesoul
- Arrondissement of Vesoul
