= Coulevon =

- Commune
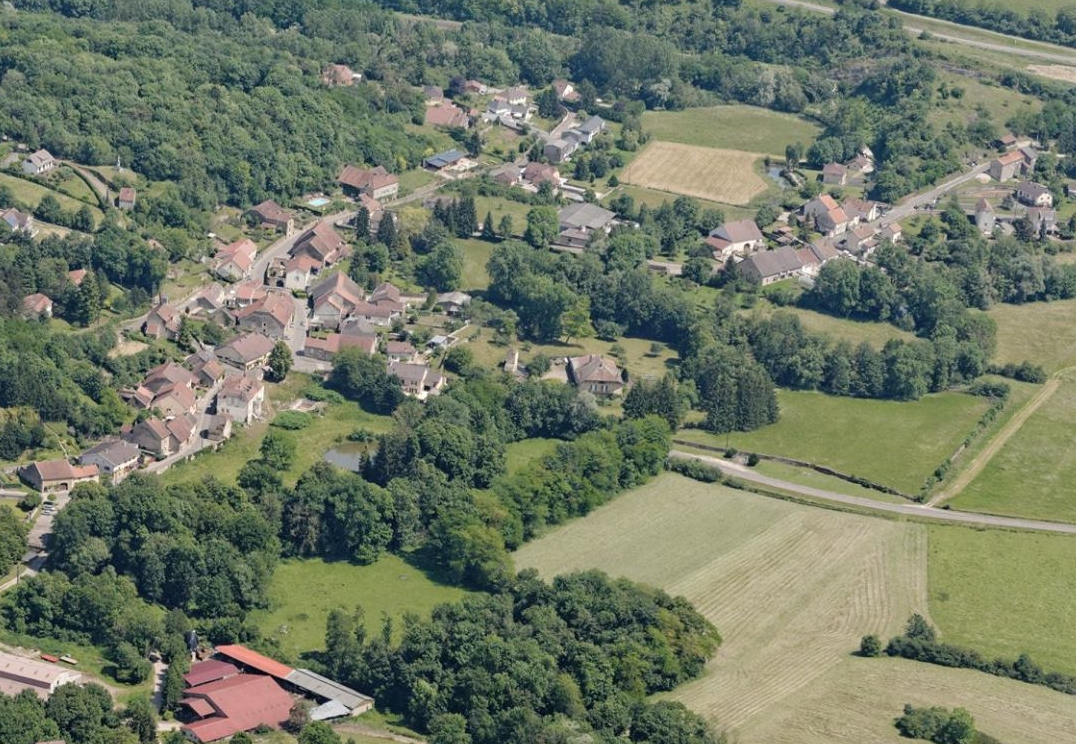
- An aerial view of Coulevon
- Location of Coulevon
- Location within France Location within Bourgogne-Franche-Comté
- Coordinates: 47°38′45″N 6°10′56″E
- Country: France
- Region: Bourgogne-Franche-Comté
- Department: Haute-Saône
- Arrondissement: Vesoul
- Canton: Vesoul-2
- Intercommunality: CA Vesoul
- Area^{1}: 2.66 km^{2} (1.03 sq mi)
- Highest elevation: 296 m (971 ft)
- Lowest elevation: 221 m (725 ft)
- Population (2023): 176
  - Density: 66.2/km^{2} (171/sq mi)
- Time zone: UTC+01:00 (CET)
  - Summer (DST): UTC+02:00 (CEST)
- INSEE/Postal code: 70179 /70000
- ^{1} French Land Register data, which excludes lakes, ponds, glaciers > 1 km^{2} (0.386 sq mi or 247 acres) and river estuaries.

Coulevon is a commune in the Haute-Saône department in the region of Bourgogne-Franche-Comté in eastern France.

The town is located near Vesoul.

== See also ==
- Communes of the Haute-Saône department
- Communauté d'agglomération de Vesoul
- Arrondissement of Vesoul
