= La Villeneuve-Bellenoye-et-la-Maize =

- Commune
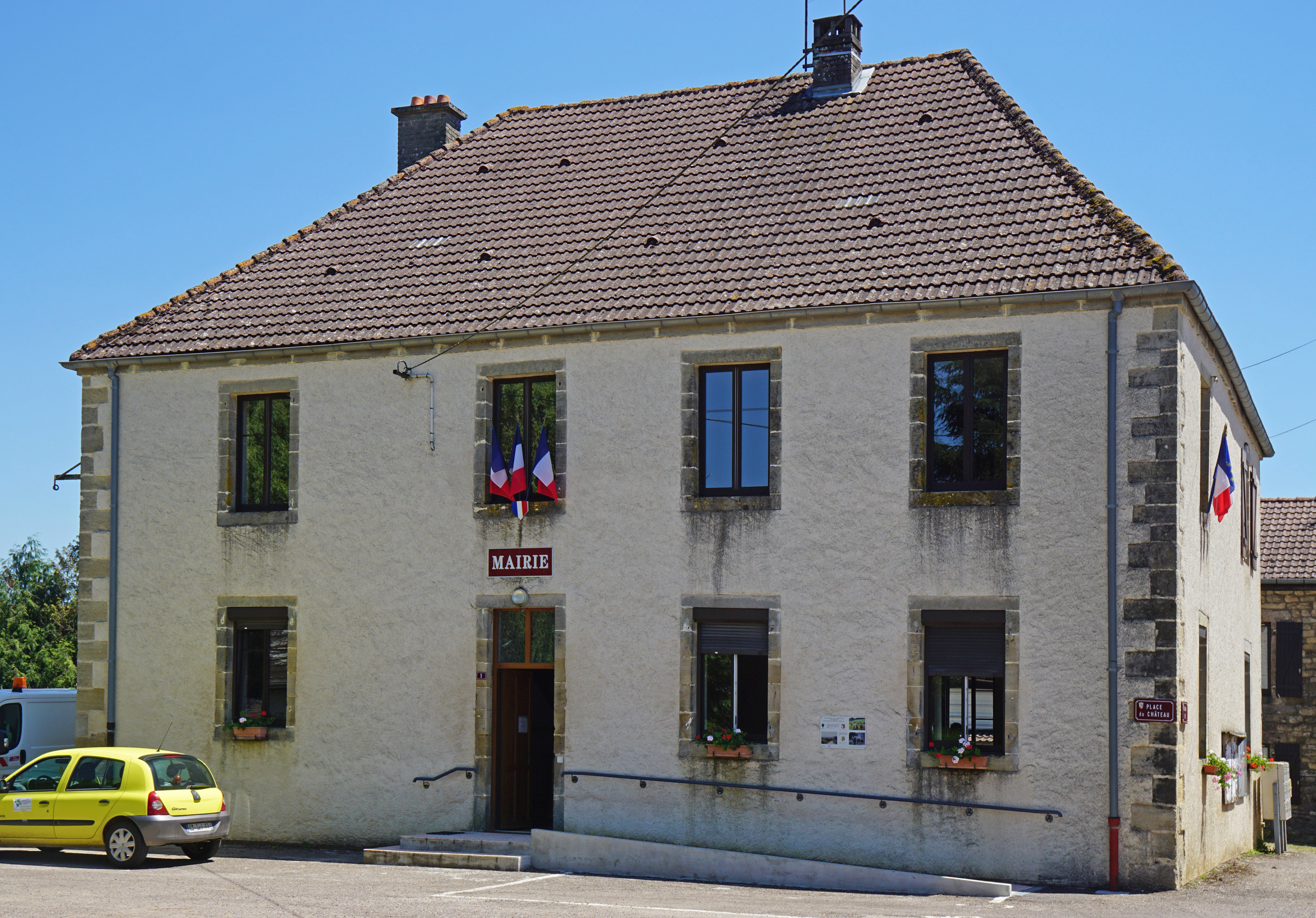
- The town hall in La Villeneuve-Bellenoye-et-la-Maize

- Coat of arms
- Location of La Villeneuve-Bellenoye-et-la-Maize
- Location within France Location within Bourgogne-Franche-Comté
- Coordinates: 47°42′30″N 6°15′05″E
- Country: France
- Region: Bourgogne-Franche-Comté
- Department: Haute-Saône
- Arrondissement: Vesoul
- Canton: Vesoul-2

Government
  - Mayor (2020–2026): Joël Rieser
- Area^{1}: 9.21 km^{2} (3.56 sq mi)
- Highest elevation: 396 m (1,299 ft)
- Lowest elevation: 230 m (750 ft)
- Population (2023): 160
  - Density: 17/km^{2} (45/sq mi)
- Time zone: UTC+01:00 (CET)
  - Summer (DST): UTC+02:00 (CEST)
- INSEE/Postal code: 70558 /70240
- ^{1} French Land Register data, which excludes lakes, ponds, glaciers > 1 km^{2} (0.386 sq mi or 247 acres) and river estuaries.

La Villeneuve-Bellenoye-et-la-Maize (French pronunciation: [la vilnœv bɛlnwa e la mɛz]) is a commune in the Haute-Saône department in the region of Bourgogne-Franche-Comté in eastern France.

== See also ==
- Communes of the Haute-Saône department
