= Chariez =

- Commune
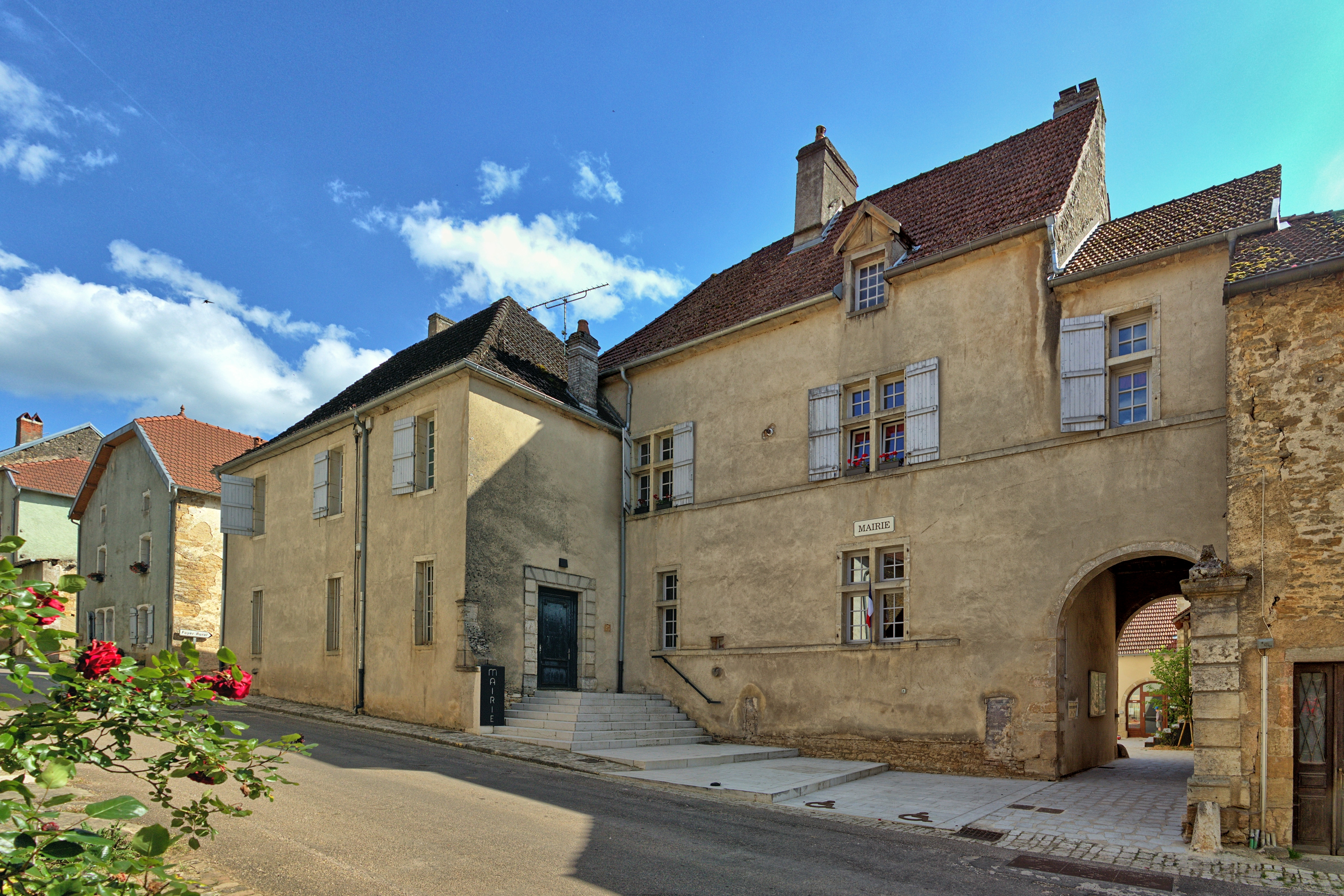
- The town hall in Chariez

- Coat of arms
- Location of Chariez
- Location within France Location within Bourgogne-Franche-Comté
- Coordinates: 47°37′15″N 6°05′18″E
- Country: France
- Region: Bourgogne-Franche-Comté
- Department: Haute-Saône
- Arrondissement: Vesoul
- Canton: Vesoul-1
- Intercommunality: CA Vesoul
- Area^{1}: 7.66 km^{2} (2.96 sq mi)
- Highest elevation: 426 m (1,398 ft)
- Lowest elevation: 212 m (696 ft)
- Population (2023): 227
  - Density: 29.6/km^{2} (76.8/sq mi)
- Time zone: UTC+01:00 (CET)
  - Summer (DST): UTC+02:00 (CEST)
- INSEE/Postal code: 70134 /70000
- ^{1} French Land Register data, which excludes lakes, ponds, glaciers > 1 km^{2} (0.386 sq mi or 247 acres) and river estuaries.

Chariez (French pronunciation: [ʃaʁje]) is a commune in the Haute-Saône department in the region of Bourgogne-Franche-Comté in eastern France.

The town is located near Vesoul.

== See also ==
- Communes of the Haute-Saône department
- Communauté d'agglomération de Vesoul
- Arrondissement of Vesoul
