= Communauté d'agglomération de Vesoul =

Coordinates: 47.62°N 6.16°E

Vesoul
- Communauté d'agglomération
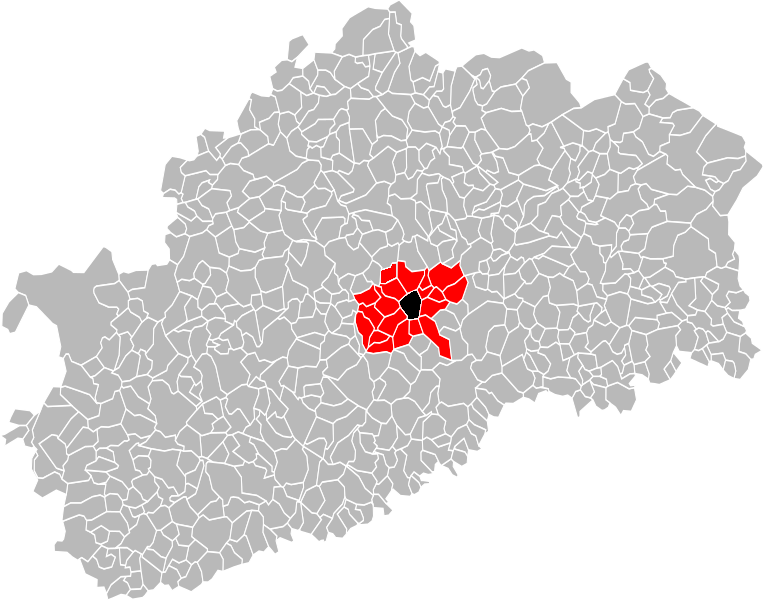
- Location within the Haute-Saône department
- Country: France
- Region: Bourgogne-Franche-Comté
- Department: Haute-Saône
- No. of communes: {{{nbcomm}}}
- Established: 2012
- Area: 145.5 km^{2} (56.2 sq mi)
- Population (2018): 32,203
  - Density: 221.3/km^{2} (573.2/sq mi)

The Communauté d'agglomération de Vesoul is a communauté d'agglomération, an intercommunal structure, in the Haute-Saône department, in the Bourgogne-Franche-Comté region, eastern France. It was created in January 2012 from the former communautés de communes de l'agglomération de Vesoul. Its seat is Vesoul. Its area is 145.5 km^{2}. Its population was 32,203 in 2018, of which 14,973 in Vesoul proper.

== Composition ==
The communauté d'agglomération consists of the following 20 communes:

1. Andelarre
2. Andelarrot
3. Chariez
4. Charmoille
5. Colombier
6. Comberjon
7. Coulevon
8. Échenoz-la-Méline
9. Frotey-lès-Vesoul
10. Montcey
11. Montigny-lès-Vesoul
12. Mont-le-Vernois
13. Navenne
14. Noidans-lès-Vesoul
15. Pusey
16. Pusy-et-Épenoux
17. Quincey
18. Vaivre-et-Montoille
19. Vesoul
20. Villeparois
