= Montigny-lès-Vesoul =

- Commune
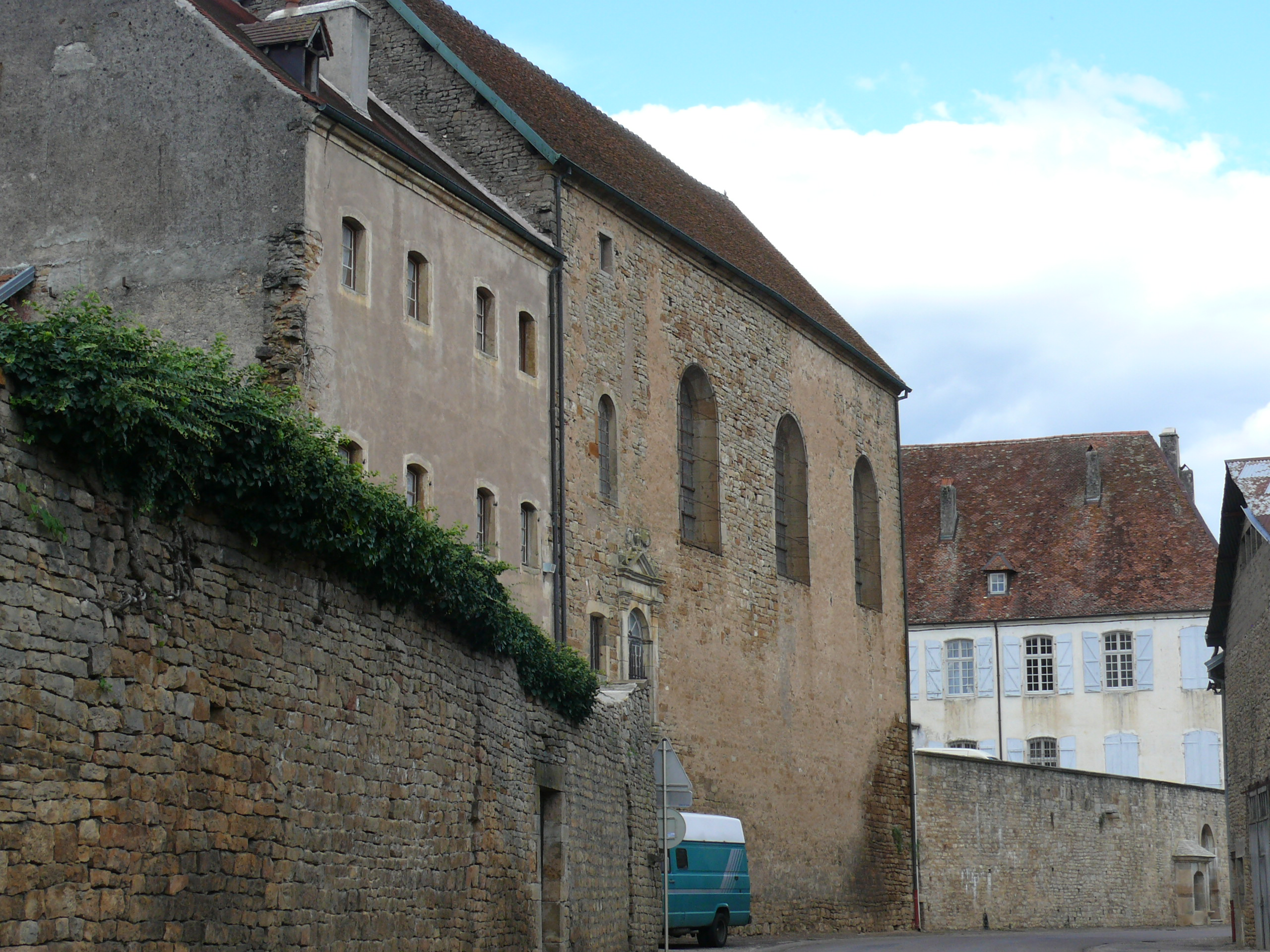
- Abbey of Montigny-lès-Vesoul

- Coat of arms
- Location of Montigny-lès-Vesoul
- Location within France Location within Bourgogne-Franche-Comté
- Coordinates: 47°38′21″N 6°04′23″E
- Country: France
- Region: Bourgogne-Franche-Comté
- Department: Haute-Saône
- Arrondissement: Vesoul
- Canton: Vesoul-1
- Intercommunality: CA Vesoul

Government
  - Mayor (2020–2026): Philippe Combrousse
- Area^{1}: 6.47 km^{2} (2.50 sq mi)
- Highest elevation: 308 m (1,010 ft)
- Lowest elevation: 212 m (696 ft)
- Population (2023): 633
  - Density: 97.8/km^{2} (253/sq mi)
- Time zone: UTC+01:00 (CET)
  - Summer (DST): UTC+02:00 (CEST)
- INSEE/Postal code: 70363 /70000
- ^{1} French Land Register data, which excludes lakes, ponds, glaciers > 1 km^{2} (0.386 sq mi or 247 acres) and river estuaries.

Montigny-lès-Vesoul (French pronunciation: [mɔ̃tiɲi lɛ vəzul], literally Montigny near Vesoul) is a commune in the Haute-Saône department in the region of Bourgogne-Franche-Comté in eastern France. The Abbey of Montigny-lès-Vesoul was founded in 1286, and completely rebuilt in the 18th century. It was closed and sold at the French Revolution, and has been a listed monument since 1997.

The town is located near Vesoul.

== Gallery ==
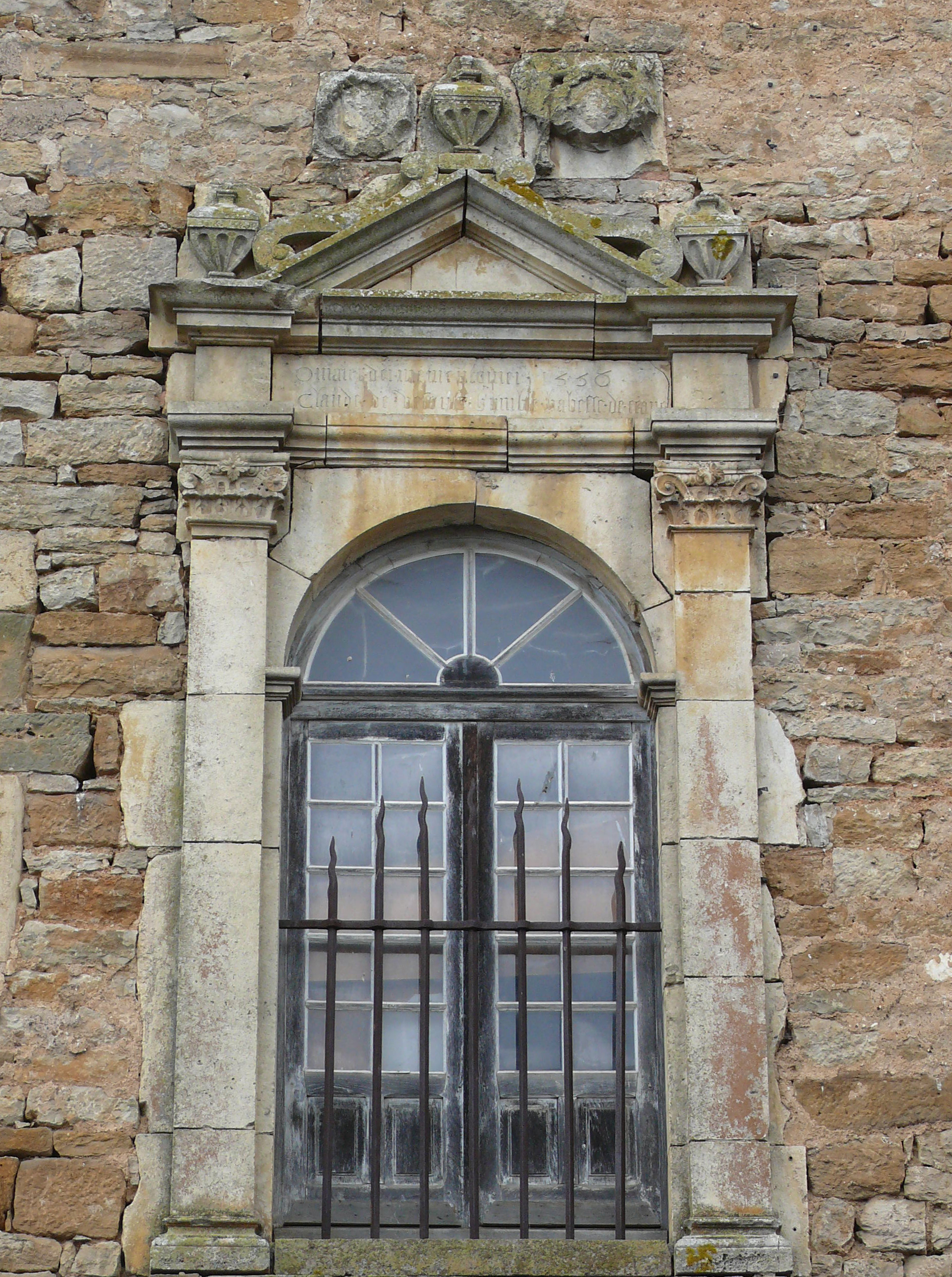
Abbey

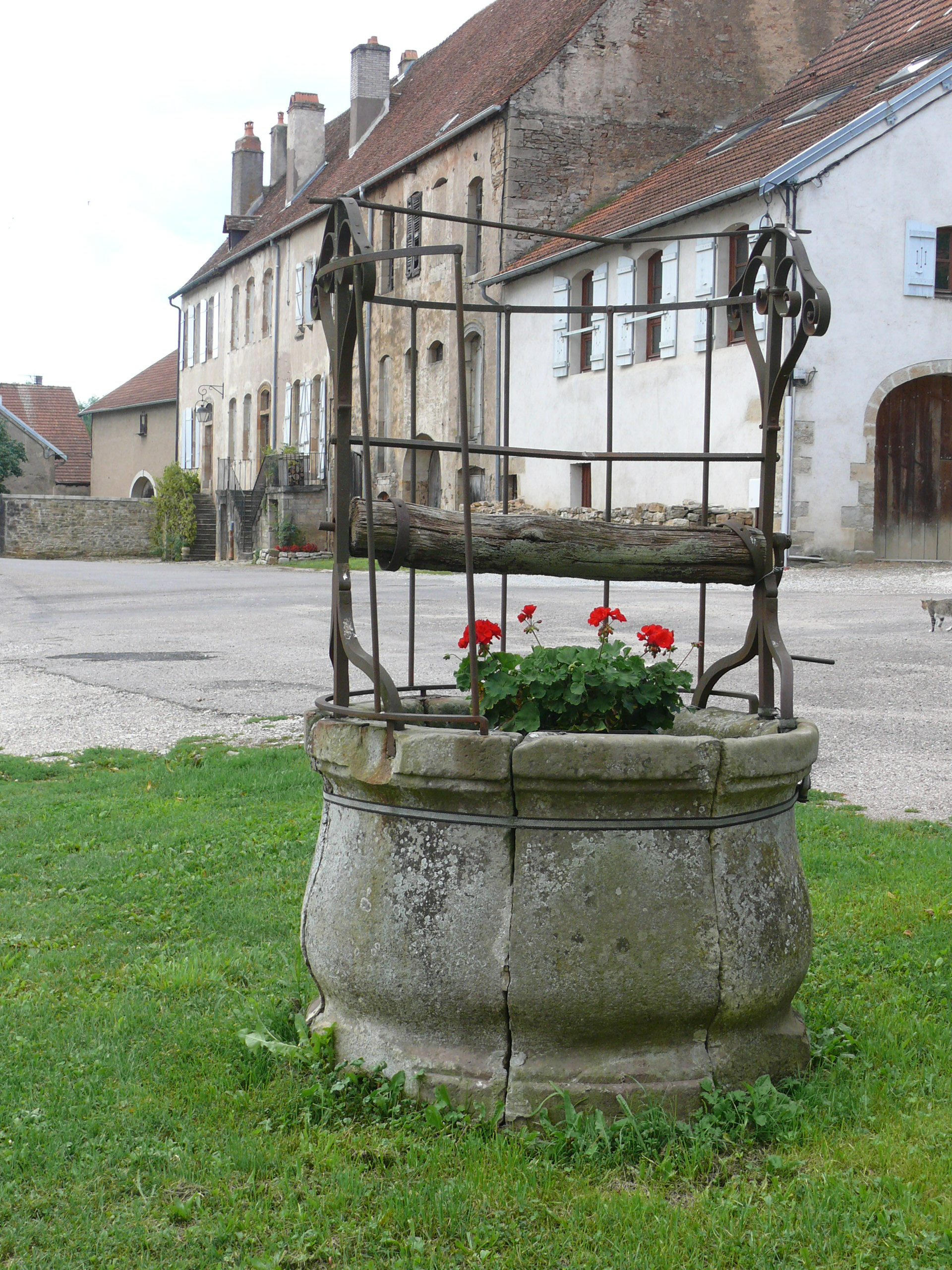
Abbey

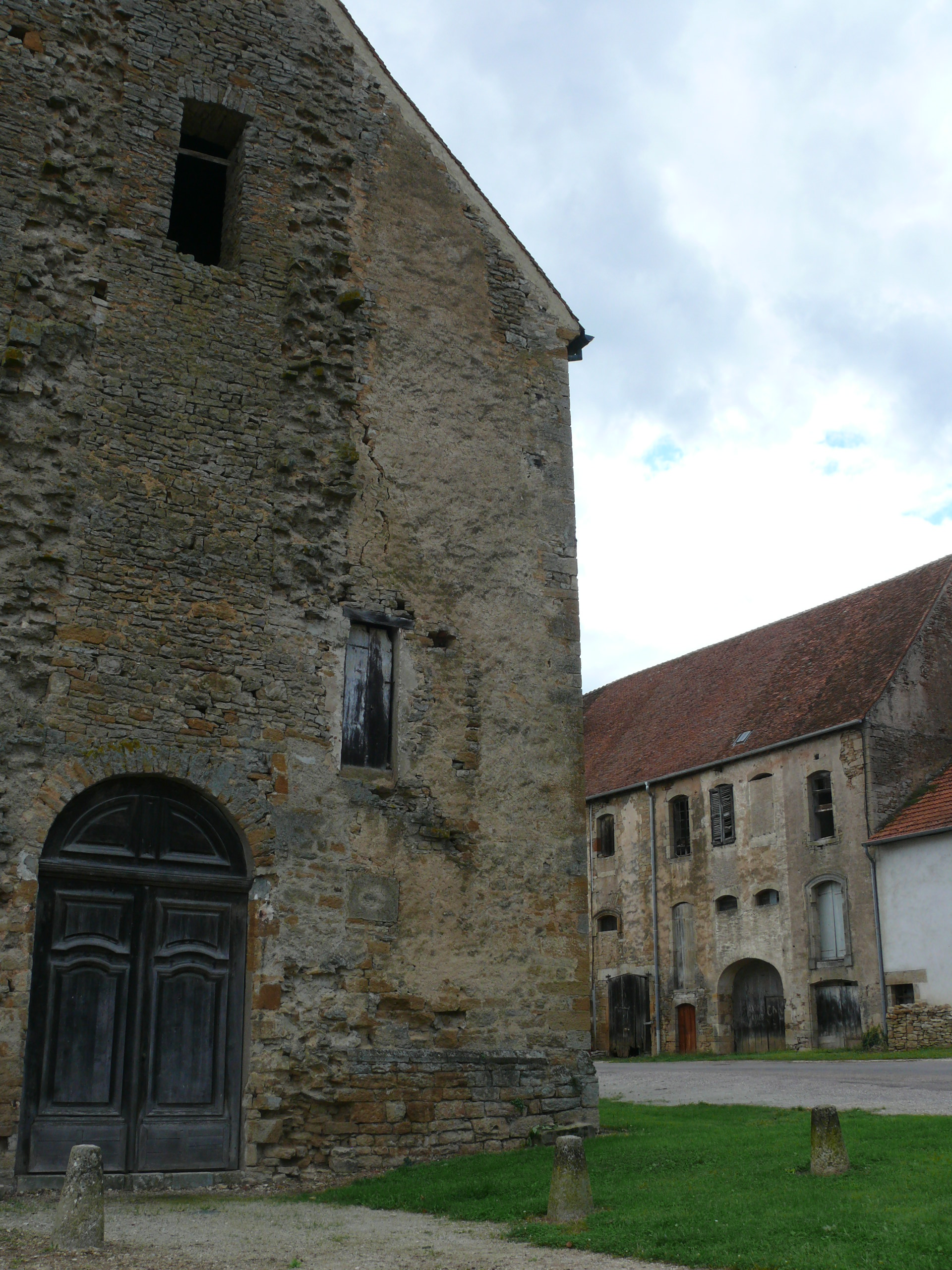
Abbey

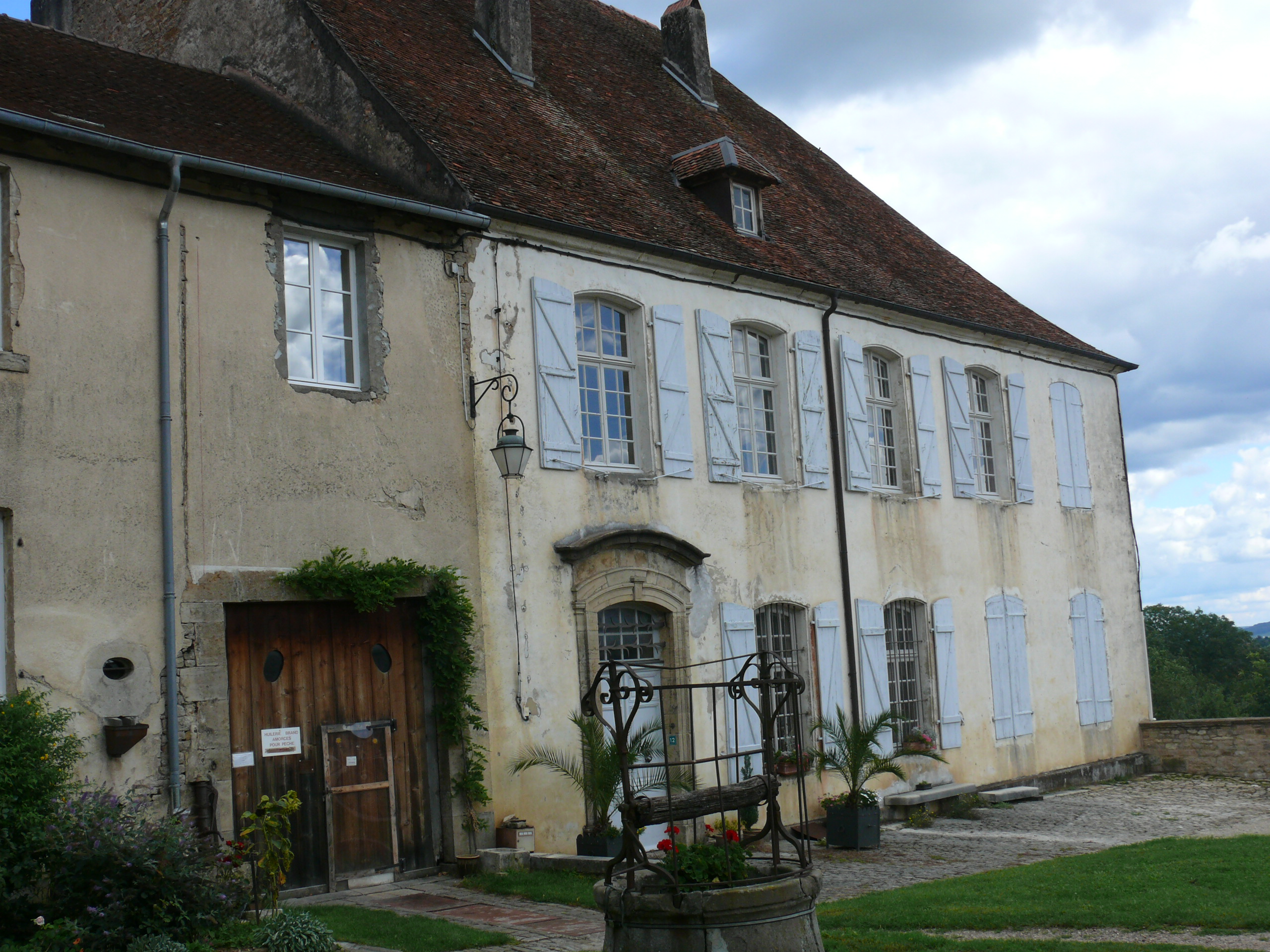
Abbey

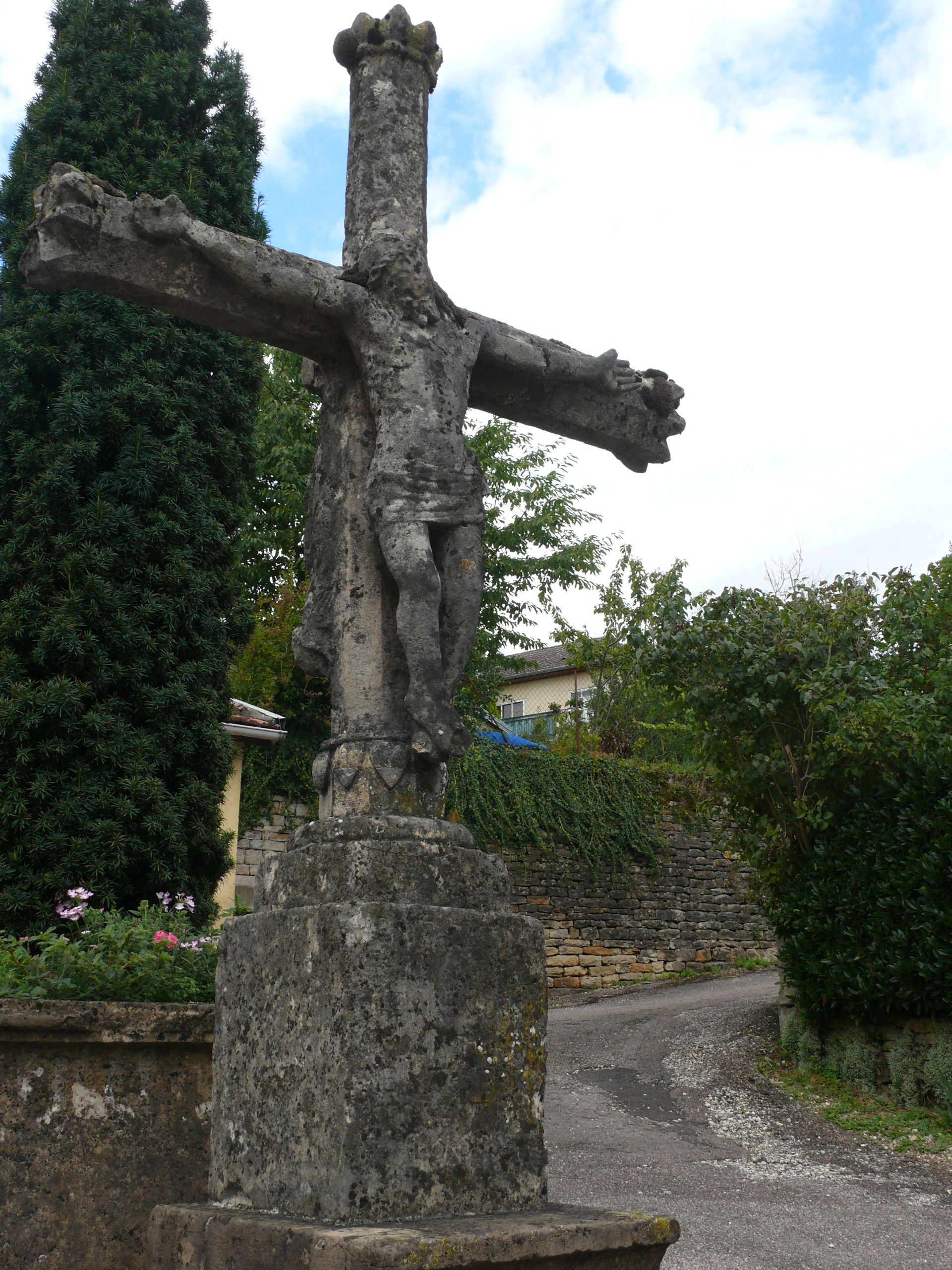
Wayside cross

== See also ==
- Communes of the Haute-Saône department
- Communauté d'agglomération de Vesoul
- Arrondissement of Vesoul
