= Vellefrie =

- Commune
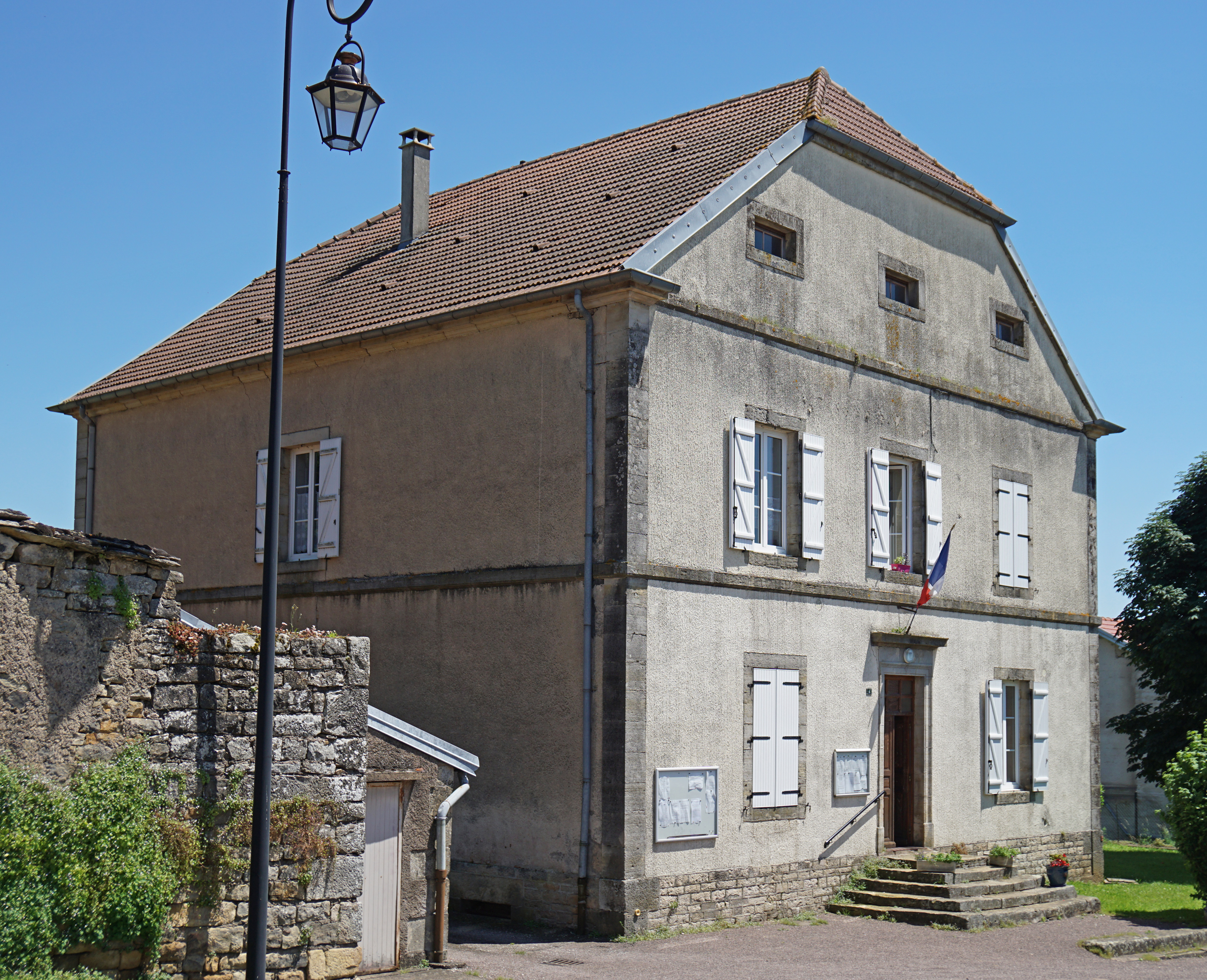
- The town hall in Vellefrie

- Coat of arms
- Location of Vellefrie
- Location within France Location within Bourgogne-Franche-Comté
- Coordinates: 47°42′21″N 6°13′16″E
- Country: France
- Region: Bourgogne-Franche-Comté
- Department: Haute-Saône
- Arrondissement: Vesoul
- Canton: Vesoul-2
- Area^{1}: 5.91 km^{2} (2.28 sq mi)
- Highest elevation: 324 m (1,063 ft)
- Lowest elevation: 232 m (761 ft)
- Population (2023): 122
  - Density: 20.6/km^{2} (53.5/sq mi)
- Time zone: UTC+01:00 (CET)
  - Summer (DST): UTC+02:00 (CEST)
- INSEE/Postal code: 70534 /70240
- ^{1} French Land Register data, which excludes lakes, ponds, glaciers > 1 km^{2} (0.386 sq mi or 247 acres) and river estuaries.

Vellefrie is a commune in the Haute-Saône department in the region of Bourgogne-Franche-Comté in eastern France.

== See also ==
- Communes of the Haute-Saône department
