= Mont-le-Vernois =

- Commune
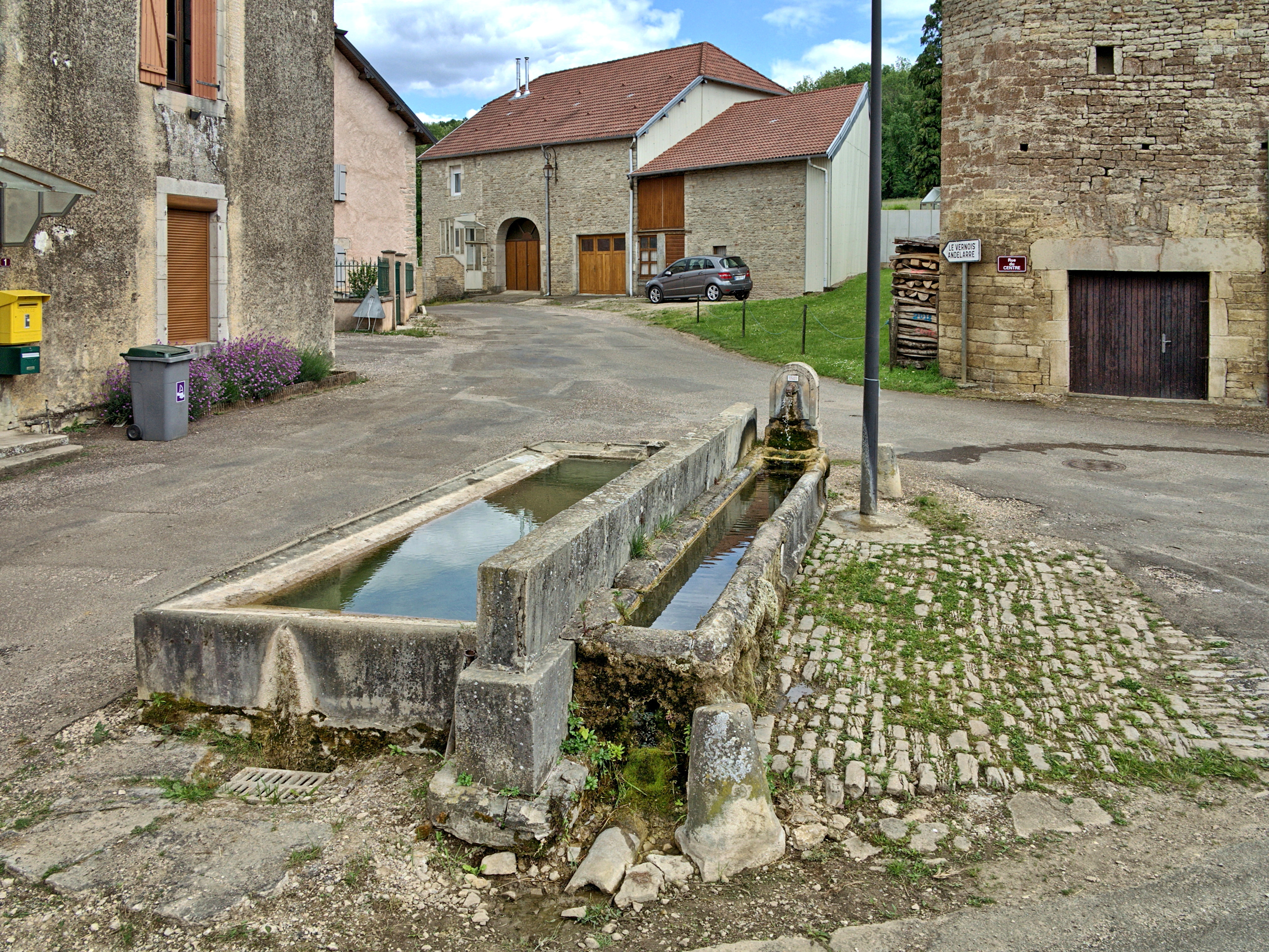
- The fountain in Mont-le-Vernois
- Location of Mont-le-Vernois
- Location within France Location within Bourgogne-Franche-Comté
- Coordinates: 47°36′15″N 6°03′42″E
- Country: France
- Region: Bourgogne-Franche-Comté
- Department: Haute-Saône
- Arrondissement: Vesoul
- Canton: Vesoul-1
- Intercommunality: CA Vesoul

Government
  - Mayor (2020–2026): Mathieu Normand
- Area^{1}: 7.76 km^{2} (3.00 sq mi)
- Highest elevation: 403 m (1,322 ft)
- Lowest elevation: 211 m (692 ft)
- Population (2023): 185
  - Density: 23.8/km^{2} (61.7/sq mi)
- Time zone: UTC+01:00 (CET)
  - Summer (DST): UTC+02:00 (CEST)
- INSEE/Postal code: 70367 /70000
- ^{1} French Land Register data, which excludes lakes, ponds, glaciers > 1 km^{2} (0.386 sq mi or 247 acres) and river estuaries.

Mont-le-Vernois (French pronunciation: [mɔ̃ lə vɛʁnwa]) is a commune in the Haute-Saône department in the region of Bourgogne-Franche-Comté in eastern France.

The town is located near Vesoul.

== See also ==
- Communes of the Haute-Saône department
- Communauté d'agglomération de Vesoul
- Arrondissement of Vesoul
