= Échenoz-la-Méline =

- Commune
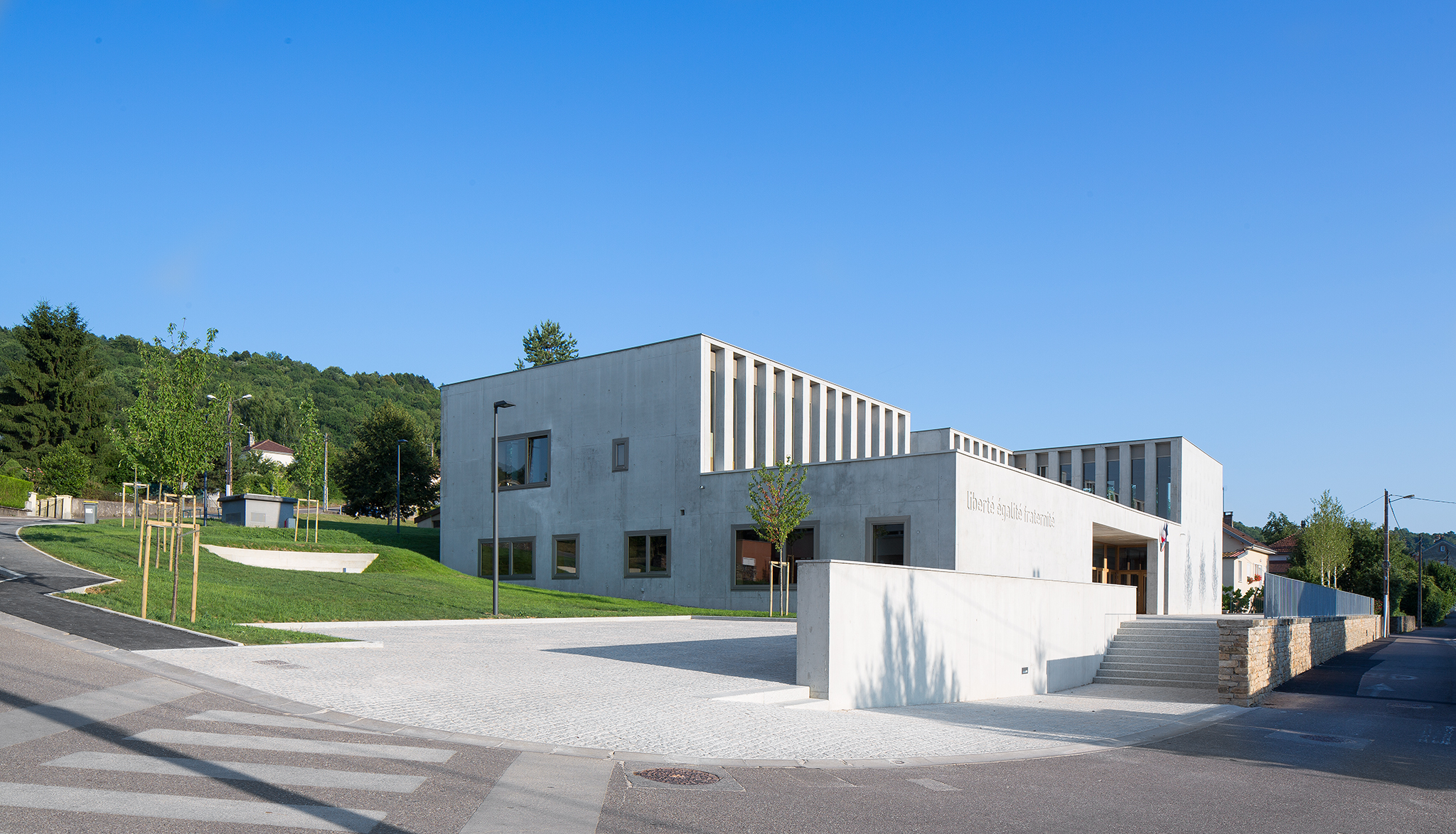
- The town hall in Échenoz-la-Méline

- Coat of arms
- Location of Échenoz-la-Méline
- Location within France Location within Bourgogne-Franche-Comté
- Coordinates: 47°36′09″N 6°08′16″E
- Country: France
- Region: Bourgogne-Franche-Comté
- Department: Haute-Saône
- Arrondissement: Vesoul
- Canton: Vesoul-1
- Intercommunality: CA Vesoul

Government
  - Mayor (2020–2026): Serge Vieille
- Area^{1}: 8.09 km^{2} (3.12 sq mi)
- Highest elevation: 447 m (1,467 ft)
- Lowest elevation: 220 m (720 ft)
- Population (2023): 3,158
  - Density: 390/km^{2} (1,010/sq mi)
- Time zone: UTC+01:00 (CET)
  - Summer (DST): UTC+02:00 (CEST)
- INSEE/Postal code: 70207 /70000
- ^{1} French Land Register data, which excludes lakes, ponds, glaciers > 1 km^{2} (0.386 sq mi or 247 acres) and river estuaries.

Échenoz-la-Méline (French pronunciation: [eʃ(ə)no la melin]) is a commune in the Haute-Saône department in the region of Bourgogne-Franche-Comté in eastern France.

The town is located near Vesoul.

== Population ==
Historical population
Year	Pop.	±% p.a.
1968	2,268	—
1975	2,660	+2.30%
1982	2,518	−0.78%
1990	2,445	−0.37%
1999	2,741	+1.28%
2007	3,006	+1.16%
2012	3,136	+0.85%
2017	3,231	+0.60%
2023	3,158	−0.38%
Source: INSEE

== See also ==
- Communes of the Haute-Saône department
- Communauté d'agglomération de Vesoul
- Arrondissement of Vesoul
