= Arrondissement of Lure =

Coordinates: 47°41′N 6°29′E

Lure
- Arrondissement
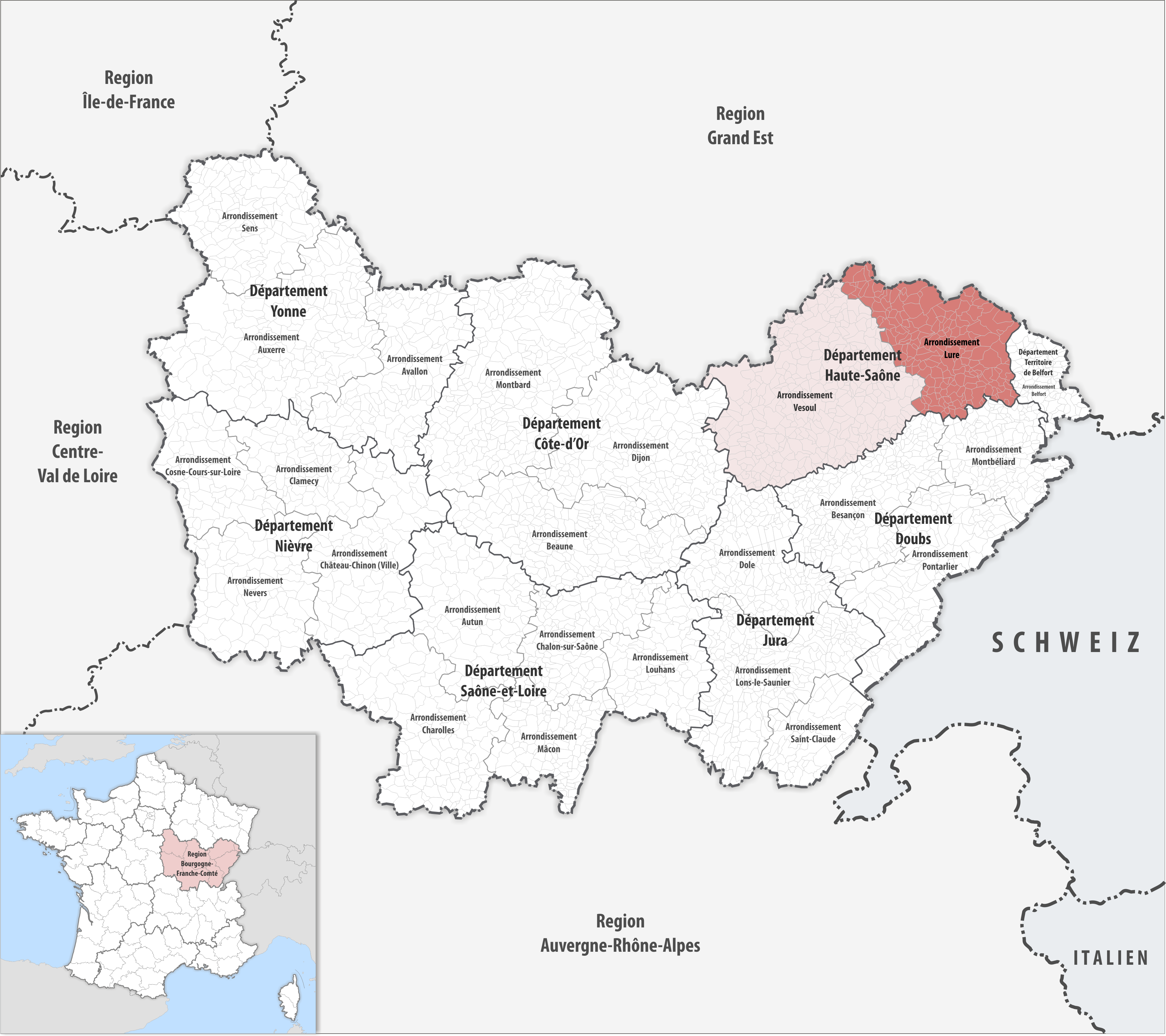
- Location within the region Bourgogne-Franche-Comté
- Country: France
- Region: Bourgogne-Franche-Comté
- Department: Haute-Saône
- No. of communes: {{{nbcomm}}}
- Area: 1,892.3 km^{2} (730.6 sq mi)
- Population (2023): 105,992
  - Density: 56.012/km^{2} (145.07/sq mi)
- INSEE code: 701

The arrondissement of Lure is an arrondissement of France in the Haute-Saône department in the Bourgogne-Franche-Comté region. It has 190 communes. Its population is 106,659 (2021), and its area is 1,892.3 km^{2} (730.6 sq mi).

== Composition ==
The communes of the arrondissement of Lure, and their INSEE codes, are:

1. Abelcourt (70001)
2. Adelans-et-le-Val-de-Bithaine (70004)
3. Aillevans (70005)
4. Aillevillers-et-Lyaumont (70006)
5. Ailloncourt (70007)
6. Ainvelle (70008)
7. Alaincourt (70010)
8. Amage (70011)
9. Ambiévillers (70013)
10. Amblans-et-Velotte (70014)
11. Amont-et-Effreney (70016)
12. Andornay (70021)
13. Anjeux (70023)
14. Arpenans (70029)
15. Athesans-Étroitefontaine (70031)
16. Autrey-le-Vay (70042)
17. Les Aynans (70046)
18. La Basse-Vaivre (70051)
19. Bassigney (70052)
20. Baudoncourt (70055)
21. Belfahy (70061)
22. Belles-Fontaines (70180)
23. Belmont (70062)
24. Belonchamp (70063)
25. Belverne (70064)
26. Betoncourt-lès-Brotte (70067)
27. Betoncourt-Saint-Pancras (70069)
28. Beulotte-Saint-Laurent (70071)
29. Beveuge (70072)
30. Bouhans-lès-Lure (70081)
31. Bouligney (70083)
32. Breuches (70093)
33. Breuchotte (70094)
34. Brevilliers (70096)
35. Briaucourt (70097)
36. Brotte-lès-Luxeuil (70098)
37. La Bruyère (70103)
38. Chagey (70116)
39. Châlonvillars (70117)
40. Champagney (70120)
41. Champey (70121)
42. La Chapelle-lès-Luxeuil (70128)
43. Châteney (70140)
44. Châtenois (70141)
45. Chavanne (70147)
46. Chenebier (70149)
47. Citers (70155)
48. Clairegoutte (70157)
49. Coisevaux (70160)
50. Conflans-sur-Lanterne (70168)
51. Corbenay (70171)
52. La Corbière (70172)
53. Corravillers (70176)
54. La Côte (70178)
55. Courmont (70182)
56. Couthenans (70184)
57. La Creuse (70186)
58. Crevans-et-la-Chapelle-lès-Granges (70187)
59. Creveney (70188)
60. Cuve (70194)
61. Dambenoît-lès-Colombe (70195)
62. Dampierre-lès-Conflans (70196)
63. Dampvalley-Saint-Pancras (70200)
64. Demangevelle (70202)
65. Échavanne (70205)
66. Échenans-sous-Mont-Vaudois (70206)
67. Écromagny (70210)
68. Éhuns (70213)
69. Errevet (70215)
70. Esboz-Brest (70216)
71. Esmoulières (70217)
72. Esprels (70219)
73. Étobon (70221)
74. Fallon (70226)
75. Faucogney-et-la-Mer (70227)
76. Faymont (70229)
77. Les Fessey (70233)
78. Fleurey-lès-Saint-Loup (70238)
79. Fontaine-lès-Luxeuil (70240)
80. Fontenois-la-Ville (70242)
81. Fougerolles-Saint-Valbert (70245)
82. Frahier-et-Chatebier (70248)
83. Francalmont (70249)
84. Franchevelle (70250)
85. Frédéric-Fontaine (70254)
86. Fresse (70256)
87. Froideconche (70258)
88. Froideterre (70259)
89. Frotey-lès-Lure (70260)
90. Genevreuille (70262)
91. Genevrey (70263)
92. Girefontaine (70269)
93. Gouhenans (70271)
94. Grammont (70273)
95. Granges-la-Ville (70276)
96. Granges-le-Bourg (70277)
97. Haut-du-Them-Château-Lambert (70283)
98. Hautevelle (70284)
99. Héricourt (70285)
100. Hurecourt (70287)
101. Jasney (70290)
102. Lantenot (70294)
103. La Lanterne-et-les-Armonts (70295)
104. Linexert (70304)
105. Lomont (70306)
106. Longevelle (70307)
107. La Longine (70308)
108. Lure (70310)
109. Luxeuil-les-Bains (70311)
110. Luze (70312)
111. Lyoffans (70313)
112. Magnivray (70314)
113. Magnoncourt (70315)
114. Les Magny (70317)
115. Magny-Danigon (70318)
116. Magny-Jobert (70319)
117. Magny-Vernois (70321)
118. Mailleroncourt-Charette (70322)
119. Mailleroncourt-Saint-Pancras (70323)
120. Malbouhans (70328)
121. Mandrevillars (70330)
122. Marast (70332)
123. Mélecey (70336)
124. Melincourt (70338)
125. Mélisey (70339)
126. Meurcourt (70344)
127. Mignavillers (70347)
128. Moffans-et-Vacheresse (70348)
129. Moimay (70349)
130. Mollans (70351)
131. La Montagne (70352)
132. Montdoré (70360)
133. Montessaux (70361)
134. La Neuvelle-lès-Lure (70385)
135. Oppenans (70395)
136. Oricourt (70396)
137. Ormoiche (70398)
138. Palante (70403)
139. Passavant-la-Rochère (70404)
140. La Pisseure (70411)
141. Plainemont (70412)
142. Plancher-Bas (70413)
143. Plancher-les-Mines (70414)
144. Pomoy (70416)
145. Pont-du-Bois (70419)
146. Pont-sur-l'Ognon (70420)
147. La Proiselière-et-Langle (70425)
148. Quers (70432)
149. Raddon-et-Chapendu (70435)
150. Rignovelle (70445)
151. Ronchamp (70451)
152. La Rosière (70453)
153. Roye (70455)
154. Saint-Barthélemy (70459)
155. Saint-Bresson (70460)
156. Sainte-Marie-en-Chanois (70469)
157. Sainte-Marie-en-Chaux (70470)
158. Saint-Ferjeux (70462)
159. Saint-Germain (70464)
160. Saint-Loup-sur-Semouse (70467)
161. Saint-Sauveur (70473)
162. Saint-Sulpice (70474)
163. Saulnot (70477)
164. Saulx (70478)
165. Secenans (70484)
166. Selles (70485)
167. Senargent-Mignafans (70487)
168. Servance-Miellin (70489)
169. Servigney (70490)
170. Ternuay-Melay-et-Saint-Hilaire (70498)
171. Trémoins (70506)
172. La Vaivre (70512)
173. Le Val-de-Gouhenans (70515)
174. Vauvillers (70526)
175. Velleminfroy (70537)
176. Velorcey (70541)
177. La Vergenne (70544)
178. Verlans (70547)
179. Villafans (70552)
180. Villargent (70553)
181. La Villedieu-en-Fontenette (70555)
182. Villersexel (70561)
183. Villers-la-Ville (70562)
184. Villers-lès-Luxeuil (70564)
185. Villers-sur-Saulnot (70567)
186. Visoncourt (70571)
187. La Voivre (70573)
188. Vouhenans (70577)
189. Vyans-le-Val (70579)
190. Vy-lès-Lure (70581)

== History ==
The arrondissement of Lure was created in 1800. In January 2017 it gained five communes from the arrondissement of Vesoul, and it lost three communes to the arrondissement of Vesoul.

As a result of the reorganisation of the cantons of France which came into effect in 2015, the borders of the cantons are no longer related to the borders of the arrondissements. The cantons of the arrondissement of Lure were, as of January 2015:

1. Champagney
2. Faucogney-et-la-Mer
3. Héricourt-Est
4. Héricourt-Ouest
5. Lure-Nord
6. Lure-Sud
7. Luxeuil-les-Bains
8. Mélisey
9. Saint-Loup-sur-Semouse
10. Saint-Sauveur
11. Saulx
12. Vauvillers
13. Villersexel
