= Ternuay-Melay-et-Saint-Hilaire =

- Commune
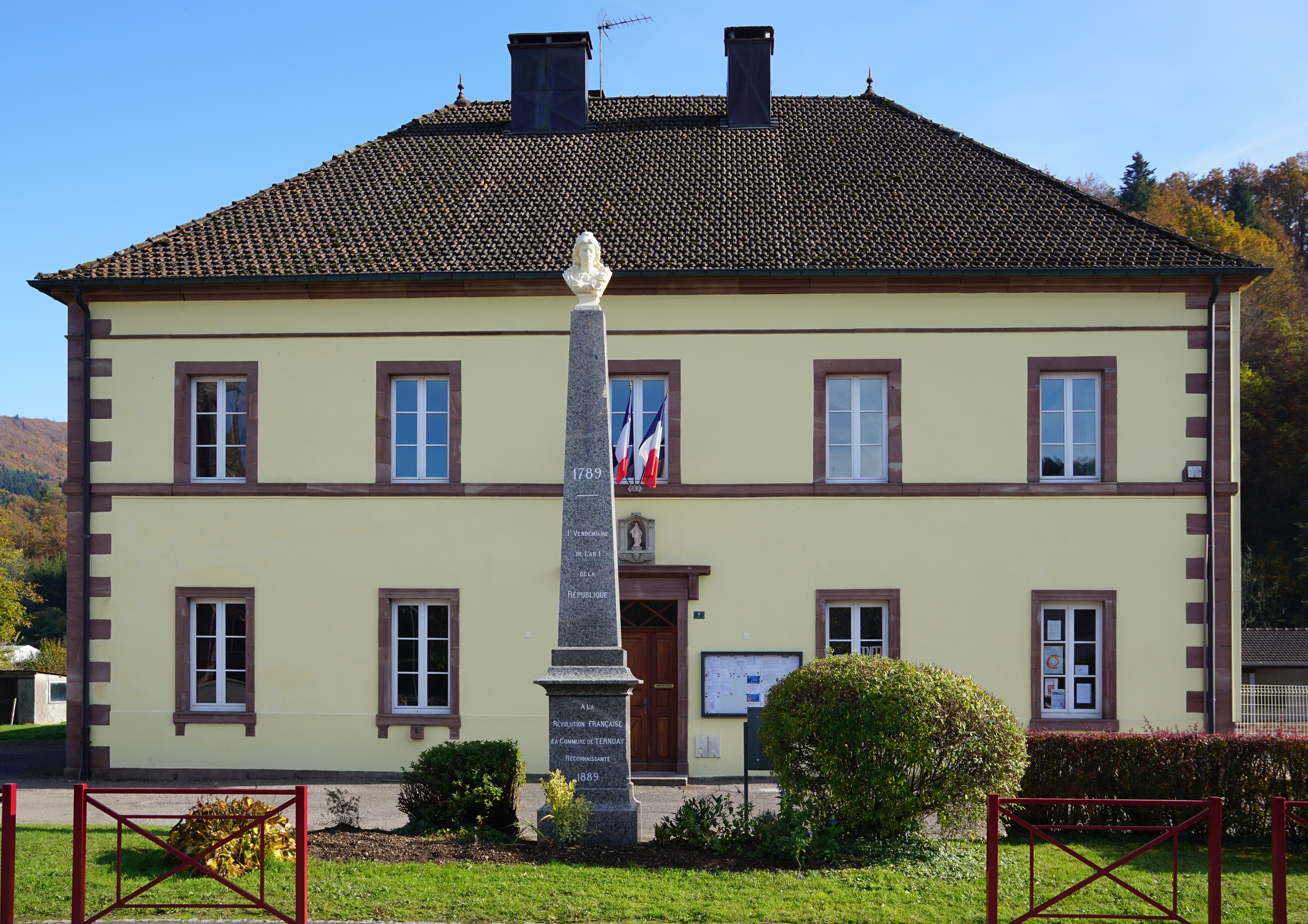
- The town hall in Ternuay

- Coat of arms
- Location of Ternuay-Melay-et-Saint-Hilaire
- Location within France Location within Bourgogne-Franche-Comté
- Coordinates: 47°47′09″N 6°37′47″E
- Country: France
- Region: Bourgogne-Franche-Comté
- Department: Haute-Saône
- Arrondissement: Lure
- Canton: Mélisey

Government
  - Mayor (2020–2026): Philippe Grosjean
- Area^{1}: 25.74 km^{2} (9.94 sq mi)
- Highest elevation: 870 m (2,850 ft)
- Lowest elevation: 345 m (1,132 ft)
- Population (2023): 438
  - Density: 17.0/km^{2} (44.1/sq mi)
- Time zone: UTC+01:00 (CET)
  - Summer (DST): UTC+02:00 (CEST)
- INSEE/Postal code: 70498 /70270
- ^{1} French Land Register data, which excludes lakes, ponds, glaciers > 1 km^{2} (0.386 sq mi or 247 acres) and river estuaries.

Ternuay-Melay-et-Saint-Hilaire (French pronunciation: [tɛʁnɥɛ məlɛ e sɛ̃.t‿ilɛʁ]) is a commune in the Haute-Saône department in the region of Bourgogne-Franche-Comté in eastern France.

Ternuay lies on the D486 running north from Lure to le Tillot. Together with the villages of Melay and St Hilaire it forms a commune lying between that of Melisey and Sevrance. There is one restaurant, a branch of the post office by the bridge over the river Ognon, a mobile wood-fired pizza truck that operates by the church regularly. The fountain serves water from the St-Hilaire spring.

Before the end of the commune going north, there is a turn to the right marked "Monument," leading up just over 3 km to the site of a Nazi reprisal against resistance fighters during WW2 in which five locals were murdered and 10 houses burned.

One burned farmhouse that was restored in 1955 neighbours the old schoolhouse where the resistance had been using when the murderous attack took place. Now known as "Folleterre," the farmhouse is the home of the Eurofaeries, and is owned by association les Amis de Folleterre.

At the beginning of August, a commemorative service is held, with a public Mass at the monument. Regional senators attend from as far away as Epinal.
