= Saint-Bresson, Haute-Saône =

Saint-Bresson
- Commune
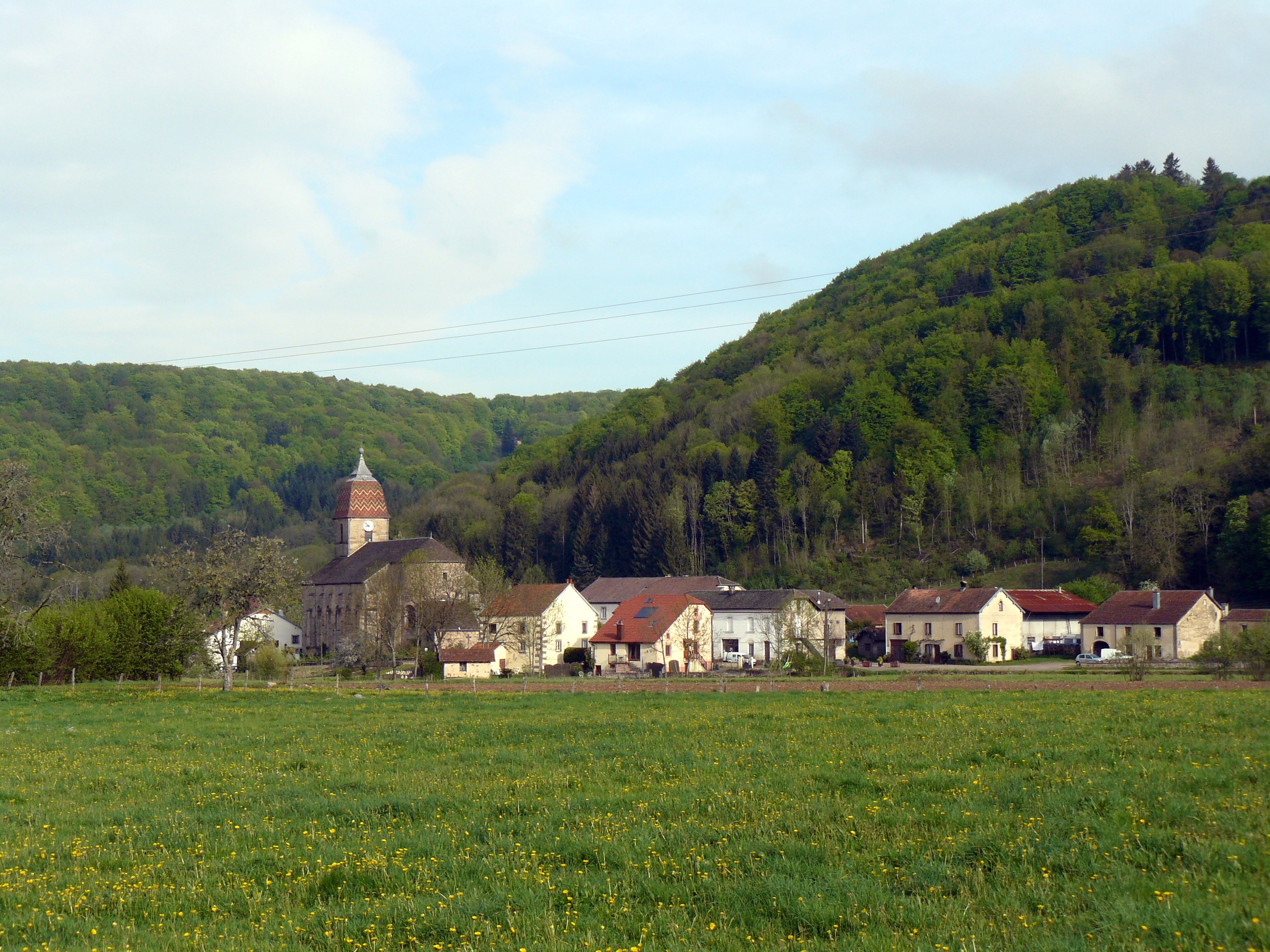
- A general view of Saint-Bresson
- Location of Saint-Bresson
- Location within France Location within Bourgogne-Franche-Comté
- Coordinates: 47°52′16″N 6°30′26″E
- Country: France
- Region: Bourgogne-Franche-Comté
- Department: Haute-Saône
- Arrondissement: Lure
- Canton: Mélisey

Government
  - Mayor (2020–2026): André Dirand
- Area^{1}: 26.60 km^{2} (10.27 sq mi)
- Highest elevation: 710 m (2,330 ft)
- Lowest elevation: 379 m (1,243 ft)
- Population (2023): 417
  - Density: 15.7/km^{2} (40.6/sq mi)
- Time zone: UTC+01:00 (CET)
  - Summer (DST): UTC+02:00 (CEST)
- INSEE/Postal code: 70460 /70280
- ^{1} French Land Register data, which excludes lakes, ponds, glaciers > 1 km^{2} (0.386 sq mi or 247 acres) and river estuaries.

Saint-Bresson (French pronunciation: [sɛ̃ bʁɛsɔ̃]) is a commune in the Haute-Saône department in the region of Bourgogne-Franche-Comté in eastern France.

== See also ==
- Communes of the Haute-Saône department
