= Mélisey, Haute-Saône =

Mélisey
- Commune
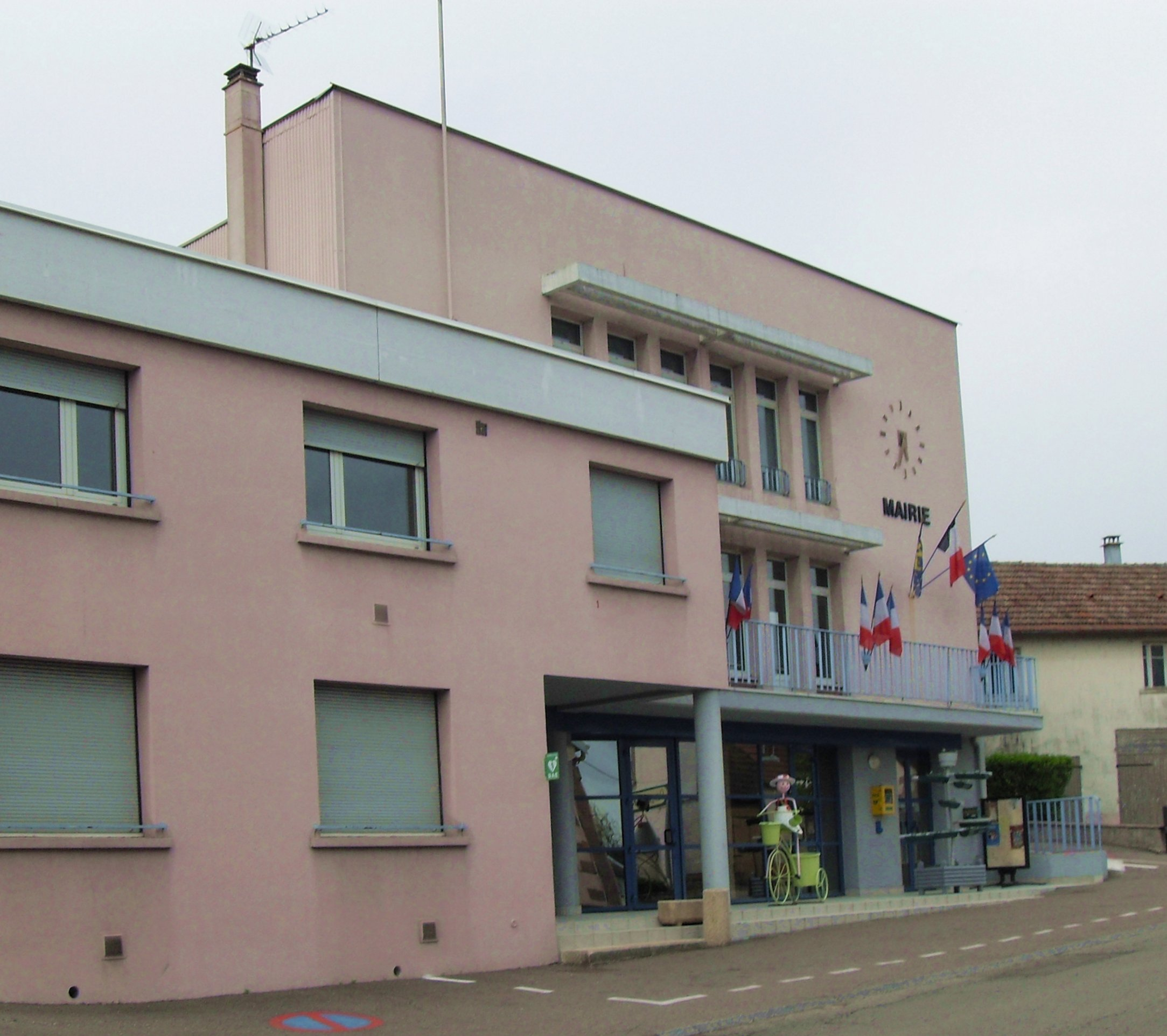
- The town hall in Mélisey
- Location of Mélisey
- Location within France Location within Bourgogne-Franche-Comté
- Coordinates: 47°45′14″N 6°34′51″E
- Country: France
- Region: Bourgogne-Franche-Comté
- Department: Haute-Saône
- Arrondissement: Lure
- Canton: Mélisey

Government
  - Mayor (2020–2026): Régis Pinot
- Area^{1}: 20.67 km^{2} (7.98 sq mi)
- Highest elevation: 470 m (1,540 ft)
- Lowest elevation: 322 m (1,056 ft)
- Population (2023): 1,625
  - Density: 78.62/km^{2} (203.6/sq mi)
- Time zone: UTC+01:00 (CET)
  - Summer (DST): UTC+02:00 (CEST)
- INSEE/Postal code: 70339 /70270
- ^{1} French Land Register data, which excludes lakes, ponds, glaciers > 1 km^{2} (0.386 sq mi or 247 acres) and river estuaries.

Mélisey (French pronunciation: [melizɛ]) is a commune in the Haute-Saône department in the region of Bourgogne-Franche-Comté in eastern France.

== Geography ==
The area of Mélisey is 20.7 km^{2}, the population density is 81 inhabitants per km^{2}.

== See also ==
- Communes of the Haute-Saône department

== Notable people ==
- Thibaut Pinot, professional cyclist for FDJ
