= Magnivray =

- Commune
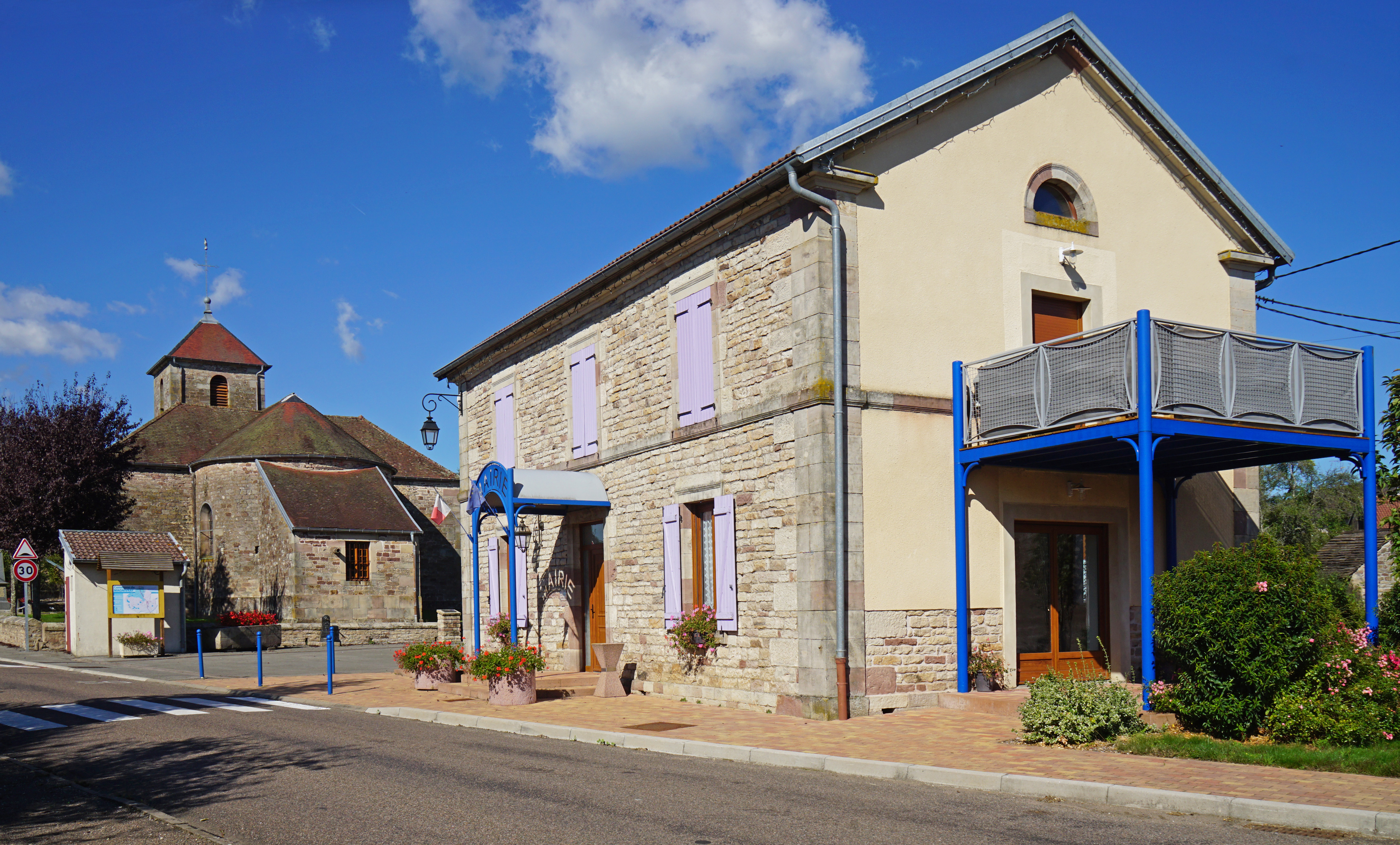
- The town hall and church in Magnivray
- Location of Magnivray
- Location within France Location within Bourgogne-Franche-Comté
- Coordinates: 47°46′54″N 6°28′16″E
- Country: France
- Region: Bourgogne-Franche-Comté
- Department: Haute-Saône
- Arrondissement: Lure
- Canton: Mélisey

Government
  - Mayor (2020–2026): Christian Chamagne
- Area^{1}: 4.76 km^{2} (1.84 sq mi)
- Highest elevation: 361 m (1,184 ft)
- Lowest elevation: 294 m (965 ft)
- Population (2023): 162
  - Density: 34.0/km^{2} (88.1/sq mi)
- Time zone: UTC+01:00 (CET)
  - Summer (DST): UTC+02:00 (CEST)
- INSEE/Postal code: 70314 /70300
- ^{1} French Land Register data, which excludes lakes, ponds, glaciers > 1 km^{2} (0.386 sq mi or 247 acres) and river estuaries.

Magnivray (French pronunciation: [maɲivʁɛ]) is a commune in the Haute-Saône department in the region of Bourgogne-Franche-Comté in eastern France.

== See also ==
- Communes of the Haute-Saône department
