= La Corbière, Haute-Saône =

La Corbière
- Commune
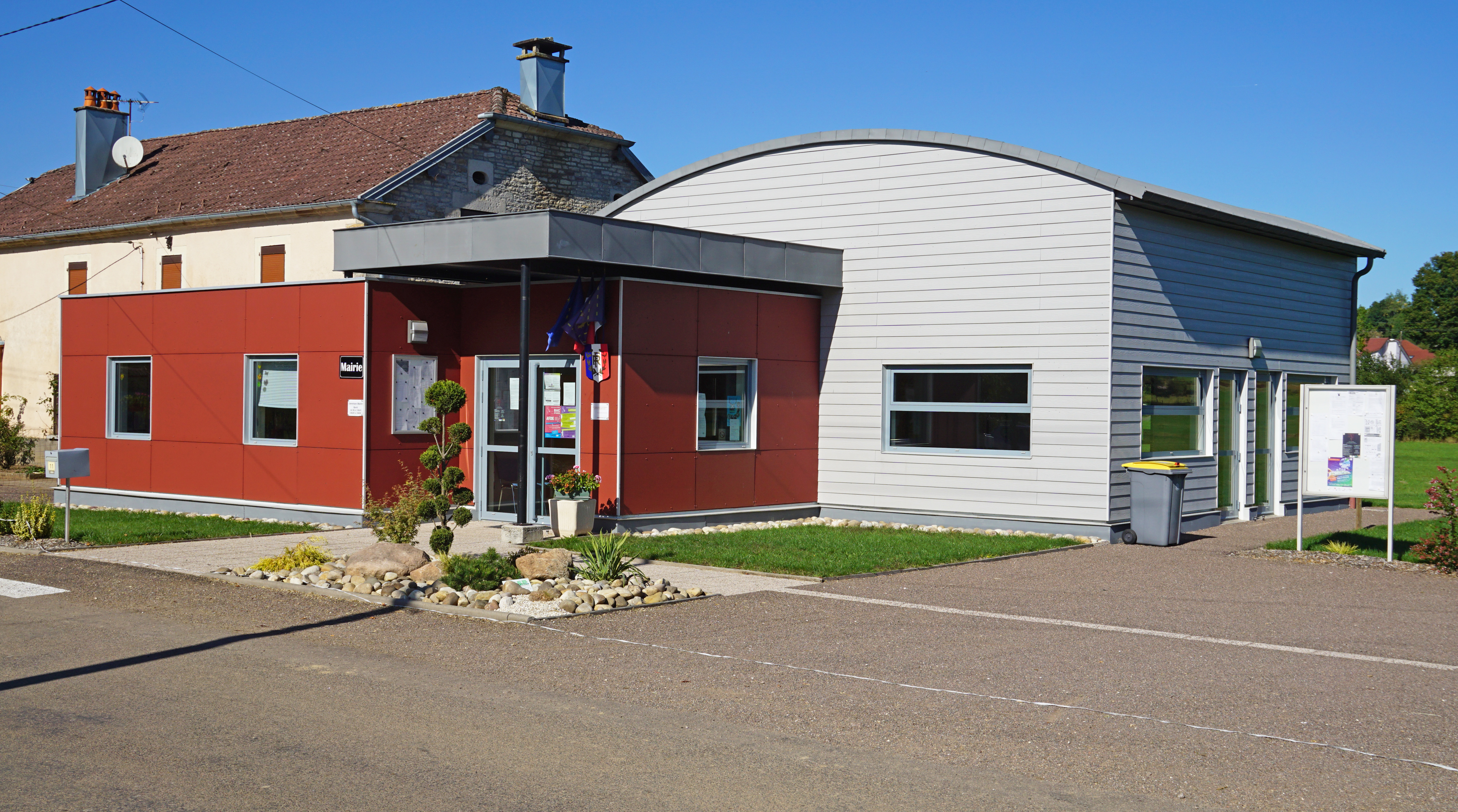
- The town hall in La Corbière
- Location of La Corbière
- Location within France Location within Bourgogne-Franche-Comté
- Coordinates: 47°47′35″N 6°29′30″E
- Country: France
- Region: Bourgogne-Franche-Comté
- Department: Haute-Saône
- Arrondissement: Lure
- Canton: Mélisey

Government
  - Mayor (2020–2026): Sébastien Richardot
- Area^{1}: 3.15 km^{2} (1.22 sq mi)
- Highest elevation: 421 m (1,381 ft)
- Lowest elevation: 338 m (1,109 ft)
- Population (2023): 112
  - Density: 35.6/km^{2} (92.1/sq mi)
- Time zone: UTC+01:00 (CET)
  - Summer (DST): UTC+02:00 (CEST)
- INSEE/Postal code: 70172 /70300
- ^{1} French Land Register data, which excludes lakes, ponds, glaciers > 1 km^{2} (0.386 sq mi or 247 acres) and river estuaries.

La Corbière (French pronunciation: [la kɔʁbjɛʁ]) is a commune in the Haute-Saône department in the region of Bourgogne-Franche-Comté in eastern France.

== See also ==
- Communes of the Haute-Saône department
