= Beulotte-Saint-Laurent =

- Commune
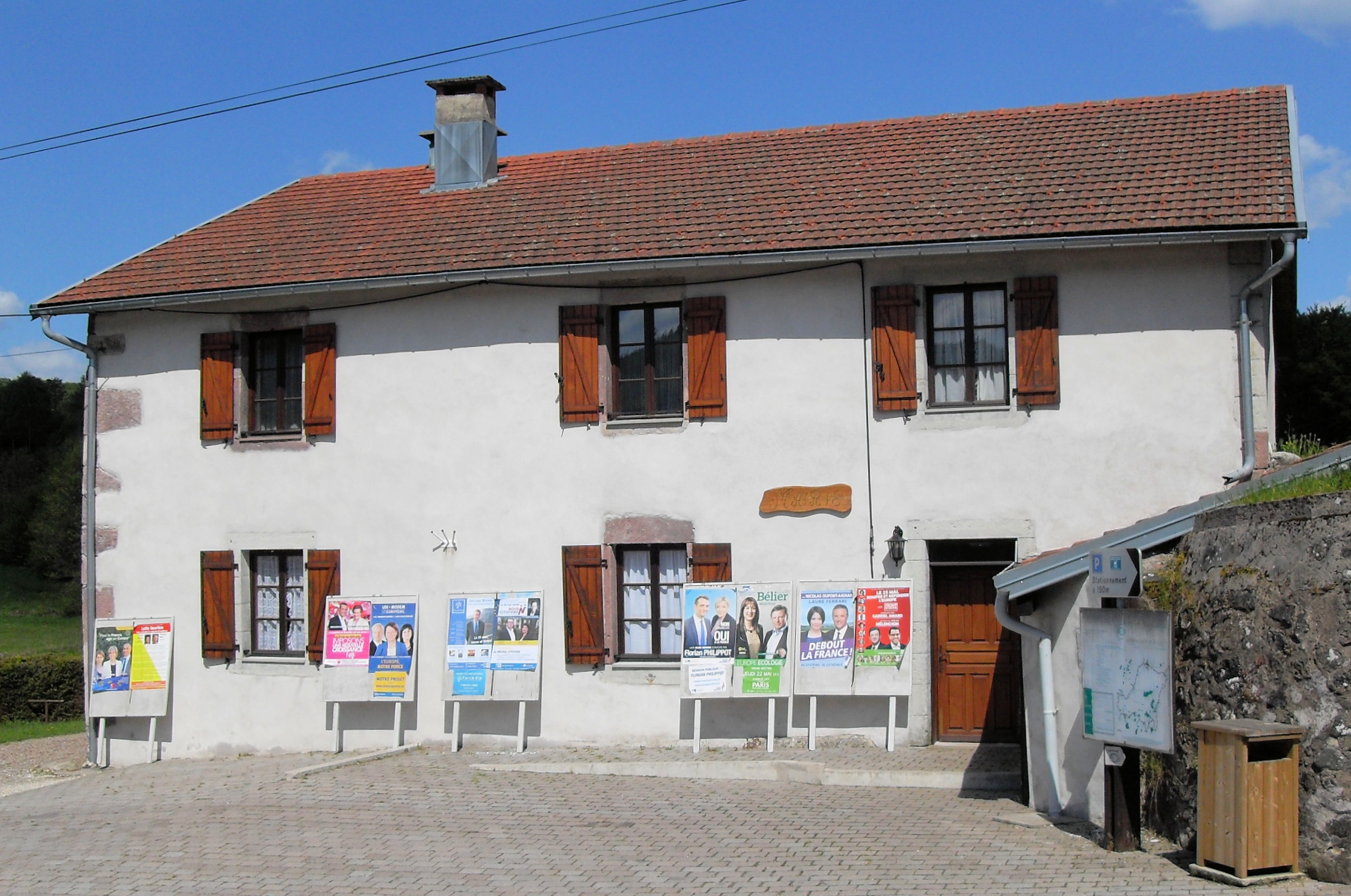
- The town hall in Beulotte-Saint-Laurent
- Location of Beulotte-Saint-Laurent
- Location within France Location within Bourgogne-Franche-Comté
- Coordinates: 47°51′41″N 6°40′42″E
- Country: France
- Region: Bourgogne-Franche-Comté
- Department: Haute-Saône
- Arrondissement: Lure
- Canton: Mélisey

Government
  - Mayor (2020–2026): Jean-Charles Henry
- Area^{1}: 14.20 km^{2} (5.48 sq mi)
- Highest elevation: 757 m (2,484 ft)
- Lowest elevation: 520 m (1,710 ft)
- Population (2023): 62
  - Density: 4.4/km^{2} (11/sq mi)
- Time zone: UTC+01:00 (CET)
  - Summer (DST): UTC+02:00 (CEST)
- INSEE/Postal code: 70071 /70310
- ^{1} French Land Register data, which excludes lakes, ponds, glaciers > 1 km^{2} (0.386 sq mi or 247 acres) and river estuaries.

Beulotte-Saint-Laurent (French pronunciation: [bœlɔt sɛ̃ lɔʁɑ̃]) is a commune in the Haute-Saône department in the region of Bourgogne-Franche-Comté in eastern France.

== See also ==
- Communes of the Haute-Saône department
