= Sainte-Marie-en-Chanois =

- Commune
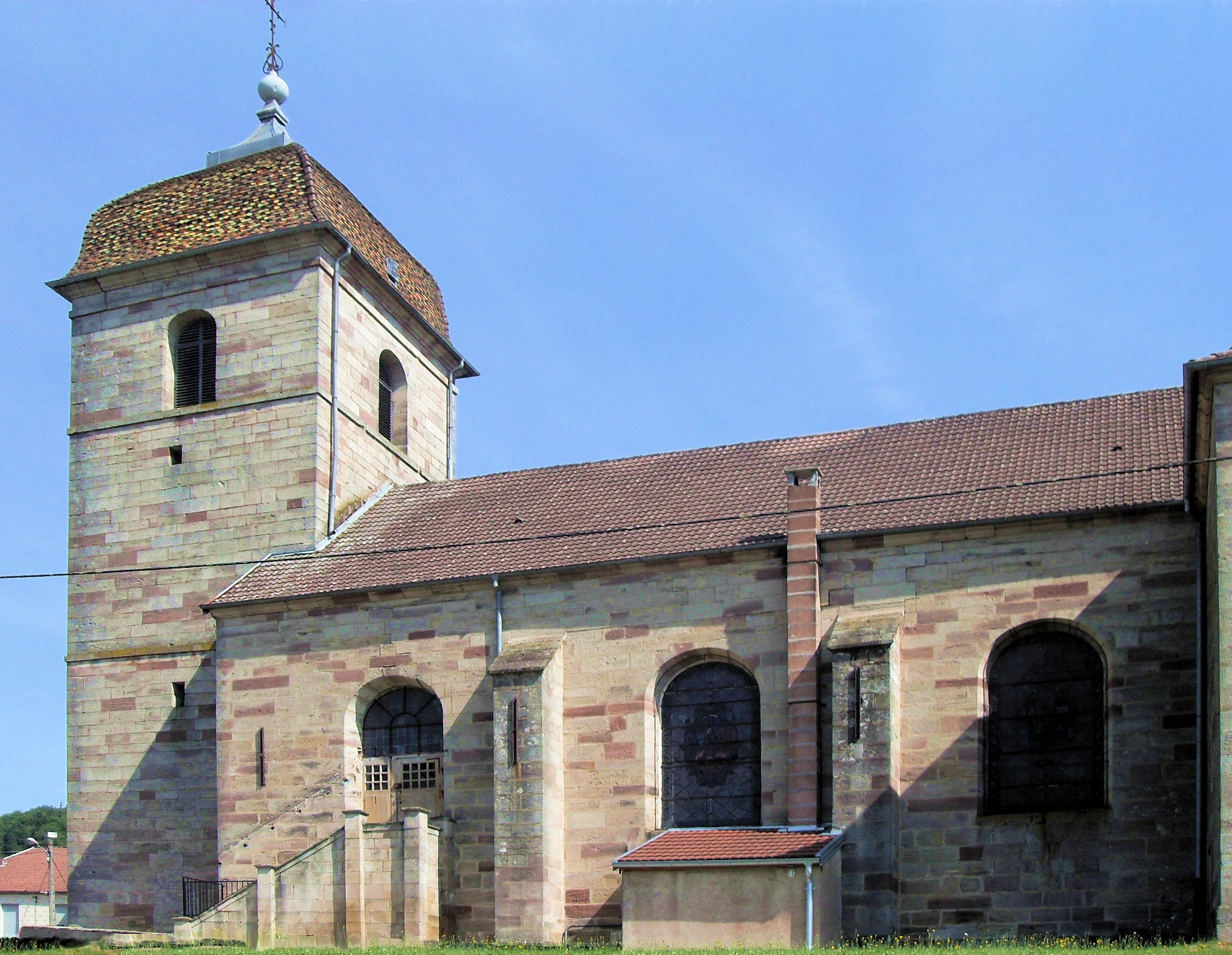
- The church in Sainte-Marie-en-Chanois

- Coat of arms
- Location of Sainte-Marie-en-Chanois
- Location within France Location within Bourgogne-Franche-Comté
- Coordinates: 47°50′02″N 6°30′46″E
- Country: France
- Region: Bourgogne-Franche-Comté
- Department: Haute-Saône
- Arrondissement: Lure
- Canton: Mélisey
- Area^{1}: 4.79 km^{2} (1.85 sq mi)
- Highest elevation: 572 m (1,877 ft)
- Lowest elevation: 340 m (1,120 ft)
- Population (2023): 208
  - Density: 43.4/km^{2} (112/sq mi)
- Time zone: UTC+01:00 (CET)
  - Summer (DST): UTC+02:00 (CEST)
- INSEE/Postal code: 70469 /70310
- ^{1} French Land Register data, which excludes lakes, ponds, glaciers > 1 km^{2} (0.386 sq mi or 247 acres) and river estuaries.

Sainte-Marie-en-Chanois is a commune in the Haute-Saône department in the region of Bourgogne-Franche-Comté in eastern France.

== See also ==
- Communes of the Haute-Saône department
