= Raddon-et-Chapendu =

- Commune
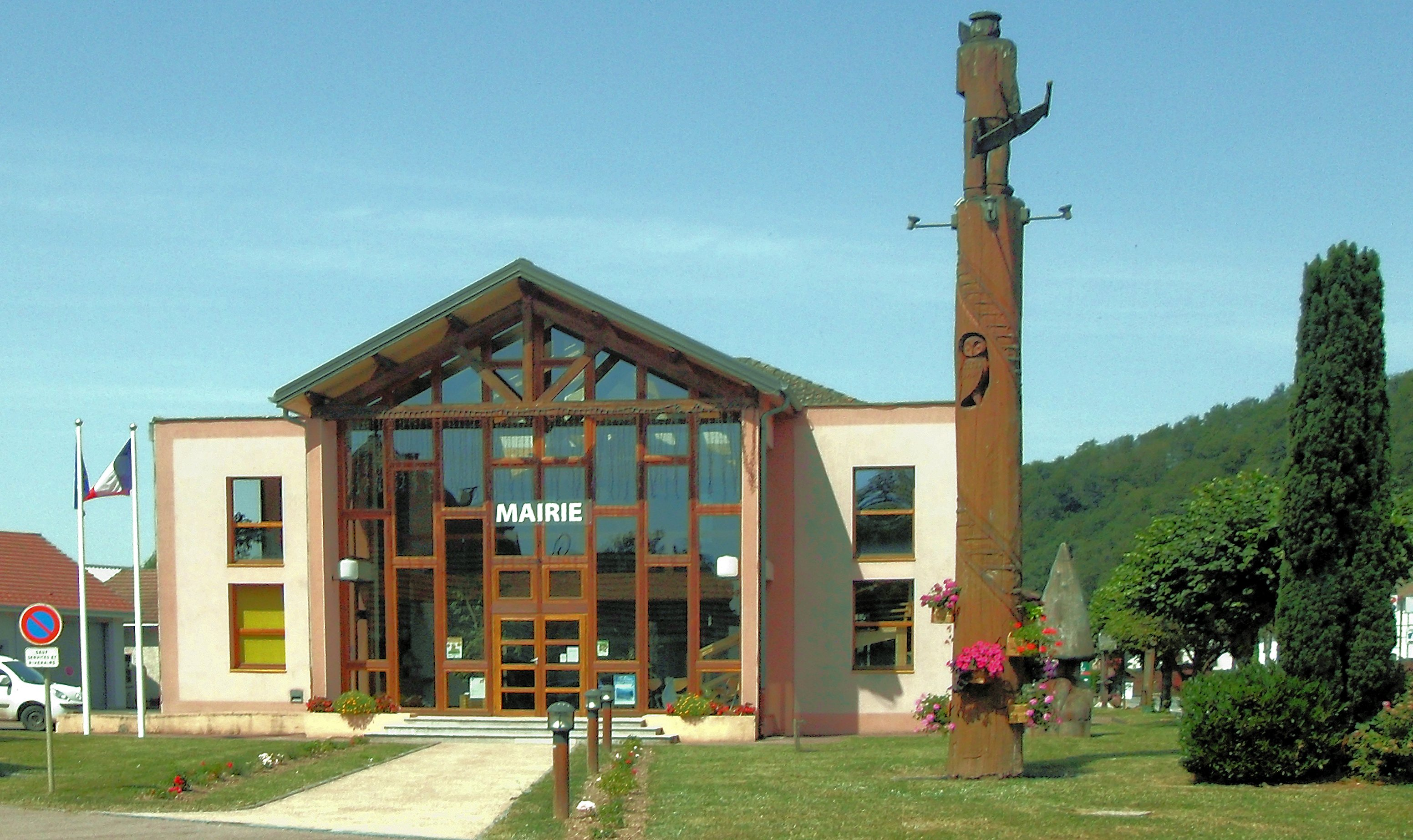
- The town hall in Raddon-et-Chapendu

- Coat of arms
- Location of Raddon-et-Chapendu
- Location within France Location within Bourgogne-Franche-Comté
- Coordinates: 47°50′33″N 6°28′19″E
- Country: France
- Region: Bourgogne-Franche-Comté
- Department: Haute-Saône
- Arrondissement: Lure
- Canton: Mélisey
- Intercommunality: Pays de Luxeuil

Government
  - Mayor (2020–2026): Joël Brice
- Area^{1}: 12.50 km^{2} (4.83 sq mi)
- Highest elevation: 497 m (1,631 ft)
- Lowest elevation: 319 m (1,047 ft)
- Population (2023): 849
  - Density: 67.9/km^{2} (176/sq mi)
- Time zone: UTC+01:00 (CET)
  - Summer (DST): UTC+02:00 (CEST)
- INSEE/Postal code: 70435 /70280
- ^{1} French Land Register data, which excludes lakes, ponds, glaciers > 1 km^{2} (0.386 sq mi or 247 acres) and river estuaries.

Raddon-et-Chapendu (French pronunciation: [ʁadɔ̃ e ʃapɑ̃dy]) is a commune in the Haute-Saône department in the region of Bourgogne-Franche-Comté in eastern France.

== Population ==
Historical population
Year	Pop.	±% p.a.
1968	822	—
1975	798	−0.42%
1982	779	−0.34%
1990	791	+0.19%
1999	835	+0.60%
2007	890	+0.80%
2012	953	+1.38%
2017	861	−2.01%
2023	849	−0.23%
Source: INSEE

== See also ==
- Communes of the Haute-Saône department
