= La Bruyère, Haute-Saône =

La Bruyère
- Commune
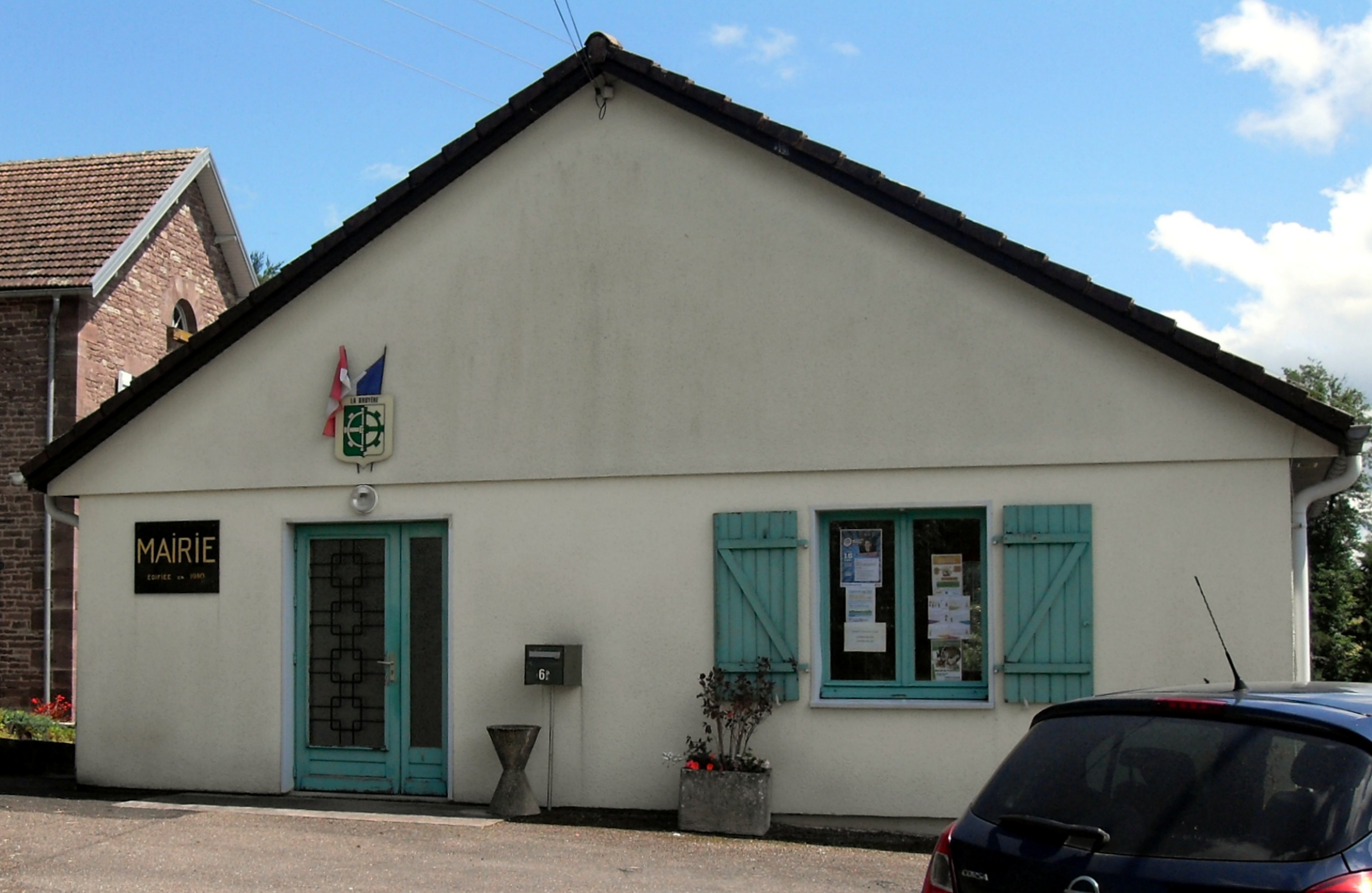
- The town hall in La Bruyère

- Coat of arms
- Location of La Bruyère
- Location within France Location within Bourgogne-Franche-Comté
- Coordinates: 47°49′53″N 6°29′07″E
- Country: France
- Region: Bourgogne-Franche-Comté
- Department: Haute-Saône
- Arrondissement: Lure
- Canton: Mélisey

Government
  - Mayor (2020–2026): Bernard Girard
- Area^{1}: 6.32 km^{2} (2.44 sq mi)
- Highest elevation: 426 m (1,398 ft)
- Lowest elevation: 309 m (1,014 ft)
- Population (2023): 163
  - Density: 25.8/km^{2} (66.8/sq mi)
- Time zone: UTC+01:00 (CET)
  - Summer (DST): UTC+02:00 (CEST)
- INSEE/Postal code: 70103 /70280
- ^{1} French Land Register data, which excludes lakes, ponds, glaciers > 1 km^{2} (0.386 sq mi or 247 acres) and river estuaries.

La Bruyère (French pronunciation: [la bʁɥijɛʁ]) is a commune in the Haute-Saône department in the region of Bourgogne-Franche-Comté, in eastern France.

It was the birthplace (1874) of Albert Mathiez, a prominent historian of the French Revolution, born to a very local innkeeper's family, who later moved to the city of Paris and achieved a successful academic career.

== See also ==
- Communes of the Haute-Saône department
