= Lantenot =

- Commune
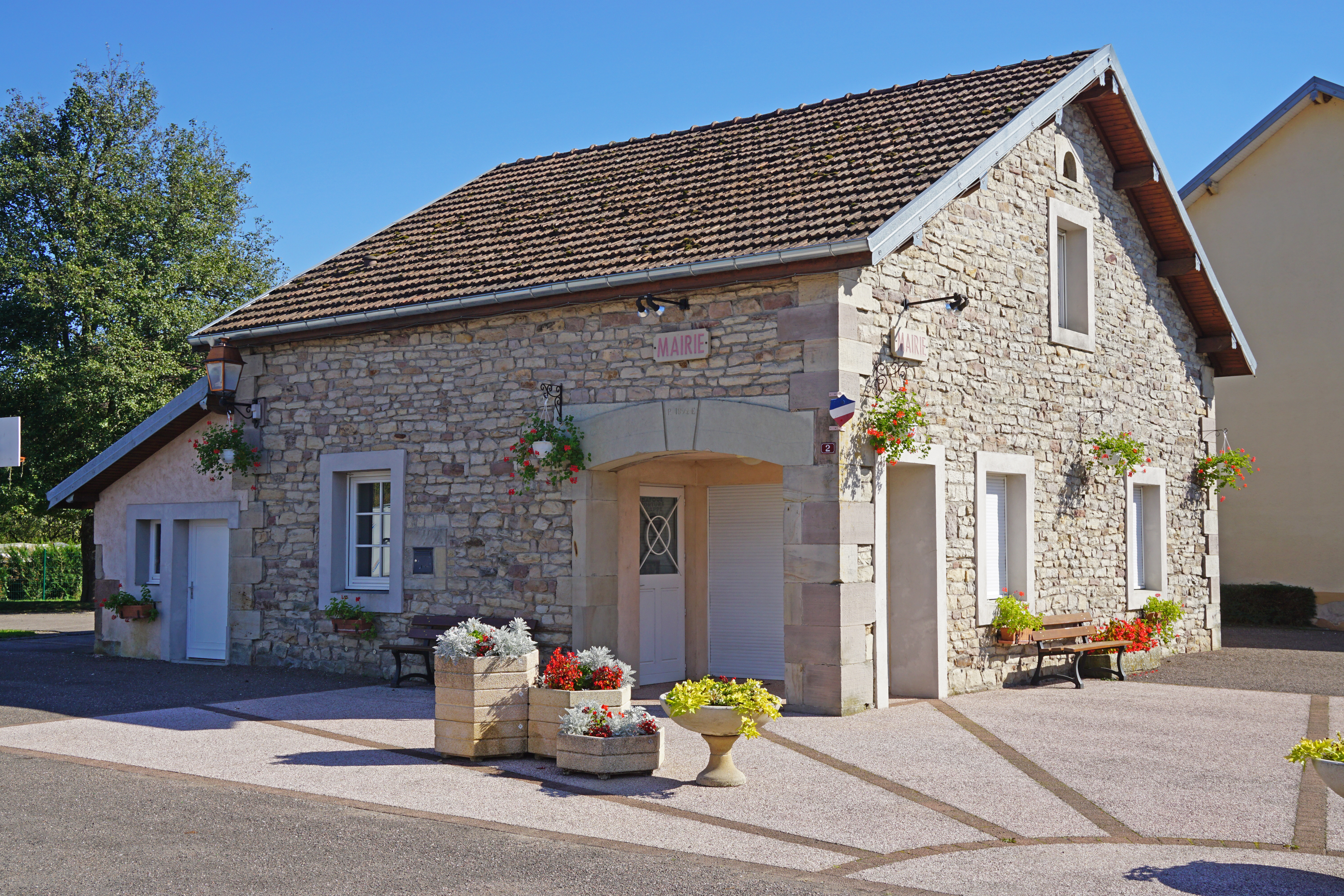
- The town hall in Lantenot

- Coat of arms
- Location of Lantenot
- Location within France Location within Bourgogne-Franche-Comté
- Coordinates: 47°45′01″N 6°29′47″E
- Country: France
- Region: Bourgogne-Franche-Comté
- Department: Haute-Saône
- Arrondissement: Lure
- Canton: Mélisey

Government
  - Mayor (2020–2026): David Balaud
- Area^{1}: 8.26 km^{2} (3.19 sq mi)
- Highest elevation: 431 m (1,414 ft)
- Lowest elevation: 207 m (679 ft)
- Population (2023): 369
  - Density: 44.7/km^{2} (116/sq mi)
- Time zone: UTC+01:00 (CET)
  - Summer (DST): UTC+02:00 (CEST)
- INSEE/Postal code: 70294 /70200
- ^{1} French Land Register data, which excludes lakes, ponds, glaciers > 1 km^{2} (0.386 sq mi or 247 acres) and river estuaries.

Lantenot (French pronunciation: [lɑ̃tno]) is a commune in the Haute-Saône department in the region of Bourgogne-Franche-Comté in eastern France.

== See also ==
- Communes of the Haute-Saône department
