= Saint-Barthélemy, Haute-Saône =

Saint-Barthélemy
- Commune
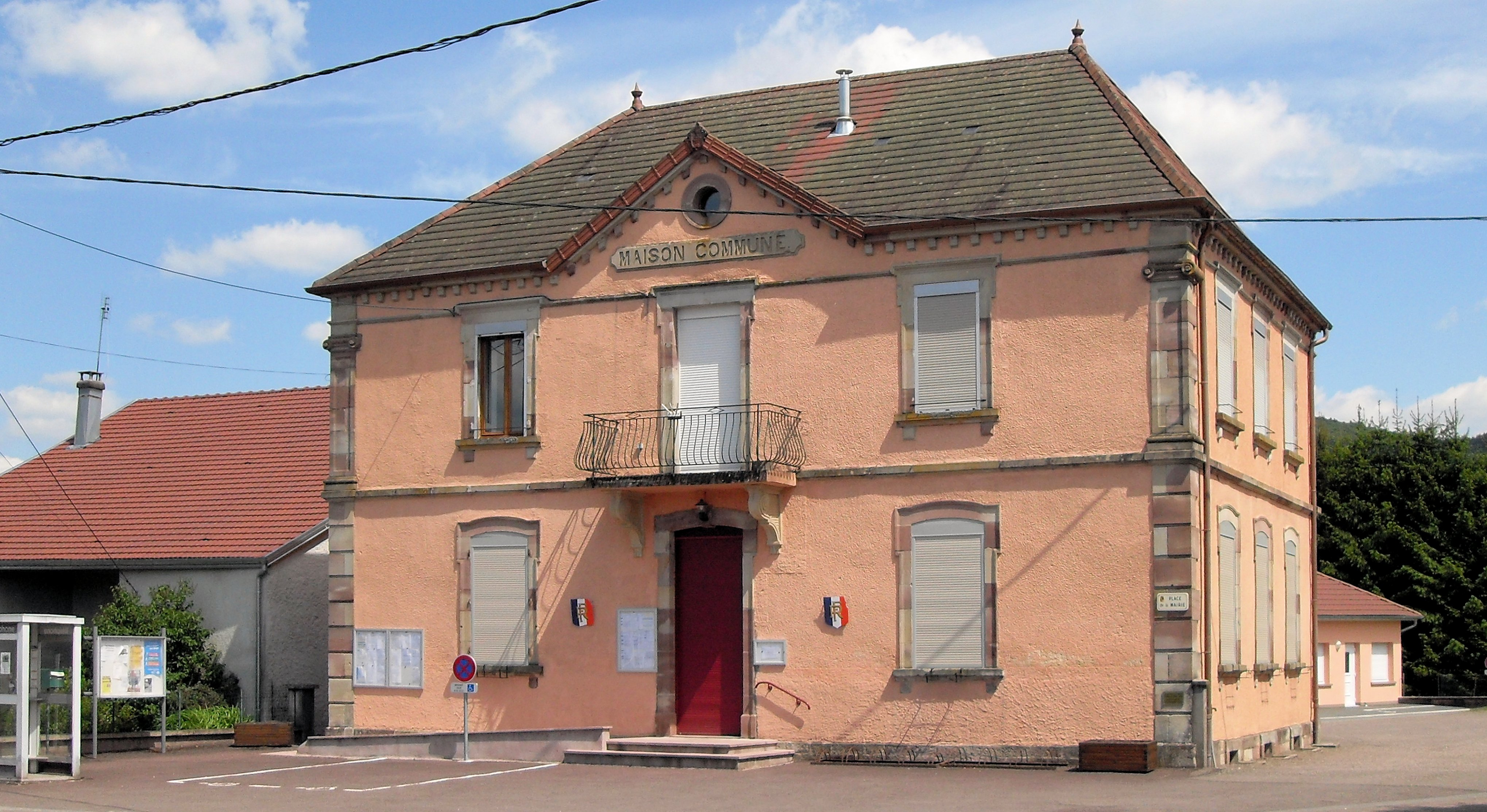
- The town hall in Saint-Barthélemy

- Coat of arms
- Location of Saint-Barthélemy
- Location within France Location within Bourgogne-Franche-Comté
- Coordinates: 47°45′00″N 6°35′20″E
- Country: France
- Region: Bourgogne-Franche-Comté
- Department: Haute-Saône
- Arrondissement: Lure
- Canton: Mélisey

Government
  - Mayor (2020–2026): Francis Oudot
- Area^{1}: 13.46 km^{2} (5.20 sq mi)
- Highest elevation: 708 m (2,323 ft)
- Lowest elevation: 324 m (1,063 ft)
- Population (2023): 1,085
  - Density: 80.61/km^{2} (208.8/sq mi)
- Time zone: UTC+01:00 (CET)
  - Summer (DST): UTC+02:00 (CEST)
- INSEE/Postal code: 70459 /70270
- ^{1} French Land Register data, which excludes lakes, ponds, glaciers > 1 km^{2} (0.386 sq mi or 247 acres) and river estuaries.

Saint-Barthélemy (French pronunciation: [sɛ̃ baʁtelemi]) is a commune in the Haute-Saône department in the region of Bourgogne-Franche-Comté in eastern France.

== See also ==
- Communes of the Haute-Saône department
