= Amont-et-Effreney =

- Commune
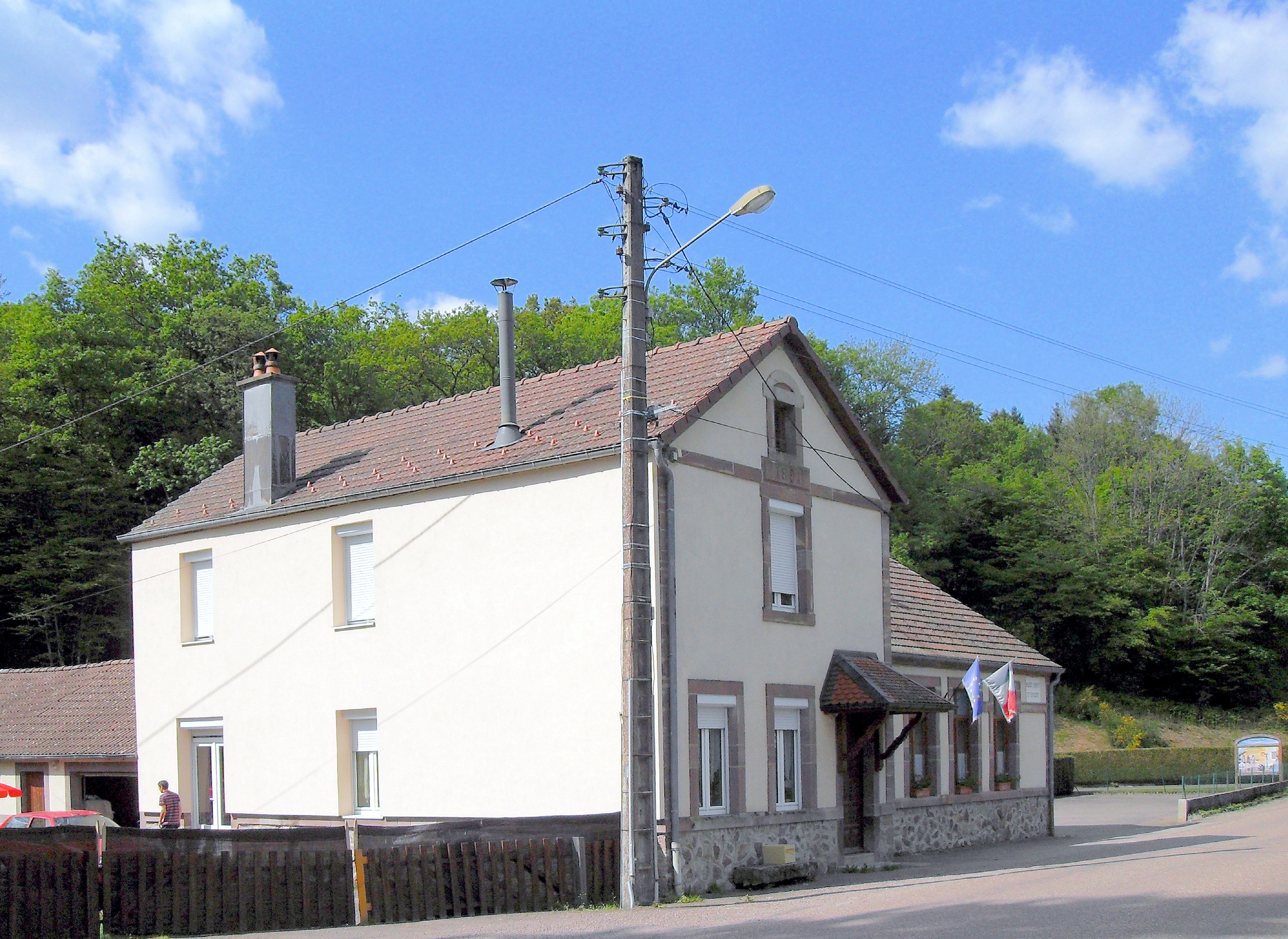
- The town hall in Amont-et-Effreney

- Coat of arms
- Location of Amont-et-Effreney
- Location within France Location within Bourgogne-Franche-Comté
- Coordinates: 47°52′34″N 6°34′32″E
- Country: France
- Region: Bourgogne-Franche-Comté
- Department: Haute-Saône
- Arrondissement: Lure
- Canton: Mélisey
- Intercommunality: Les Mille Etangs

Government
  - Mayor (2020–2026): François Grosjean
- Area^{1}: 16.83 km^{2} (6.50 sq mi)
- Highest elevation: 661 m (2,169 ft)
- Lowest elevation: 360 m (1,180 ft)
- Population (2023): 168
  - Density: 9.98/km^{2} (25.9/sq mi)
- Time zone: UTC+01:00 (CET)
  - Summer (DST): UTC+02:00 (CEST)
- INSEE/Postal code: 70016 /70310
- ^{1} French Land Register data, which excludes lakes, ponds, glaciers > 1 km^{2} (0.386 sq mi or 247 acres) and river estuaries.

Amont-et-Effreney (French pronunciation: [amɔ̃ e efʁənɛ]) is a commune in the Haute-Saône department in the region of Bourgogne-Franche-Comté in eastern France.

== See also ==
- Communes of the Haute-Saône department
