= Rignovelle =

- Commune
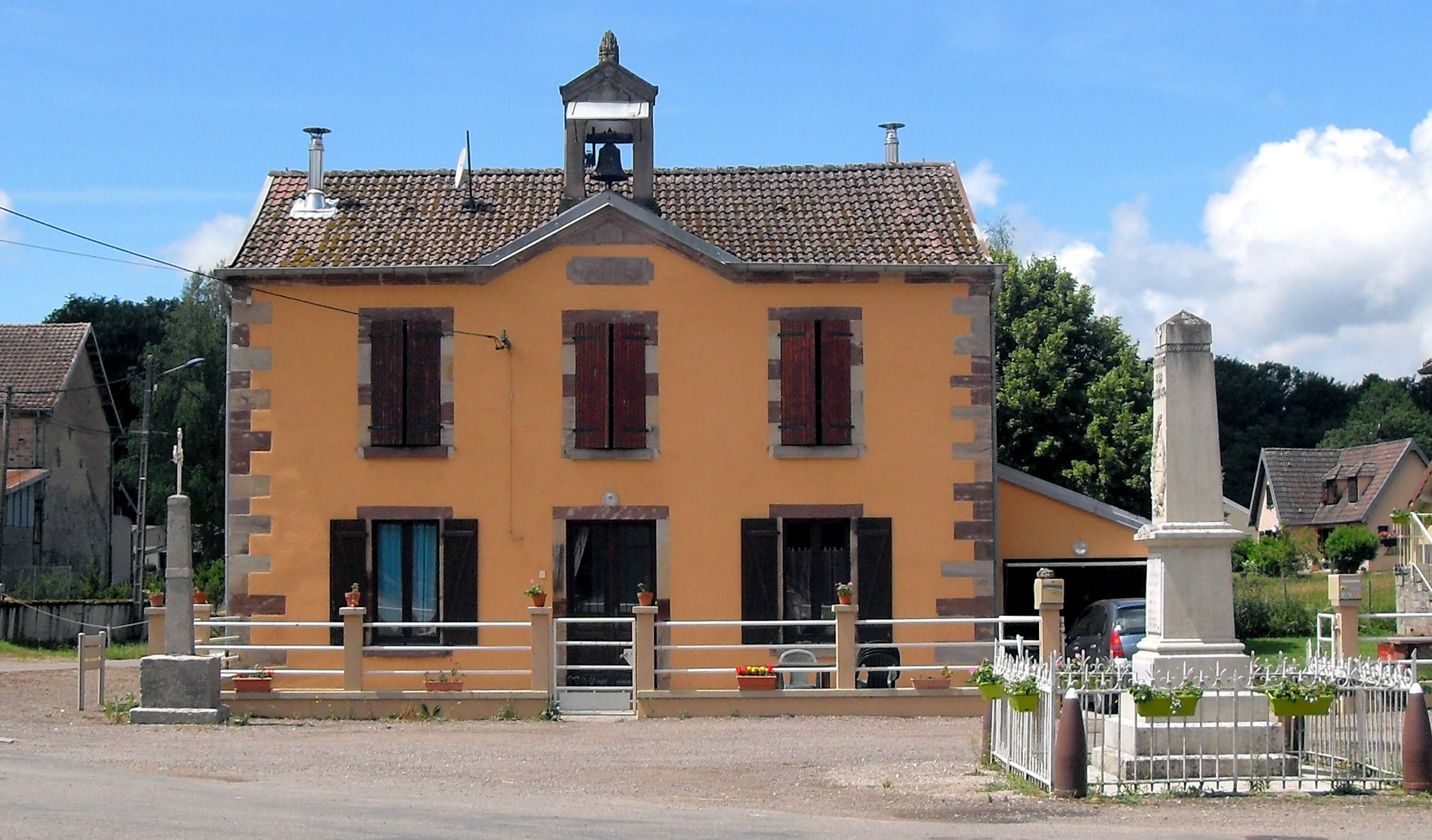
- The town hall in Rignovelle
- Location of Rignovelle
- Location within France Location within Bourgogne-Franche-Comté
- Coordinates: 47°45′55″N 6°28′54″E
- Country: France
- Region: Bourgogne-Franche-Comté
- Department: Haute-Saône
- Arrondissement: Lure
- Canton: Mélisey

Government
  - Mayor (2020–2026): René Robert
- Area^{1}: 4.37 km^{2} (1.69 sq mi)
- Highest elevation: 362 m (1,188 ft)
- Lowest elevation: 304 m (997 ft)
- Population (2023): 122
  - Density: 27.9/km^{2} (72.3/sq mi)
- Time zone: UTC+01:00 (CET)
  - Summer (DST): UTC+02:00 (CEST)
- INSEE/Postal code: 70445 /70200
- ^{1} French Land Register data, which excludes lakes, ponds, glaciers > 1 km^{2} (0.386 sq mi or 247 acres) and river estuaries.

Rignovelle (French pronunciation: [ʁiɲɔvɛl]) is a commune in the Haute-Saône department in the region of Bourgogne-Franche-Comté in eastern France.

== See also ==
- Communes of the Haute-Saône department
