= Les Fessey =

- Commune
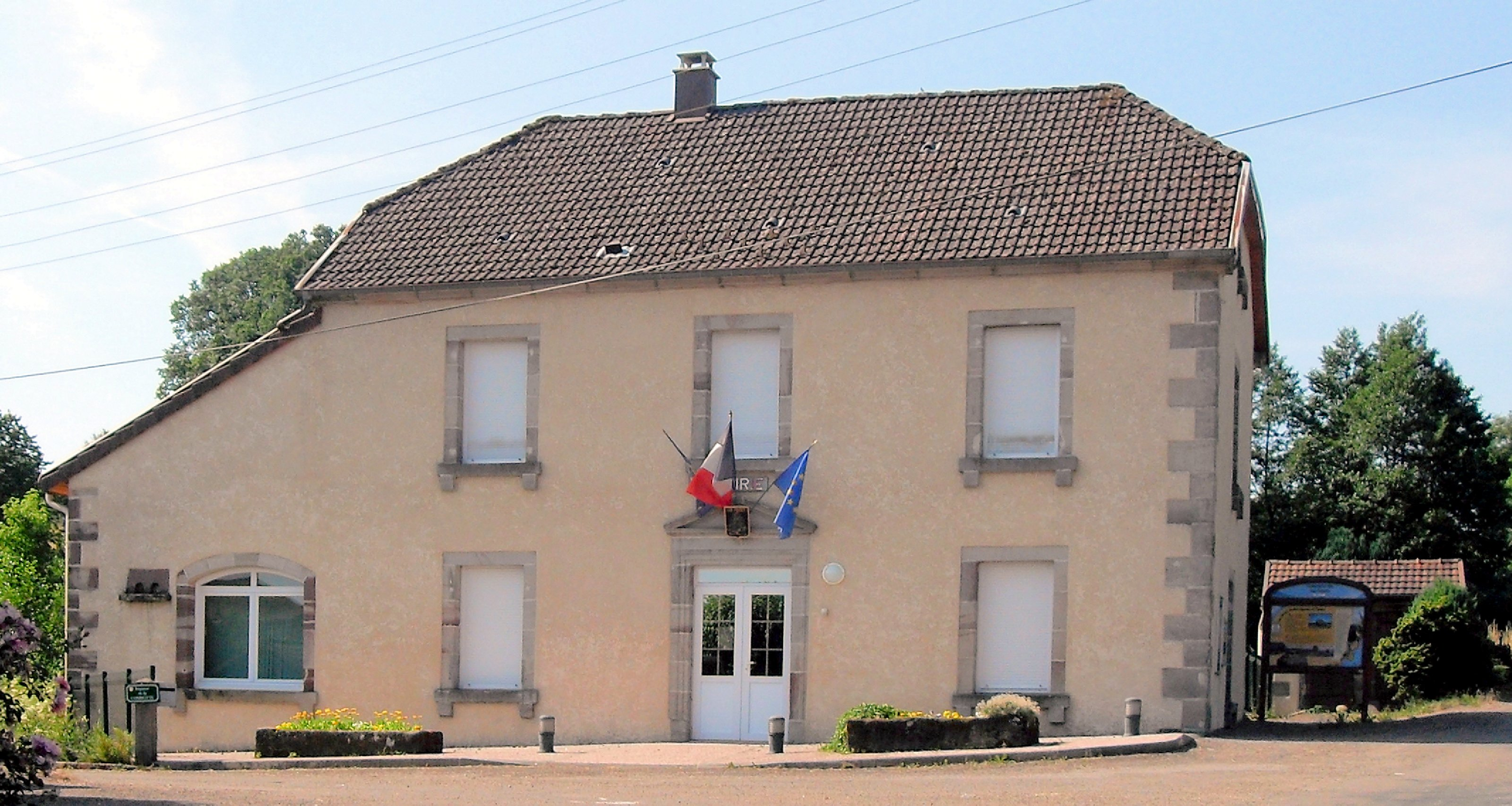
- The town hall in Les Fessey

- Coat of arms
- Location of Les Fessey
- Location within France Location within Bourgogne-Franche-Comté
- Coordinates: 47°49′15″N 6°31′07″E
- Country: France
- Region: Bourgogne-Franche-Comté
- Department: Haute-Saône
- Arrondissement: Lure
- Canton: Mélisey
- Area^{1}: 5.54 km^{2} (2.14 sq mi)
- Highest elevation: 486 m (1,594 ft)
- Lowest elevation: 345 m (1,132 ft)
- Population (2023): 126
  - Density: 22.7/km^{2} (58.9/sq mi)
- Time zone: UTC+01:00 (CET)
  - Summer (DST): UTC+02:00 (CEST)
- INSEE/Postal code: 70233 /70310
- ^{1} French Land Register data, which excludes lakes, ponds, glaciers > 1 km^{2} (0.386 sq mi or 247 acres) and river estuaries.

Les Fessey (before 1962: Fessey-Dessous-et-Dessus) is a commune in the Haute-Saône department in the region of Bourgogne-Franche-Comté in eastern France.

== See also ==
- Communes of the Haute-Saône department
