= Belmont, Haute-Saône =

Belmont
- Commune
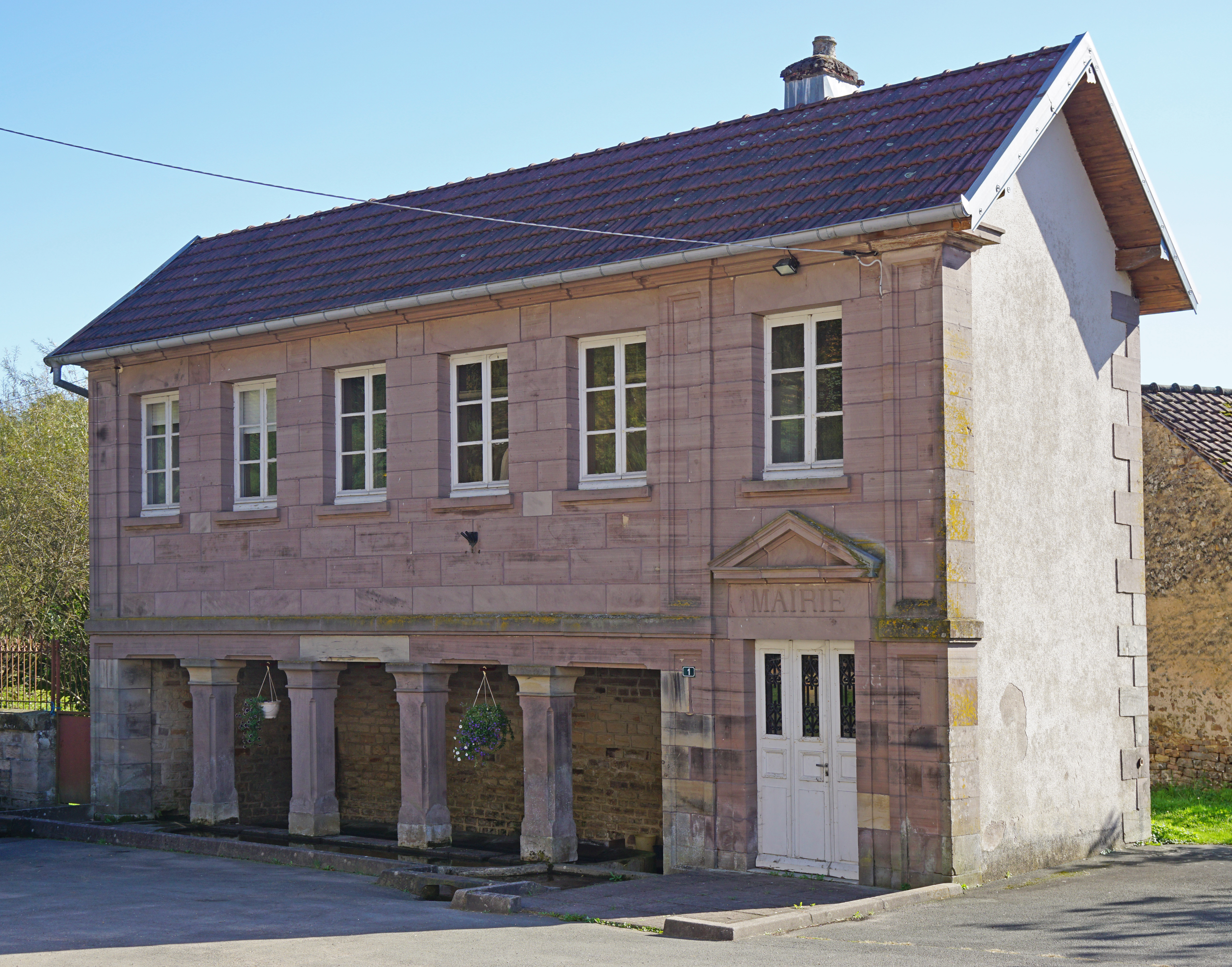
- The town hall in Belmont
- Location of Belmont
- Location within France Location within Bourgogne-Franche-Comté
- Coordinates: 47°47′16″N 6°30′15″E
- Country: France
- Region: Bourgogne-Franche-Comté
- Department: Haute-Saône
- Arrondissement: Lure
- Canton: Mélisey

Government
  - Mayor (2020–2026): Étienne Calley
- Area^{1}: 4.50 km^{2} (1.74 sq mi)
- Highest elevation: 417 m (1,368 ft)
- Lowest elevation: 335 m (1,099 ft)
- Population (2023): 140
  - Density: 31/km^{2} (81/sq mi)
- Time zone: UTC+01:00 (CET)
  - Summer (DST): UTC+02:00 (CEST)
- INSEE/Postal code: 70062 /70270
- ^{1} French Land Register data, which excludes lakes, ponds, glaciers > 1 km^{2} (0.386 sq mi or 247 acres) and river estuaries.

Belmont (French pronunciation: [bɛlmɔ̃]) is a commune in the Haute-Saône department in the region of Bourgogne-Franche-Comté in eastern France.

== See also ==
- Communes of the Haute-Saône department
