= Belfahy =

- Commune
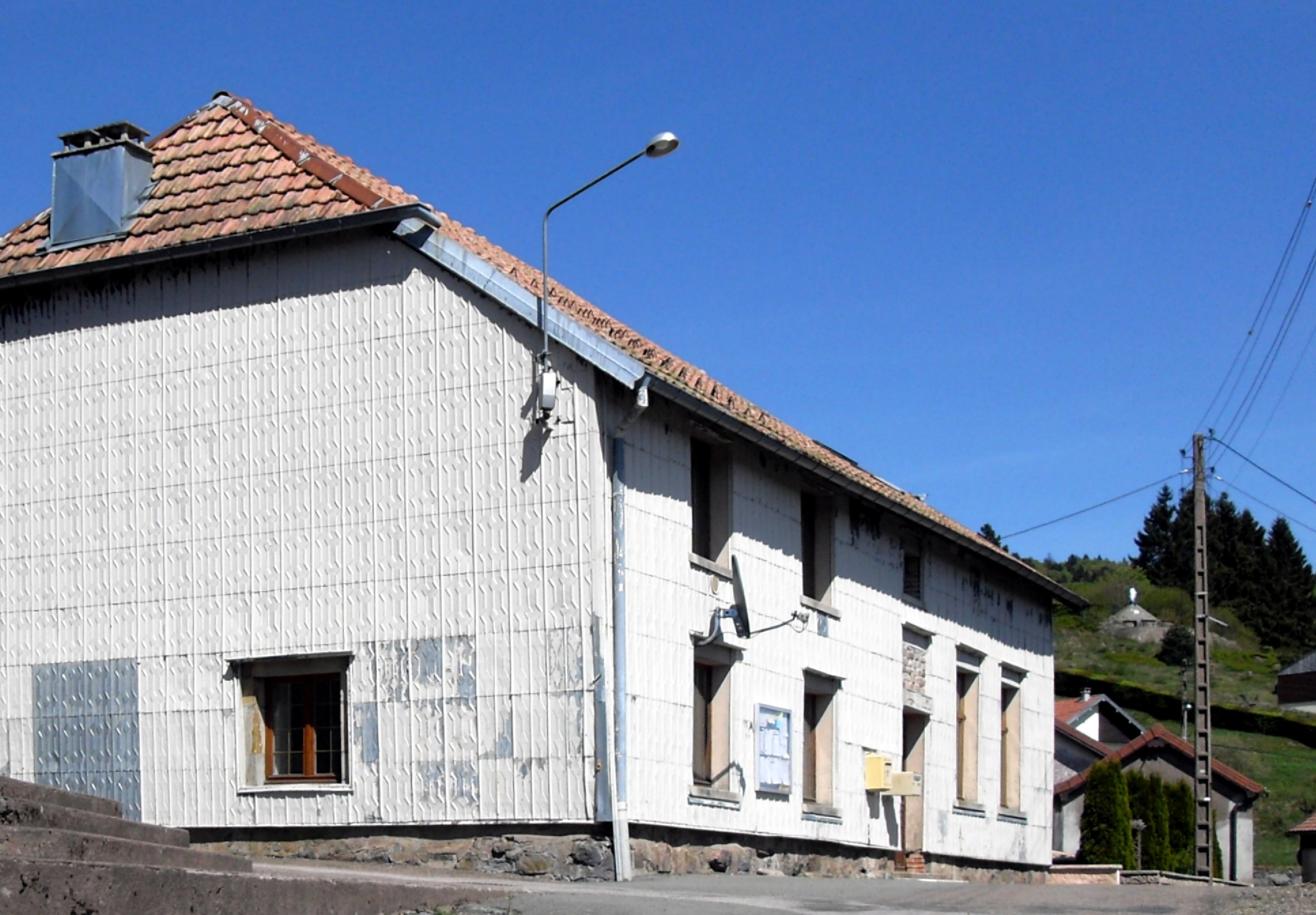
- The town hall in Belfahy

- Coat of arms
- Location of Belfahy
- Location within France Location within Bourgogne-Franche-Comté
- Coordinates: 47°47′04″N 6°43′59″E
- Country: France
- Region: Bourgogne-Franche-Comté
- Department: Haute-Saône
- Arrondissement: Lure
- Canton: Mélisey

Government
  - Mayor (2020–2026): Julien Py
- Area^{1}: 3.07 km^{2} (1.19 sq mi)
- Highest elevation: 1,050 m (3,440 ft)
- Lowest elevation: 520 m (1,710 ft)
- Population (2023): 83
  - Density: 27/km^{2} (70/sq mi)
- Time zone: UTC+01:00 (CET)
  - Summer (DST): UTC+02:00 (CEST)
- INSEE/Postal code: 70061 /70290
- ^{1} French Land Register data, which excludes lakes, ponds, glaciers > 1 km^{2} (0.386 sq mi or 247 acres) and river estuaries.

Belfahy (French pronunciation: [bɛlfa.i]) is a commune in the Haute-Saône department in the region of Bourgogne-Franche-Comté in eastern France.

== See also ==
- Communes of the Haute-Saône department
