= Breuchotte =

- Commune
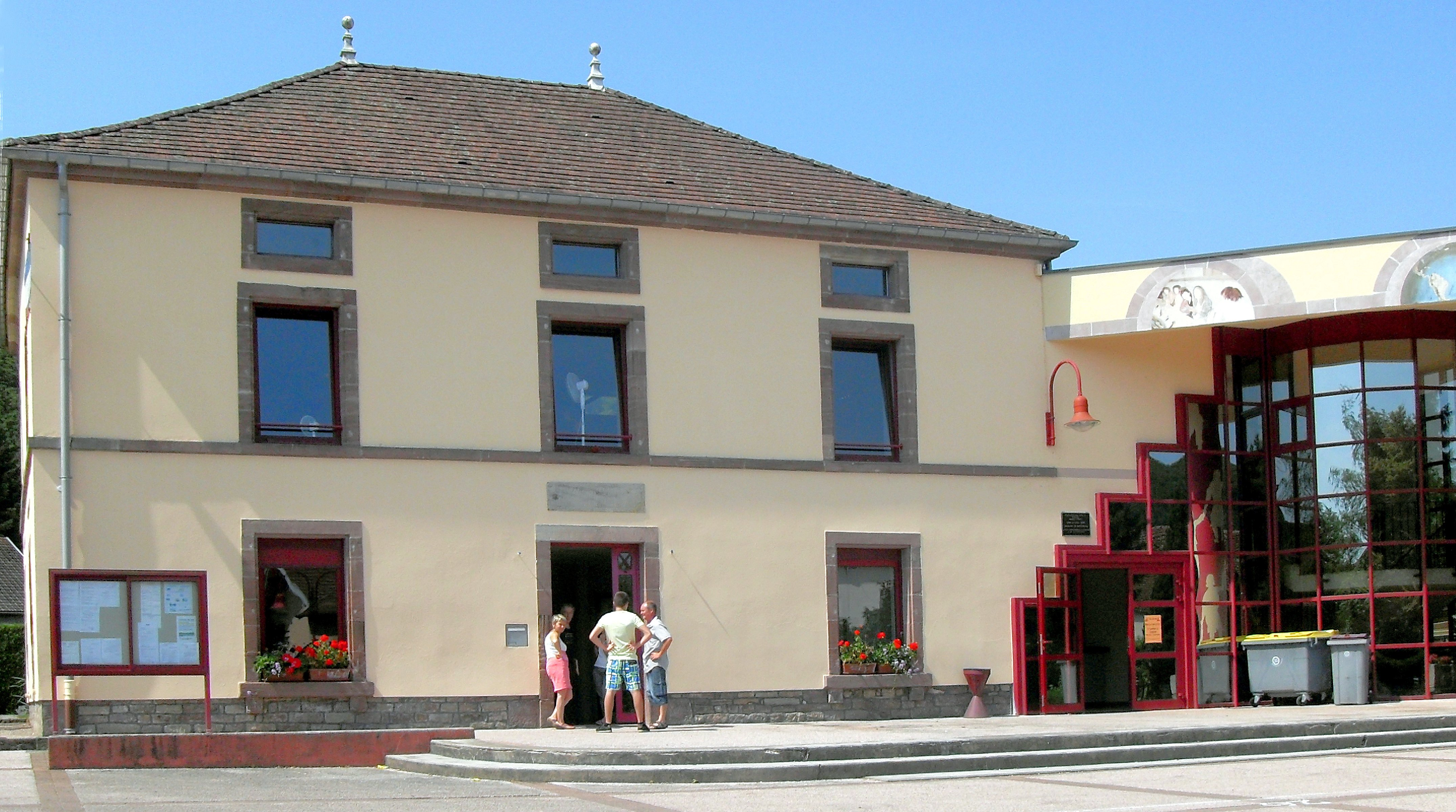
- The town hall in Breuchotte
- Location of Breuchotte
- Location within France Location within Bourgogne-Franche-Comté
- Coordinates: 47°50′13″N 6°28′12″E
- Country: France
- Region: Bourgogne-Franche-Comté
- Department: Haute-Saône
- Arrondissement: Lure
- Canton: Mélisey

Government
  - Mayor (2020–2026): Joël Daval
- Area^{1}: 4.37 km^{2} (1.69 sq mi)
- Highest elevation: 422 m (1,385 ft)
- Lowest elevation: 312 m (1,024 ft)
- Population (2023): 299
  - Density: 68.4/km^{2} (177/sq mi)
- Time zone: UTC+01:00 (CET)
  - Summer (DST): UTC+02:00 (CEST)
- INSEE/Postal code: 70094 /70280
- ^{1} French Land Register data, which excludes lakes, ponds, glaciers > 1 km^{2} (0.386 sq mi or 247 acres) and river estuaries.

Breuchotte (French pronunciation: [bʁøʃɔt]) is a commune in the Haute-Saône department in the region of Bourgogne-Franche-Comté in eastern France.

== See also ==
- Communes of the Haute-Saône department
