= La Lanterne-et-les-Armonts =

- Commune
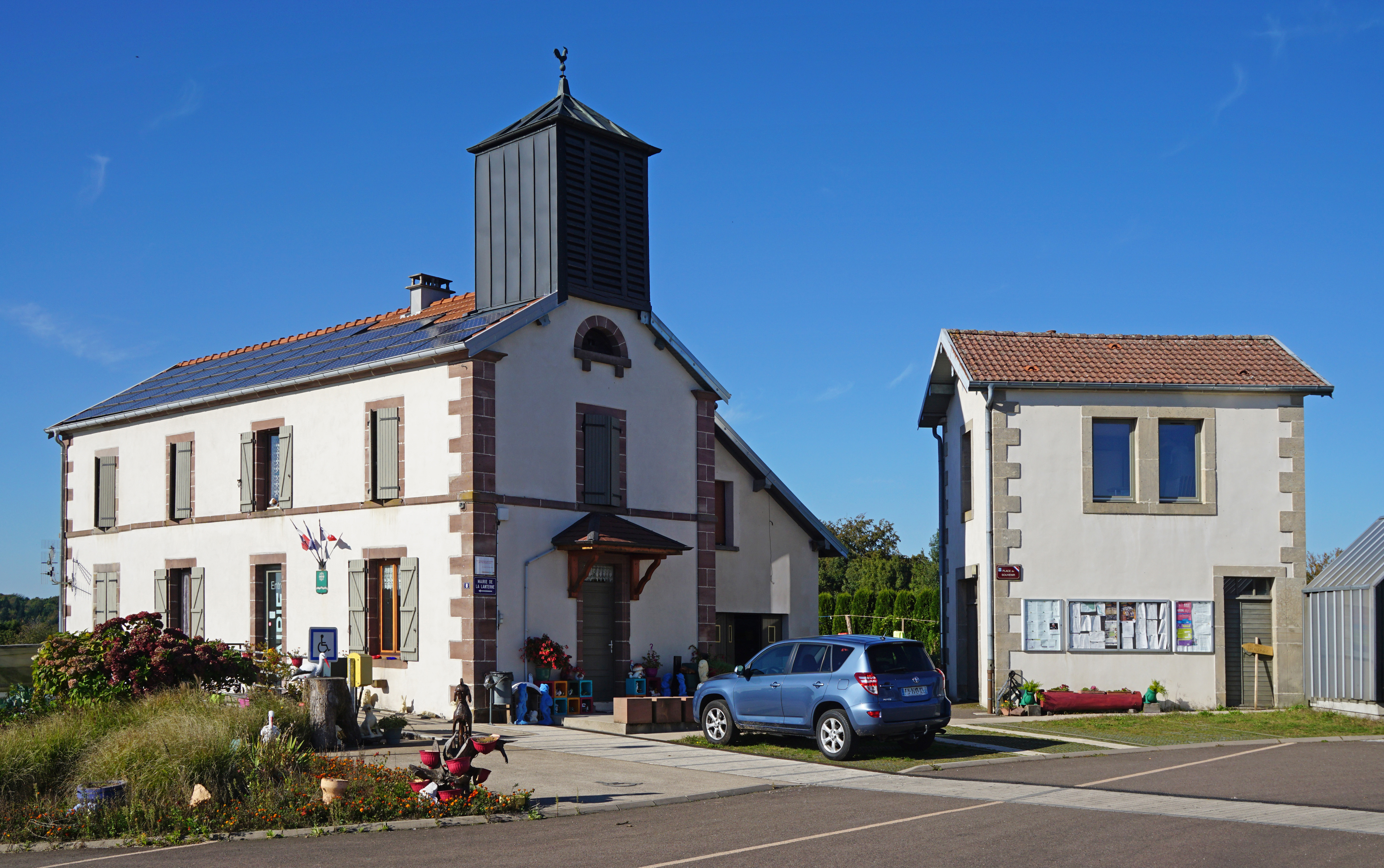
- The town hall in La Lanterne-et-les-Armonts

- Coat of arms
- Location of La Lanterne-et-les-Armonts
- Location within France Location within Bourgogne-Franche-Comté
- Coordinates: 47°47′39″N 6°31′39″E
- Country: France
- Region: Bourgogne-Franche-Comté
- Department: Haute-Saône
- Arrondissement: Lure
- Canton: Mélisey

Government
  - Mayor (2020–2026): Jean-Marc Sigust
- Area^{1}: 9.89 km^{2} (3.82 sq mi)
- Highest elevation: 492 m (1,614 ft)
- Lowest elevation: 345 m (1,132 ft)
- Population (2023): 185
  - Density: 18.7/km^{2} (48.4/sq mi)
- Time zone: UTC+01:00 (CET)
  - Summer (DST): UTC+02:00 (CEST)
- INSEE/Postal code: 70295 /70270
- ^{1} French Land Register data, which excludes lakes, ponds, glaciers > 1 km^{2} (0.386 sq mi or 247 acres) and river estuaries.

La Lanterne-et-les-Armonts (French pronunciation: [la lɑ̃tɛʁn e le.z‿aʁmɔ̃]) is a commune in the Haute-Saône department in the region of Bourgogne-Franche-Comté in eastern France.

== See also ==
- Communes of the Haute-Saône department
