= Écromagny =

- Commune
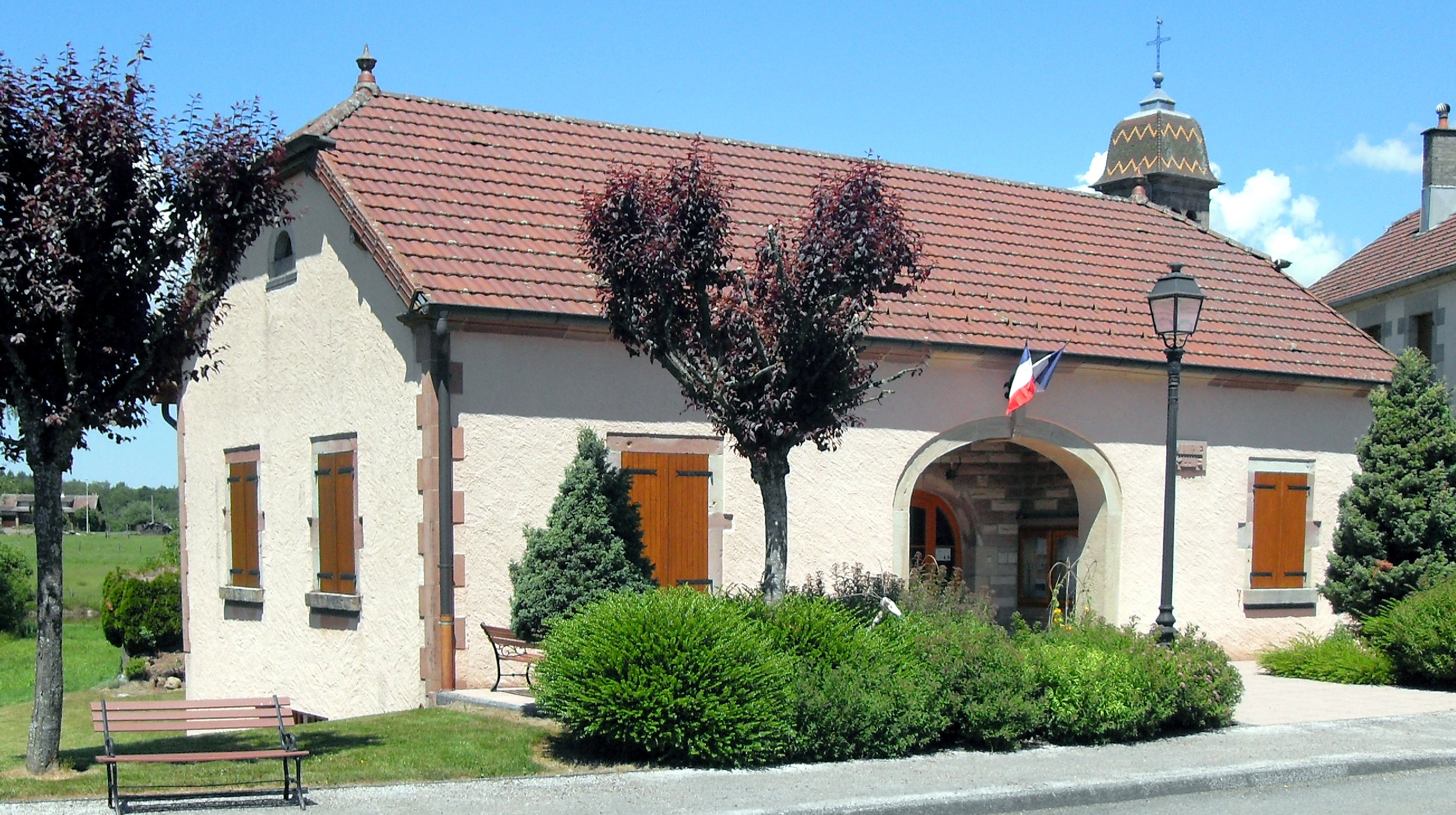
- The town hall in Écromagny

- Coat of arms
- Location of Écromagny
- Location within France Location within Bourgogne-Franche-Comté
- Coordinates: 47°47′39″N 6°33′51″E
- Country: France
- Region: Bourgogne-Franche-Comté
- Department: Haute-Saône
- Arrondissement: Lure
- Canton: Mélisey

Government
  - Mayor (2020–2026): Michèle Chipaux
- Area^{1}: 6.80 km^{2} (2.63 sq mi)
- Highest elevation: 492 m (1,614 ft)
- Lowest elevation: 370 m (1,210 ft)
- Population (2023): 149
  - Density: 21.9/km^{2} (56.8/sq mi)
- Time zone: UTC+01:00 (CET)
  - Summer (DST): UTC+02:00 (CEST)
- INSEE/Postal code: 70210 /70270
- ^{1} French Land Register data, which excludes lakes, ponds, glaciers > 1 km^{2} (0.386 sq mi or 247 acres) and river estuaries.

Écromagny (French pronunciation: [ekʁɔmaɲi]) is a commune in the Haute-Saône department in the region of Bourgogne-Franche-Comté in eastern France.

== See also ==
- Communes of the Haute-Saône department
