= Montessaux =

- Commune
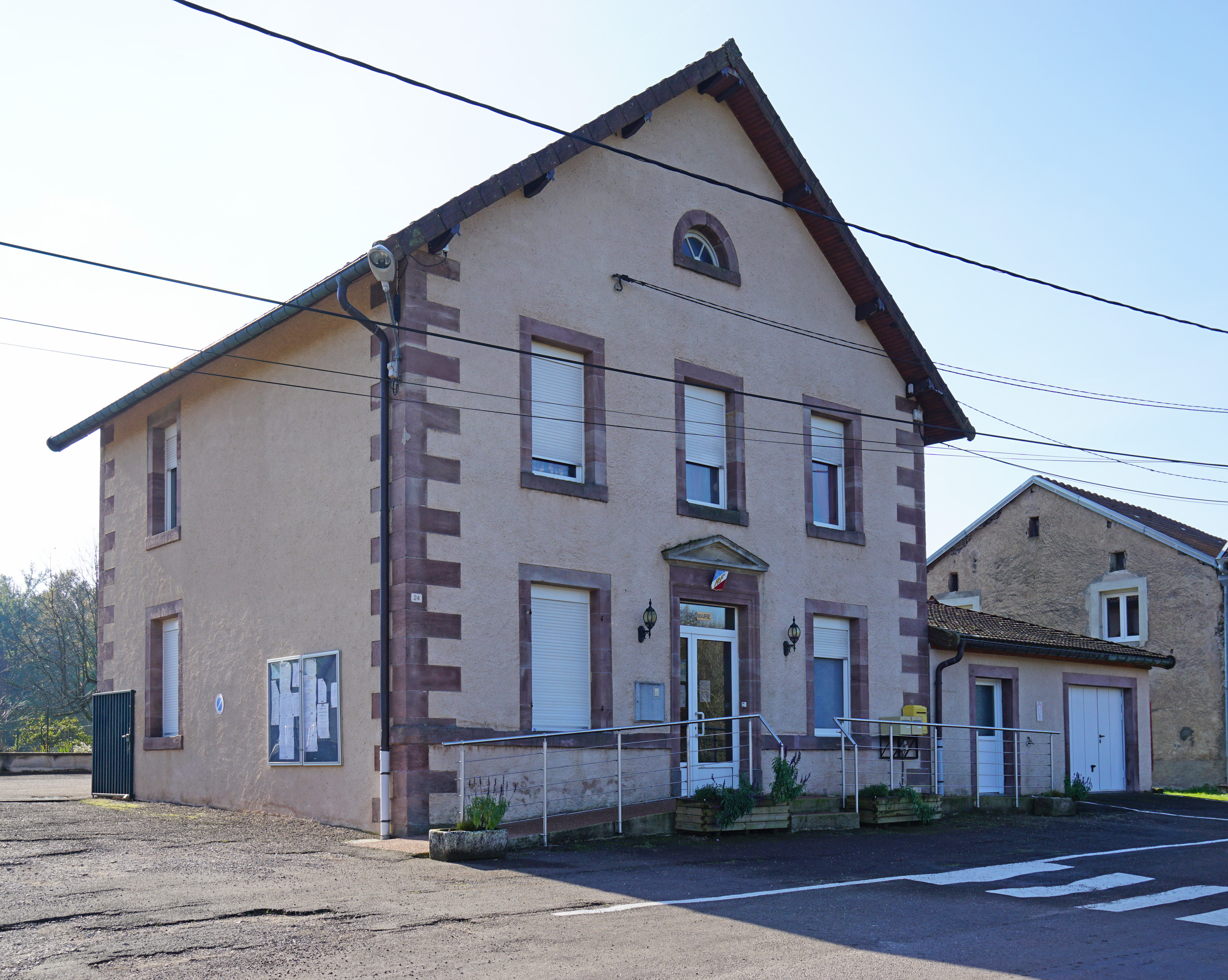
- The town hall in Montessaux
- Location of Montessaux
- Location within France Location within Bourgogne-Franche-Comté
- Coordinates: 47°44′30″N 6°34′00″E
- Country: France
- Region: Bourgogne-Franche-Comté
- Department: Haute-Saône
- Arrondissement: Lure
- Canton: Mélisey

Government
  - Mayor (2020–2026): René Demange
- Area^{1}: 3.05 km^{2} (1.18 sq mi)
- Highest elevation: 350 m (1,150 ft)
- Lowest elevation: 315 m (1,033 ft)
- Population (2023): 178
  - Density: 58.4/km^{2} (151/sq mi)
- Time zone: UTC+01:00 (CET)
  - Summer (DST): UTC+02:00 (CEST)
- INSEE/Postal code: 70361 /70270
- ^{1} French Land Register data, which excludes lakes, ponds, glaciers > 1 km^{2} (0.386 sq mi or 247 acres) and river estuaries.

Montessaux (French pronunciation: [mɔ̃tɛso]) is a commune in the Haute-Saône department in the region of Bourgogne-Franche-Comté in eastern France.

== See also ==
- Communes of the Haute-Saône department
