= La Rosière, Haute-Saône =

La Rosière
- Commune
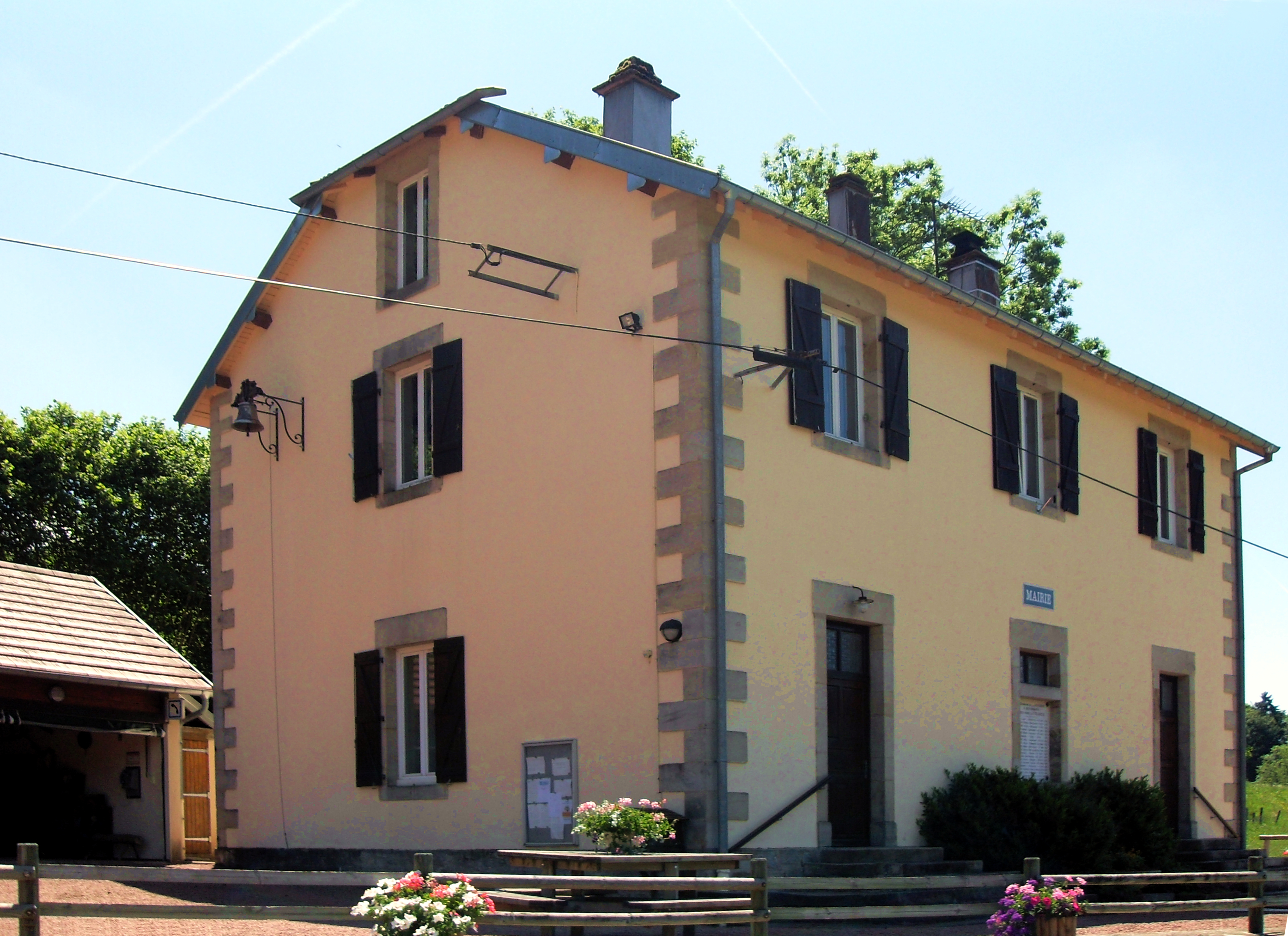
- The town hall in La Rosière

- Coat of arms
- Location of La Rosière
- Location within France Location within Bourgogne-Franche-Comté
- Coordinates: 47°54′29″N 6°37′33″E
- Country: France
- Region: Bourgogne-Franche-Comté
- Department: Haute-Saône
- Arrondissement: Lure
- Canton: Mélisey

Government
  - Mayor (2020–2026): François Mange
- Area^{1}: 9.00 km^{2} (3.47 sq mi)
- Highest elevation: 818 m (2,684 ft)
- Lowest elevation: 439 m (1,440 ft)
- Population (2023): 80
  - Density: 8.9/km^{2} (23/sq mi)
- Time zone: UTC+01:00 (CET)
  - Summer (DST): UTC+02:00 (CEST)
- INSEE/Postal code: 70453 /70310
- ^{1} French Land Register data, which excludes lakes, ponds, glaciers > 1 km^{2} (0.386 sq mi or 247 acres) and river estuaries.

La Rosière (French pronunciation: [la ʁozjɛʁ]) is a commune in the Haute-Saône department in the region of Bourgogne-Franche-Comté in eastern France.

== See also ==
- Communes of the Haute-Saône department
