= Belonchamp =

- Commune
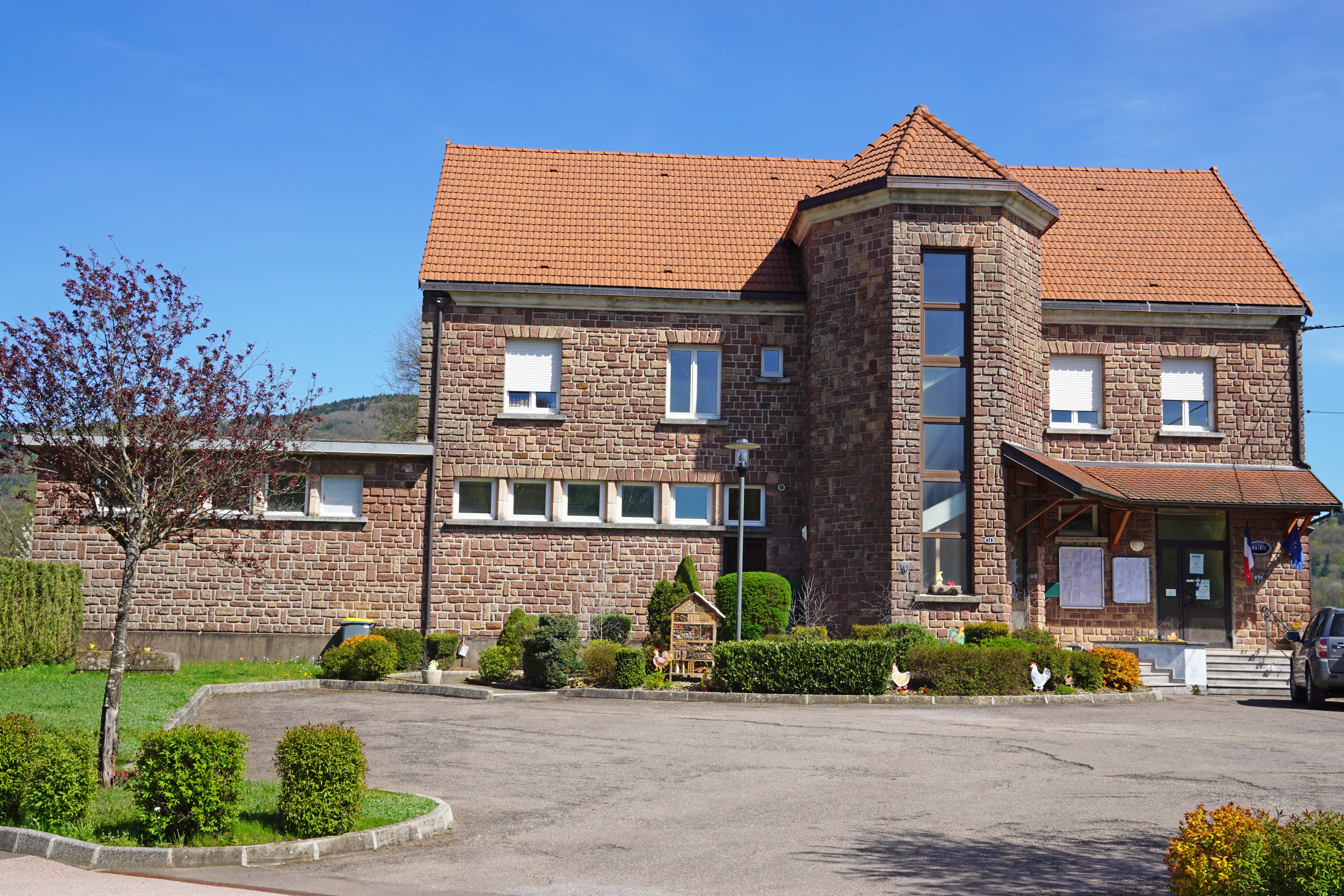
- The town hall in Belonchamp

- Coat of arms
- Location of Belonchamp
- Location within France Location within Bourgogne-Franche-Comté
- Coordinates: 47°46′14″N 6°36′42″E
- Country: France
- Region: Bourgogne-Franche-Comté
- Department: Haute-Saône
- Arrondissement: Lure
- Canton: Mélisey
- Area^{1}: 6.87 km^{2} (2.65 sq mi)
- Highest elevation: 680 m (2,230 ft)
- Lowest elevation: 334 m (1,096 ft)
- Population (2023): 207
  - Density: 30.1/km^{2} (78.0/sq mi)
- Time zone: UTC+01:00 (CET)
  - Summer (DST): UTC+02:00 (CEST)
- INSEE/Postal code: 70063 /70270
- ^{1} French Land Register data, which excludes lakes, ponds, glaciers > 1 km^{2} (0.386 sq mi or 247 acres) and river estuaries.

Belonchamp is a commune in the Haute-Saône department in the region of Bourgogne-Franche-Comté in eastern France.

== See also ==
- Communes of the Haute-Saône department
