= Haut-du-Them-Château-Lambert =

- Commune
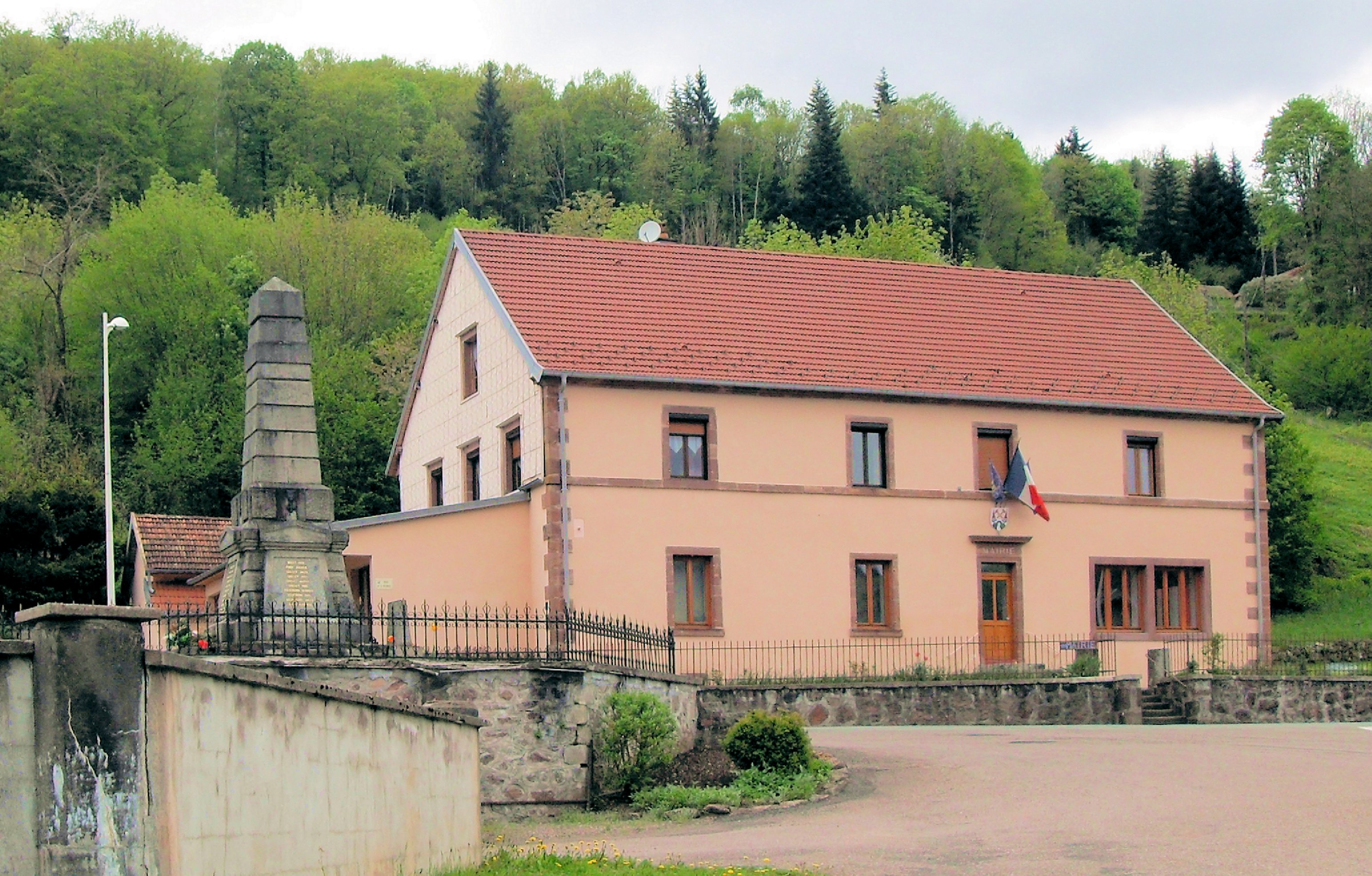
- The town hall in Haut-du-Them-Château-Lambert

- Coat of arms
- Location of Haut-du-Them-Château-Lambert
- Location within France Location within Bourgogne-Franche-Comté
- Coordinates: 47°50′37″N 6°43′24″E
- Country: France
- Region: Bourgogne-Franche-Comté
- Department: Haute-Saône
- Arrondissement: Lure
- Canton: Mélisey

Government
  - Mayor (2020–2026): Sylviane Valdenaire
- Area^{1}: 25.16 km^{2} (9.71 sq mi)
- Highest elevation: 1,215 m (3,986 ft)
- Lowest elevation: 421 m (1,381 ft)
- Population (2023): 449
  - Density: 17.8/km^{2} (46.2/sq mi)
- Time zone: UTC+01:00 (CET)
  - Summer (DST): UTC+02:00 (CEST)
- INSEE/Postal code: 70283 /70440
- ^{1} French Land Register data, which excludes lakes, ponds, glaciers > 1 km^{2} (0.386 sq mi or 247 acres) and river estuaries.

Haut-du-Them-Château-Lambert (French pronunciation: [o dy tɛm ʃato lɑ̃bɛʁ]) is a commune in the Haute-Saône department in the region of Bourgogne-Franche-Comté in eastern France. It was created in 1973 by the merger of two former communes: Haut-du-Them and Château-Lambert.

== See also ==
- Communes of the Haute-Saône department
