= Esmoulières =

- Commune
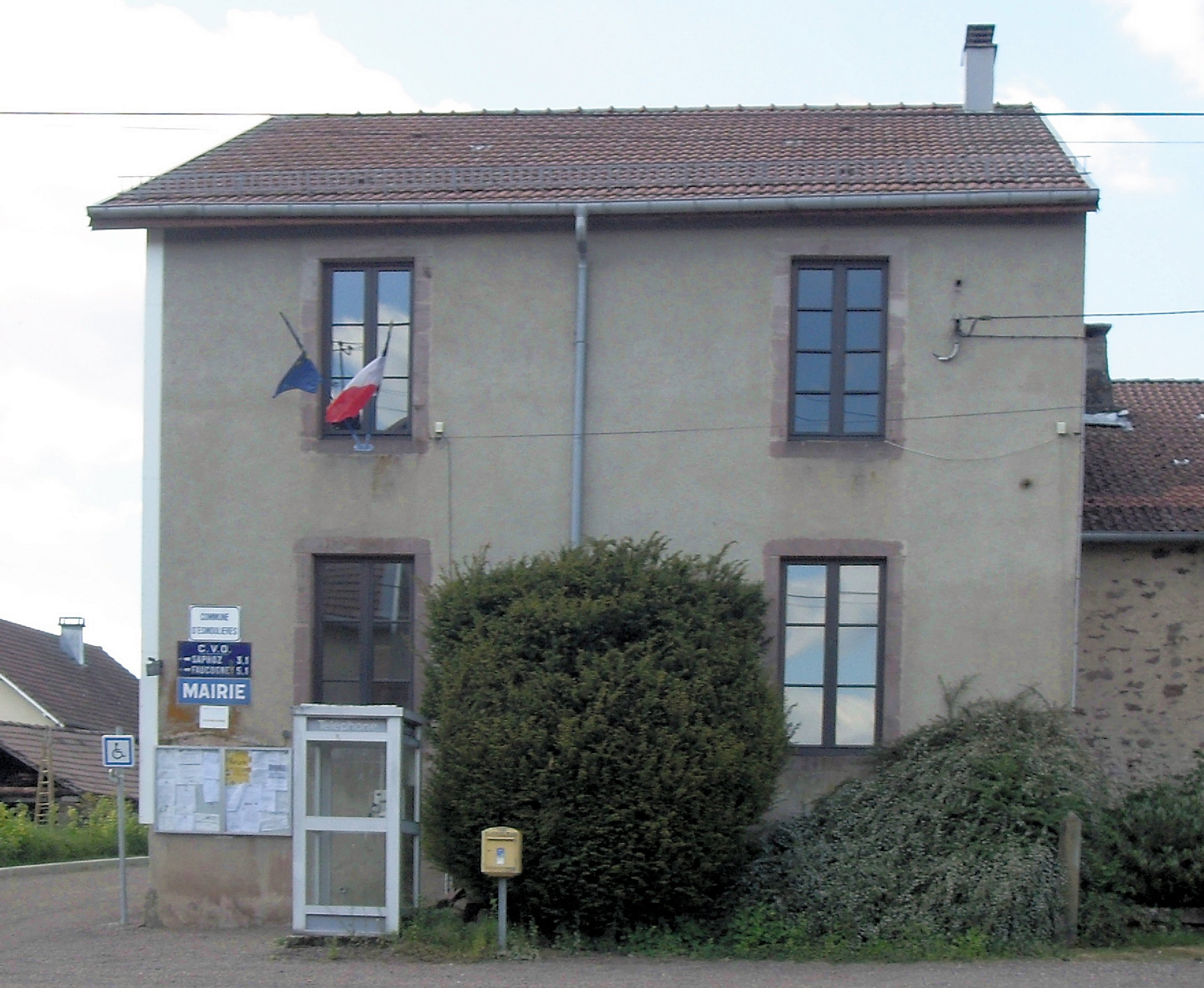
- The town hall in Esmoulières

- Coat of arms
- Location of Esmoulières
- Location within France Location within Bourgogne-Franche-Comté
- Coordinates: 47°51′12″N 6°36′58″E
- Country: France
- Region: Bourgogne-Franche-Comté
- Department: Haute-Saône
- Arrondissement: Lure
- Canton: Mélisey
- Area^{1}: 20.11 km^{2} (7.76 sq mi)
- Highest elevation: 674 m (2,211 ft)
- Lowest elevation: 367 m (1,204 ft)
- Population (2023): 95
  - Density: 4.7/km^{2} (12/sq mi)
- Time zone: UTC+01:00 (CET)
  - Summer (DST): UTC+02:00 (CEST)
- INSEE/Postal code: 70217 /70310
- ^{1} French Land Register data, which excludes lakes, ponds, glaciers > 1 km^{2} (0.386 sq mi or 247 acres) and river estuaries.

Esmoulières is a commune in the Haute-Saône department in the region of Bourgogne-Franche-Comté in eastern France. The dwarf chansonnier Auguste Tuaillon (1873–1907) was born in Esmoulières.

== See also ==
- Communes of the Haute-Saône department
