= Corravillers =

- Commune
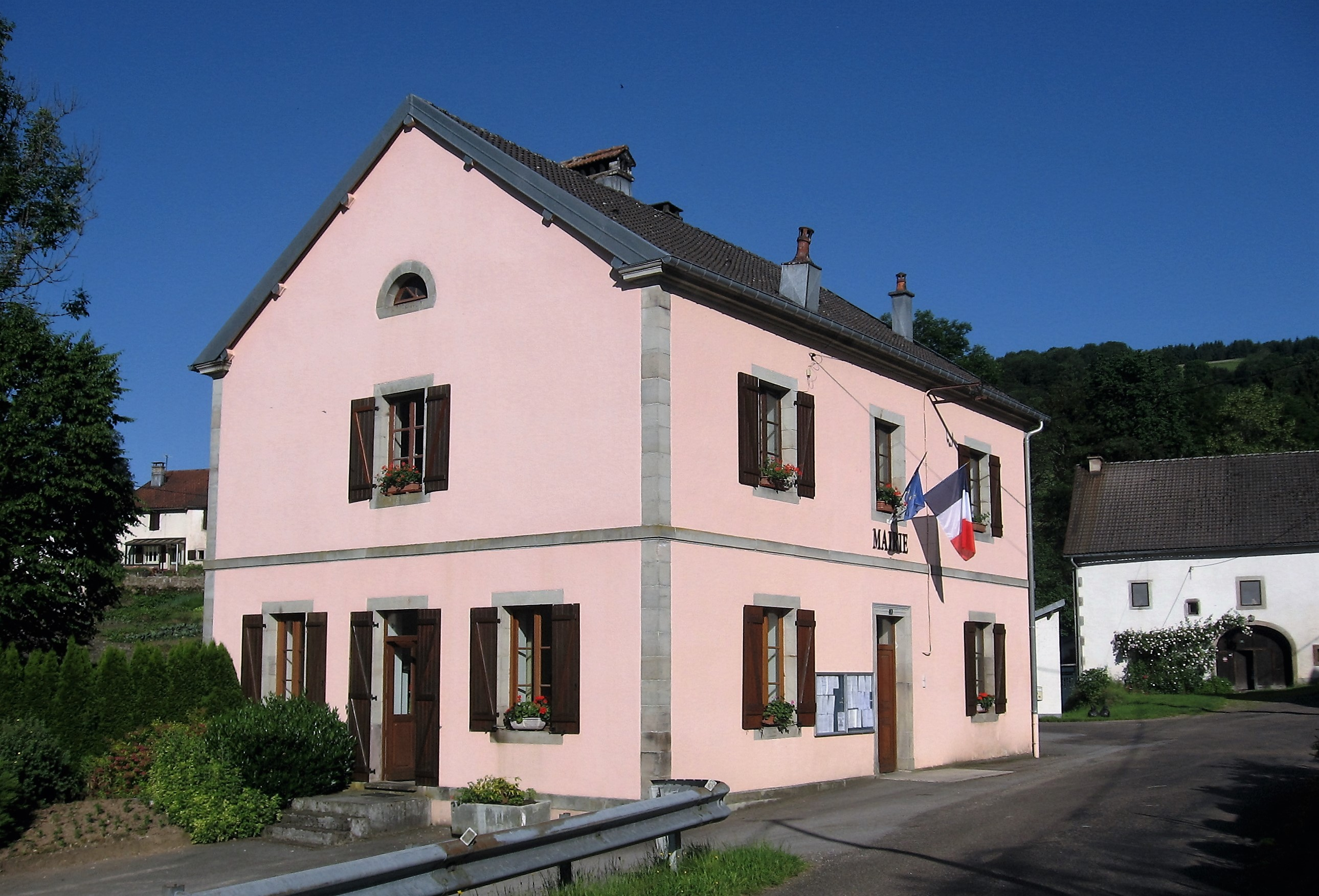
- The town hall in Corravillers

- Coat of arms
- Location of Corravillers
- Location within France Location within Bourgogne-Franche-Comté
- Coordinates: 47°53′38″N 6°37′24″E
- Country: France
- Region: Bourgogne-Franche-Comté
- Department: Haute-Saône
- Arrondissement: Lure
- Canton: Mélisey
- Area^{1}: 11.20 km^{2} (4.32 sq mi)
- Highest elevation: 768 m (2,520 ft)
- Lowest elevation: 415 m (1,362 ft)
- Population (2023): 161
  - Density: 14.4/km^{2} (37.2/sq mi)
- Time zone: UTC+01:00 (CET)
  - Summer (DST): UTC+02:00 (CEST)
- INSEE/Postal code: 70176 /70310
- ^{1} French Land Register data, which excludes lakes, ponds, glaciers > 1 km^{2} (0.386 sq mi or 247 acres) and river estuaries.

Corravillers is a commune in the Haute-Saône department in the region of Bourgogne-Franche-Comté in eastern France.

== See also ==
- Communes of the Haute-Saône department
