= La Montagne, Haute-Saône =

Commune in Bourgogne-Franche-Comté, France

La Montagne
- Commune
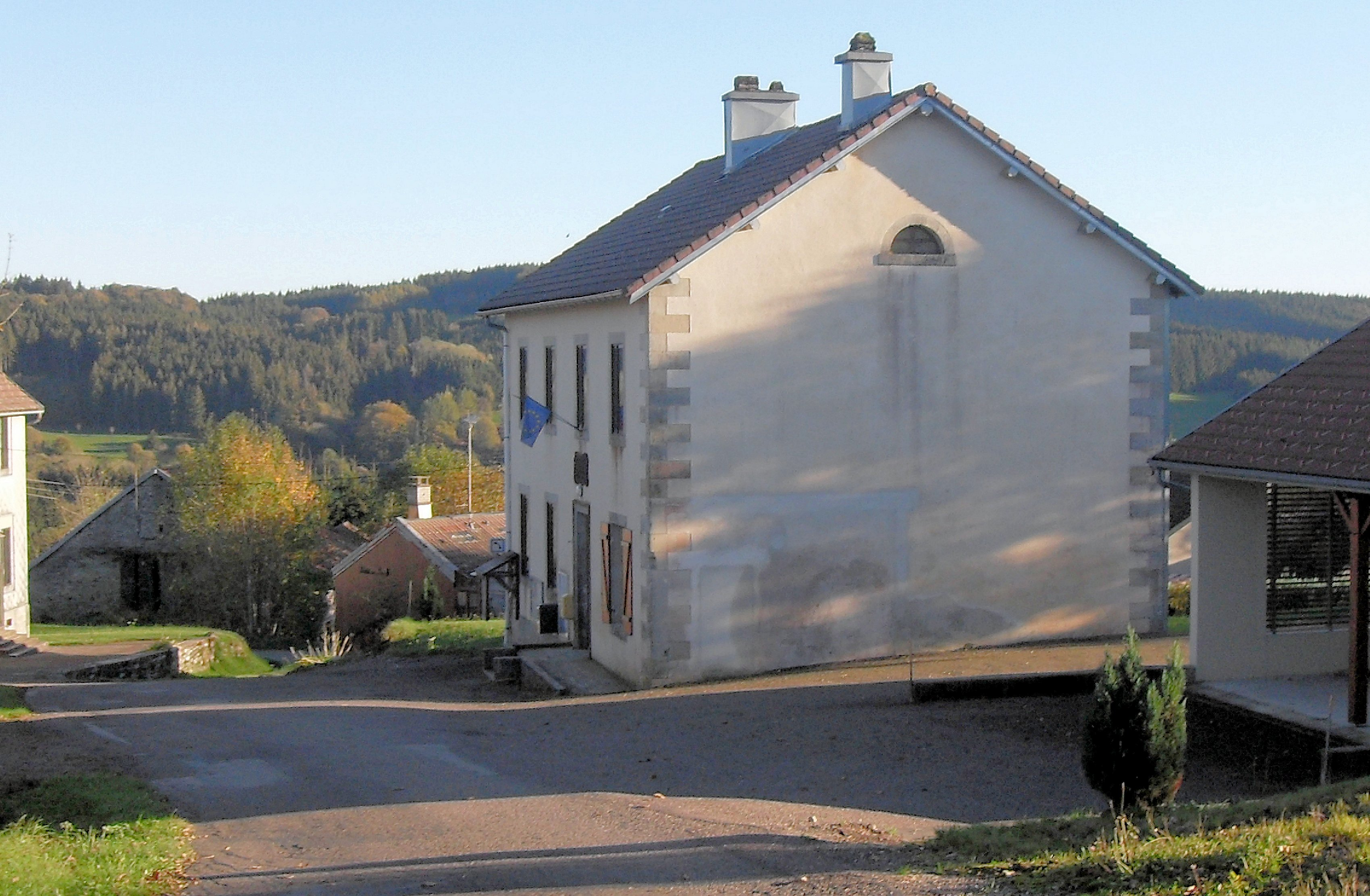
- The town hall in La Montagne
- Location of La Montagne
- Location within France Location within Bourgogne-Franche-Comté
- Coordinates: 47°55′18″N 6°35′33″E
- Country: France
- Region: Bourgogne-Franche-Comté
- Department: Haute-Saône
- Arrondissement: Lure
- Canton: Mélisey

Government
  - Mayor (2020–2026): Jean-Marie Brice
- Area^{1}: 12.61 km^{2} (4.87 sq mi)
- Highest elevation: 808 m (2,651 ft)
- Lowest elevation: 570 m (1,870 ft)
- Population (2023): 37
  - Density: 2.9/km^{2} (7.6/sq mi)
- Time zone: UTC+01:00 (CET)
  - Summer (DST): UTC+02:00 (CEST)
- INSEE/Postal code: 70352 /70310
- ^{1} French Land Register data, which excludes lakes, ponds, glaciers > 1 km^{2} (0.386 sq mi or 247 acres) and river estuaries.

La Montagne (French pronunciation: [la mɔ̃taɲ]) is a commune in the Haute-Saône department in the region of Bourgogne-Franche-Comté in eastern France. It is part of the Vosges Massif with which it shares a common cultural and historical mountain ancestry.

Its inhabitants are called the Montaignions.

== See also ==
- Communes of the Haute-Saône department
