= La Proiselière-et-Langle =

- Commune
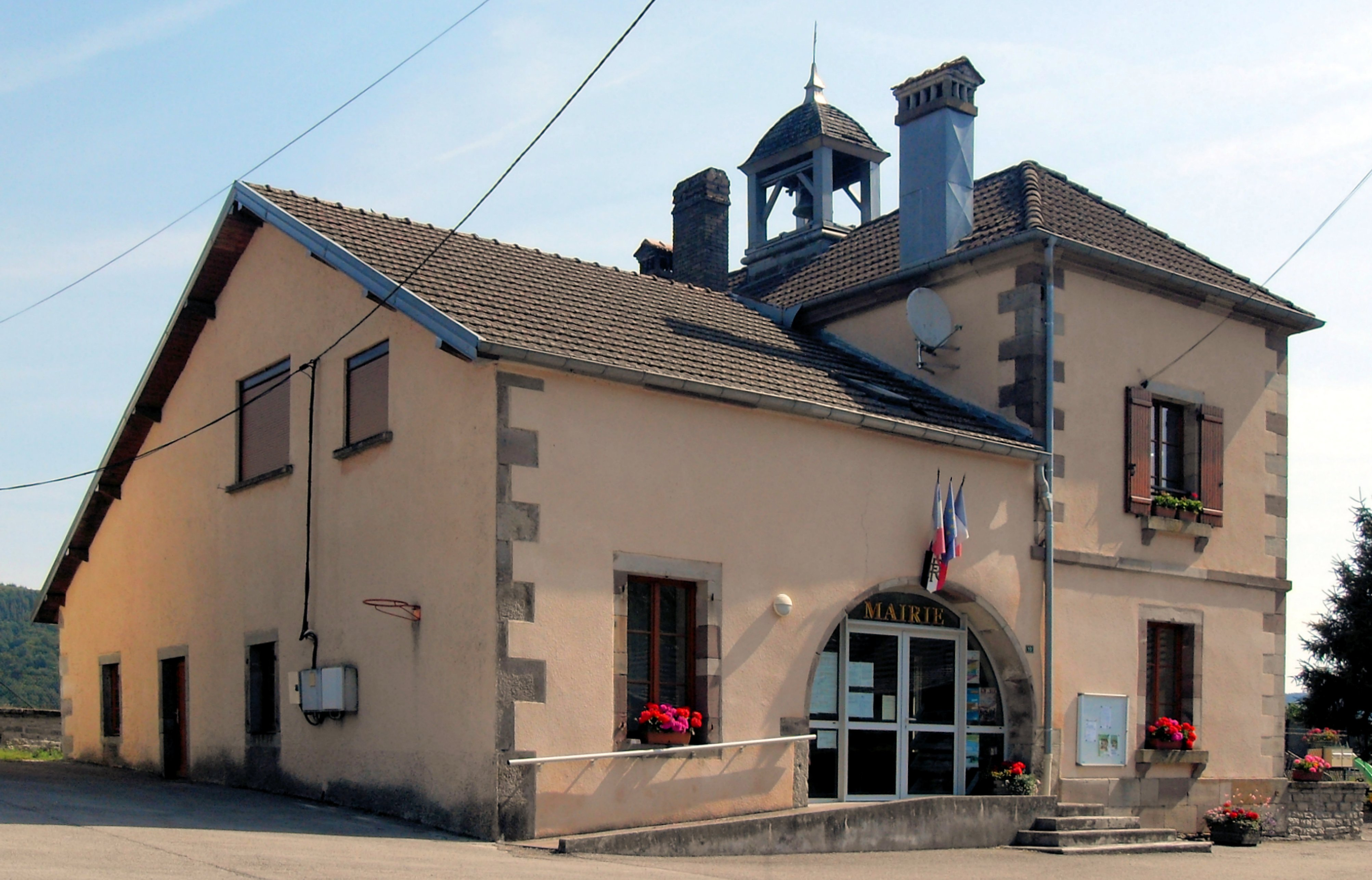
- The town hall in La Proiselière-et-Langle

- Coat of arms
- Location of La Proiselière-et-Langle
- Location within France Location within Bourgogne-Franche-Comté
- Coordinates: 47°49′38″N 6°30′12″E
- Country: France
- Region: Bourgogne-Franche-Comté
- Department: Haute-Saône
- Arrondissement: Lure
- Canton: Mélisey
- Area^{1}: 7.06 km^{2} (2.73 sq mi)
- Highest elevation: 442 m (1,450 ft)
- Lowest elevation: 339 m (1,112 ft)
- Population (2023): 141
  - Density: 20.0/km^{2} (51.7/sq mi)
- Time zone: UTC+01:00 (CET)
  - Summer (DST): UTC+02:00 (CEST)
- INSEE/Postal code: 70425 /70310
- ^{1} French Land Register data, which excludes lakes, ponds, glaciers > 1 km^{2} (0.386 sq mi or 247 acres) and river estuaries.

La Proiselière-et-Langle is a commune in the Haute-Saône department in the region of Bourgogne-Franche-Comté in eastern France.

== See also ==
- Communes of the Haute-Saône department
