= La Longine =

- Commune
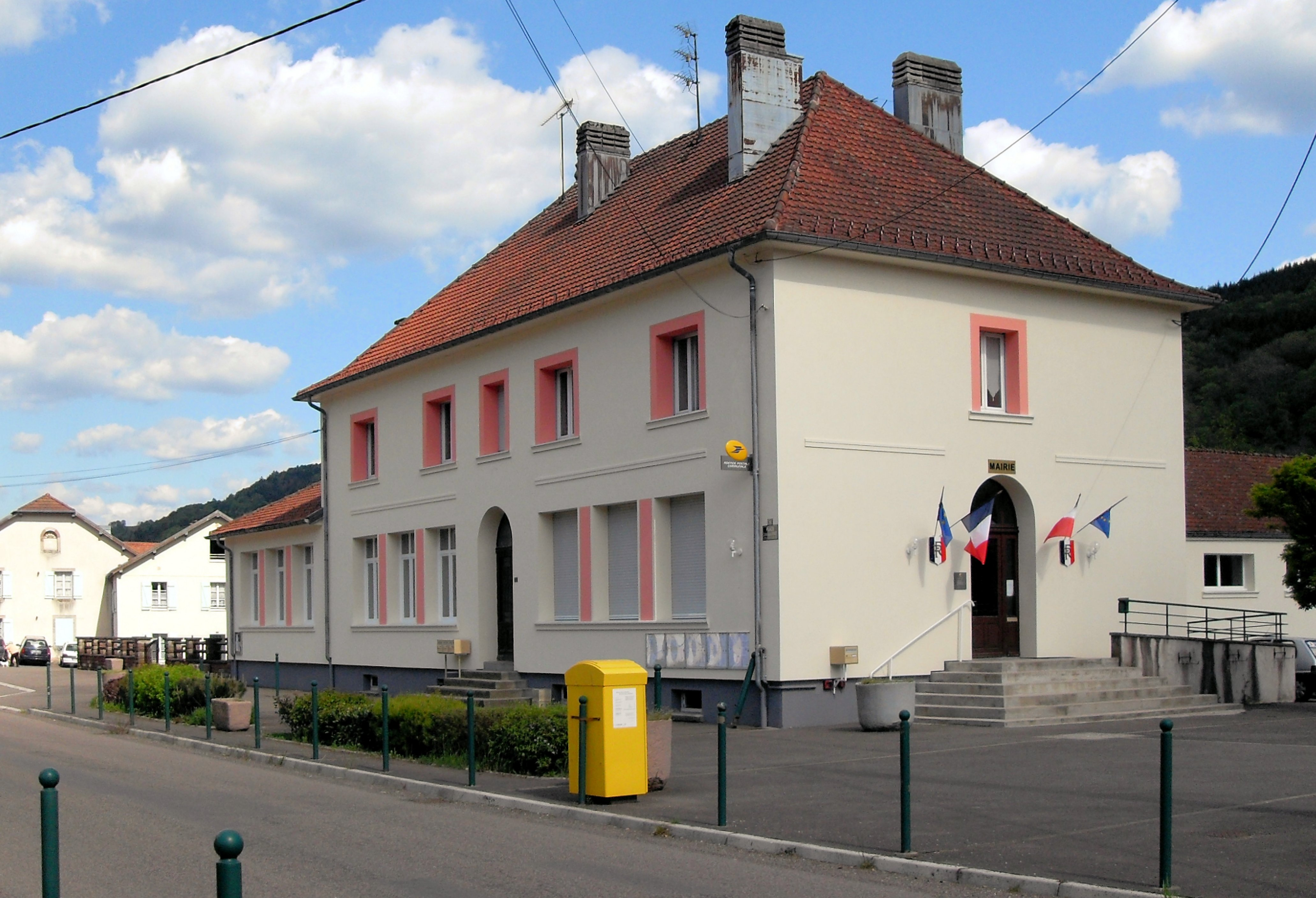
- The town hall in La Longine

- Coat of arms
- Location of La Longine
- Location within France Location within Bourgogne-Franche-Comté
- Coordinates: 47°53′04″N 6°35′29″E
- Country: France
- Region: Bourgogne-Franche-Comté
- Department: Haute-Saône
- Arrondissement: Lure
- Canton: Mélisey

Government
  - Mayor (2020–2026): Jean-Luc Jeudy
- Area^{1}: 12.40 km^{2} (4.79 sq mi)
- Highest elevation: 770 m (2,530 ft)
- Lowest elevation: 395 m (1,296 ft)
- Population (2023): 192
  - Density: 15.5/km^{2} (40.1/sq mi)
- Time zone: UTC+01:00 (CET)
  - Summer (DST): UTC+02:00 (CEST)
- INSEE/Postal code: 70308 /70310
- ^{1} French Land Register data, which excludes lakes, ponds, glaciers > 1 km^{2} (0.386 sq mi or 247 acres) and river estuaries.

La Longine (French pronunciation: [la lɔ̃ʒin]) is a commune in the Haute-Saône department in the region of Bourgogne-Franche-Comté in eastern France.

The village of La Longine is a small village located east of France. It is located in the canton of Mélisey and of the arrondissement of Lure. The area code for La Longine is 70308 (also known as code INSEE), and the zip code is 70310.

== Demography ==
The population of La Longine was 255 in 2007 and the population density was 20.56 inhabitants per km^{2}. The number of housing units in La Longine was 162 in 2007. These homes consist of 113 residences, 37 second or occasional homes and 12 vacant homes.

== See also ==
- Communes of the Haute-Saône department
