= Canton of Mélisey =

Coordinates: 47.76°N 6.58°E

The canton of Mélisey is an administrative division of the Haute-Saône department, northeastern France. Its borders were modified at the French canton reorganisation which came into effect in March 2015. Its seat is in Mélisey.

It consists of the following communes:

1. Amage
2. Amont-et-Effreney
3. Belfahy
4. Belmont
5. Belonchamp
6. Beulotte-Saint-Laurent
7. Breuchotte
8. La Bruyère
9. La Corbière
10. Corravillers
11. Écromagny
12. Esmoulières
13. Faucogney-et-la-Mer
14. Les Fessey
15. Fresse
16. Haut-du-Them-Château-Lambert
17. Lantenot
18. La Lanterne-et-les-Armonts
19. La Longine
20. Magnivray
21. Mélisey
22. La Montagne
23. Montessaux
24. La Proiselière-et-Langle
25. Raddon-et-Chapendu
26. Rignovelle
27. La Rosière
28. Saint-Barthélemy
29. Saint-Bresson
30. Sainte-Marie-en-Chanois
31. Servance-Miellin
32. Ternuay-Melay-et-Saint-Hilaire
33. La Voivre
