= Autrey =

Autrey may refer to:

== Communes in France ==
- Autrey, Meurthe-et-Moselle, in Meurthe-et-Moselle
- Autrey, Vosges, in Vosges
- Autrey-le-Vay, in Haute-Saône
- Autrey-lès-Cerre, in Haute-Saône
- Autrey-lès-Gray, in Haute-Saône

== Surname ==
- Billy Autrey (1933–2020), American football player
- Henry Autrey (born 1952), United States district judge
- Herman Autrey (1904–1980), American jazz trumpeter
- Latta Malette Autrey (1876–1938), American politician
- Scott Autrey (born 1953), motorcycle speedway rider
- Wesley Autrey (born 1956), military officer

== Given name ==
- Autrey Nell Wiley (1901–1990), American literary critic and professor

== Other uses ==
- Autrey Mill Middle School
- Autrey Mill Nature Preserve & Heritage Center
- Autrey House, historic house in Louisiana

== See also ==
- Autry (name), given name and surname
- Blue Stahli, music project of Bret Autrey
