= Velotte =

Velotte may refer to:

- Amblans-et-Velotte, a commune in the Haute-Saône department in eastern France
- Montjustin-et-Velotte, a commune in the Haute-Saône department in the region of Bourgogne-Franche-Comté in eastern France
- Velotte (Besançon), a little village in France
- Velotte-et-Tatignécourt, a commune in the Vosges department in Grand Est in northeastern France.
