= Borey =

Borey may refer to:

== People ==
- Khim Borey (born 1989), Cambodian football player
- Noun Borey (born 1996), Cambodian football player

== Places ==
- Borey, Haute-Saône, Bourgogne-Franche-Comté, France
- Mongkol Borey (town), Cambodia

== Other ==
- Borey or Borei-class submarine (Russian: Борей)
