= Dampvalley-lès-Colombe =

- Commune
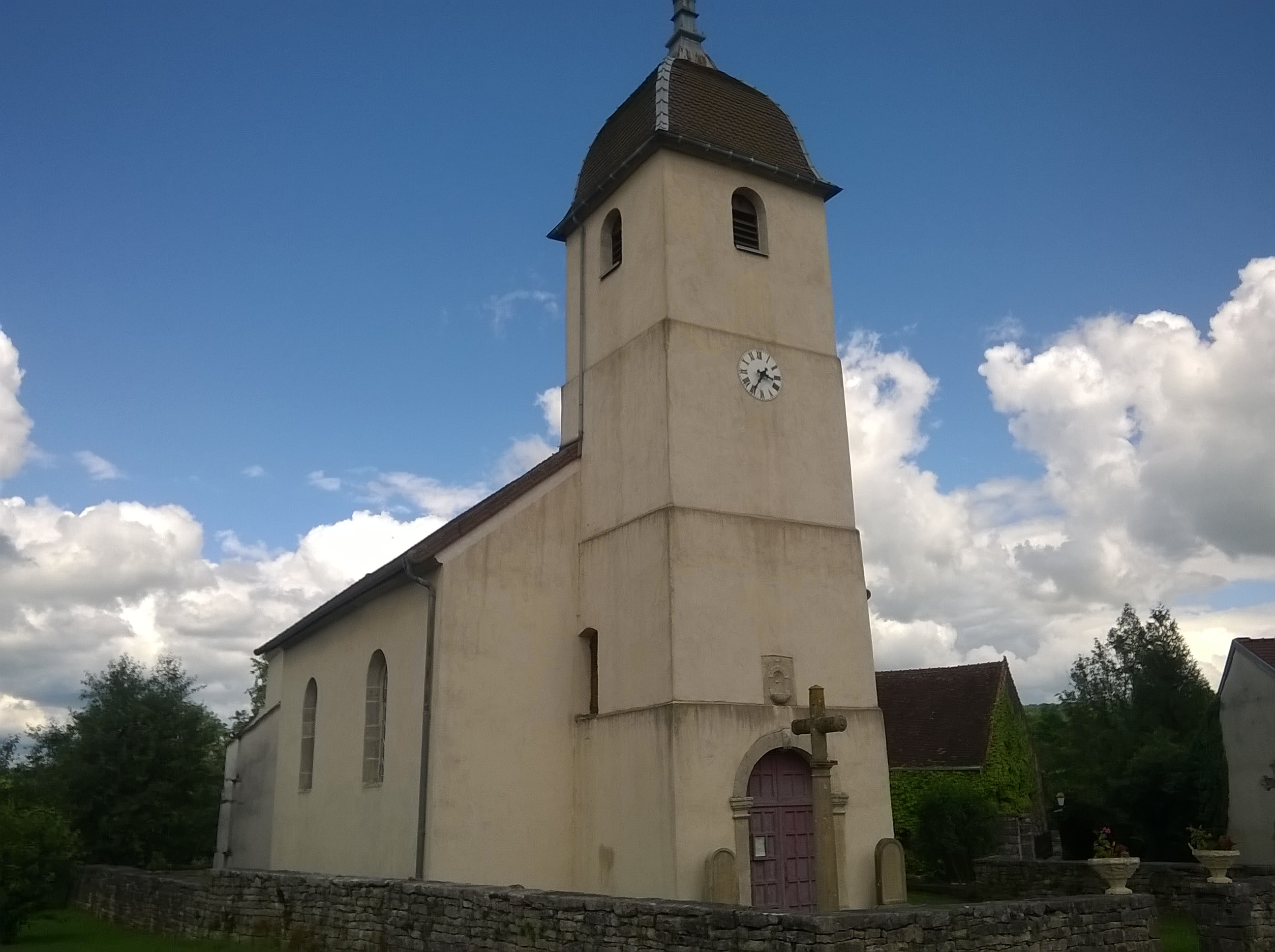
- The church in Dampvalley-lès-Colombe

- Coat of arms
- Location of Dampvalley-lès-Colombe
- Location within France Location within Bourgogne-Franche-Comté
- Coordinates: 47°37′45″N 6°14′45″E
- Country: France
- Region: Bourgogne-Franche-Comté
- Department: Haute-Saône
- Arrondissement: Vesoul
- Canton: Villersexel

Government
  - Mayor (2020–2026): Denis Cleau
- Area^{1}: 6.26 km^{2} (2.42 sq mi)
- Highest elevation: 378 m (1,240 ft)
- Lowest elevation: 244 m (801 ft)
- Population (2023): 118
  - Density: 18.8/km^{2} (48.8/sq mi)
- Time zone: UTC+01:00 (CET)
  - Summer (DST): UTC+02:00 (CEST)
- INSEE/Postal code: 70199 /70000
- ^{1} French Land Register data, which excludes lakes, ponds, glaciers > 1 km^{2} (0.386 sq mi or 247 acres) and river estuaries.

Dampvalley-lès-Colombe (French pronunciation: [kɔlɔ̃b lɛ vəzul], lit. 'Dampvalley near Colombe') is a commune in the Haute-Saône department in the region of Bourgogne-Franche-Comté in eastern France.

== See also ==
- Communes of the Haute-Saône department
