= Neurey-lès-la-Demie =

- Commune
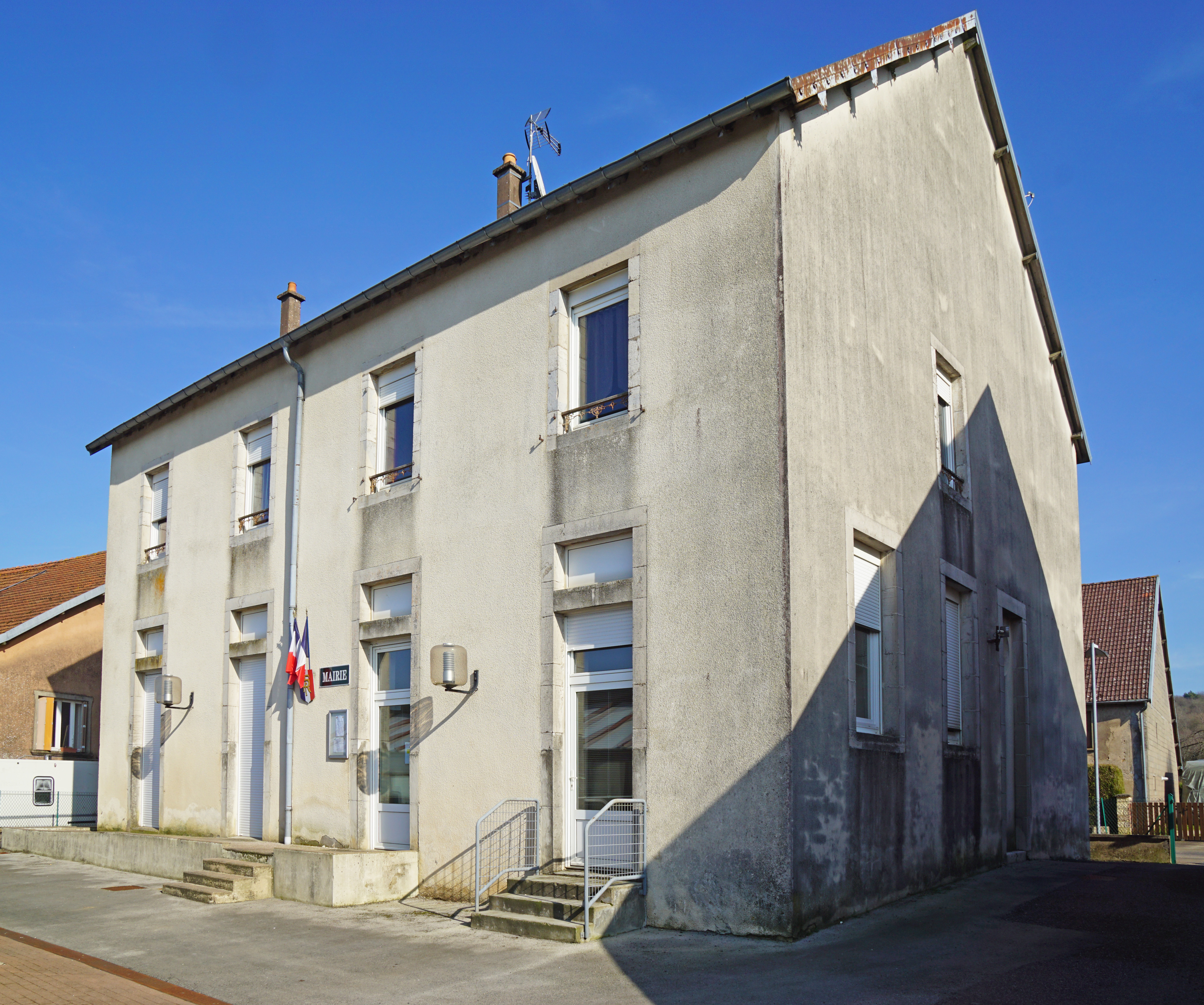
- The town hall in Neurey-lès-la-Demie

- Coat of arms
- Location of Neurey-lès-la-Demie
- Location within France Location within Bourgogne-Franche-Comté
- Coordinates: 47°34′33″N 6°11′41″E
- Country: France
- Region: Bourgogne-Franche-Comté
- Department: Haute-Saône
- Arrondissement: Vesoul
- Canton: Villersexel

Government
  - Mayor (2020–2026): Sabrina Fleurot
- Area^{1}: 9.70 km^{2} (3.75 sq mi)
- Highest elevation: 446 m (1,463 ft)
- Lowest elevation: 271 m (889 ft)
- Population (2023): 355
  - Density: 36.6/km^{2} (94.8/sq mi)
- Time zone: UTC+01:00 (CET)
  - Summer (DST): UTC+02:00 (CEST)
- INSEE/Postal code: 70381 /70000
- ^{1} French Land Register data, which excludes lakes, ponds, glaciers > 1 km^{2} (0.386 sq mi or 247 acres) and river estuaries.

Neurey-lès-la-Demie (French pronunciation: [nœʁɛ lɛ la dəmi], lit. 'Neurey near La Demie') is a commune in the Haute-Saône department in the region of Bourgogne-Franche-Comté in eastern France.

== See also ==
- Communes of the Haute-Saône department
