= Villers-le-Sec, Haute-Saône =

Villers-le-Sec
- Commune
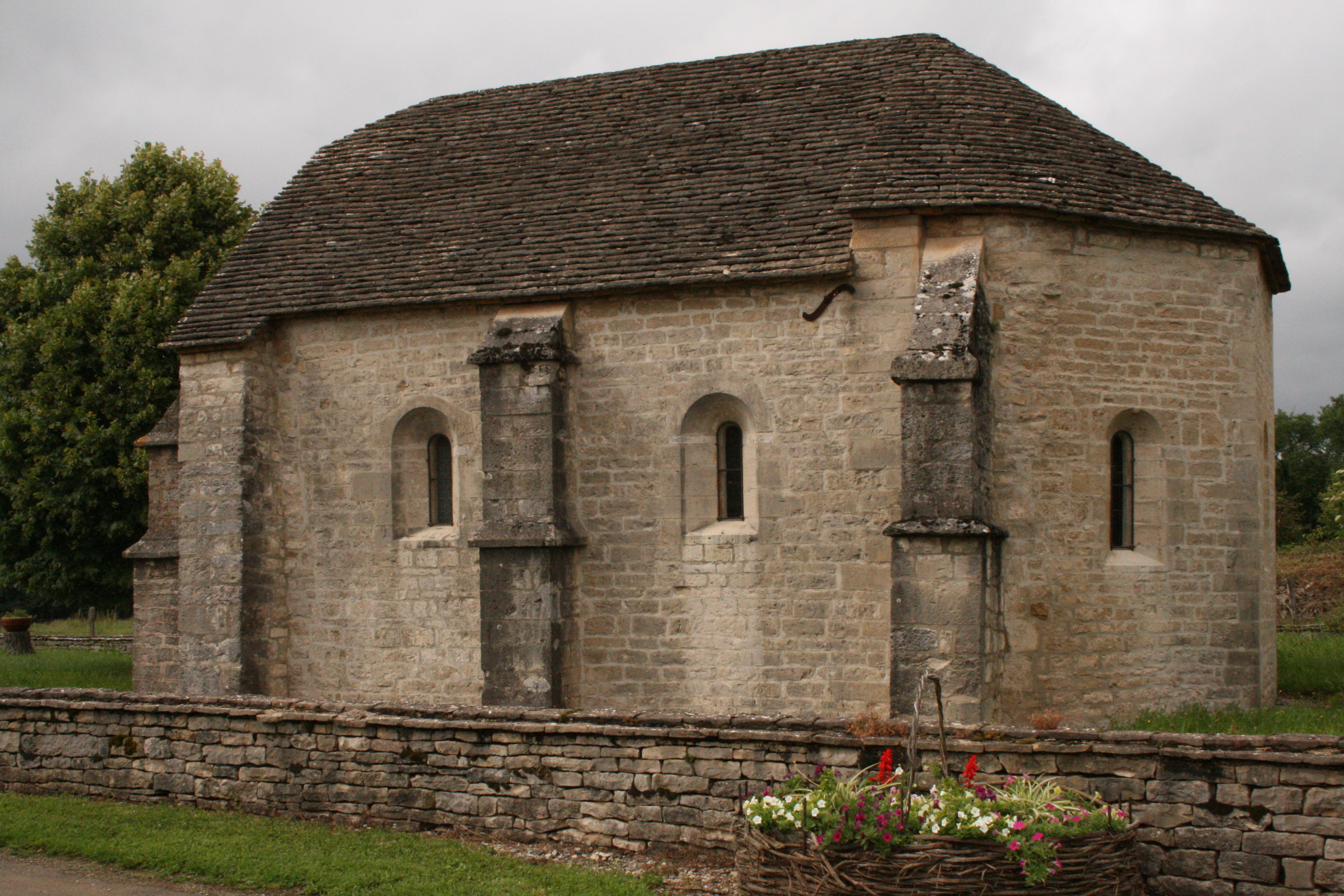
- The chapel in Villers-le-Sec

- Coat of arms
- Location of Villers-le-Sec
- Location within France Location within Bourgogne-Franche-Comté
- Coordinates: 47°36′00″N 6°13′14″E
- Country: France
- Region: Bourgogne-Franche-Comté
- Department: Haute-Saône
- Arrondissement: Vesoul
- Canton: Villersexel

Government
  - Mayor (2020–2026): Jean Drouhard
- Area^{1}: 11.11 km^{2} (4.29 sq mi)
- Highest elevation: 389 m (1,276 ft)
- Lowest elevation: 258 m (846 ft)
- Population (2023): 519
  - Density: 46.7/km^{2} (121/sq mi)
- Time zone: UTC+01:00 (CET)
  - Summer (DST): UTC+02:00 (CEST)
- INSEE/Postal code: 70563 /70000
- ^{1} French Land Register data, which excludes lakes, ponds, glaciers > 1 km^{2} (0.386 sq mi or 247 acres) and river estuaries.

Villers-le-Sec (French pronunciation: [vilɛʁ lə sɛk]) is a commune in the Haute-Saône department in the region of Bourgogne-Franche-Comté in eastern France.

== See also ==
- Communes of the Haute-Saône department
