= Granges-la-Ville =

- Commune
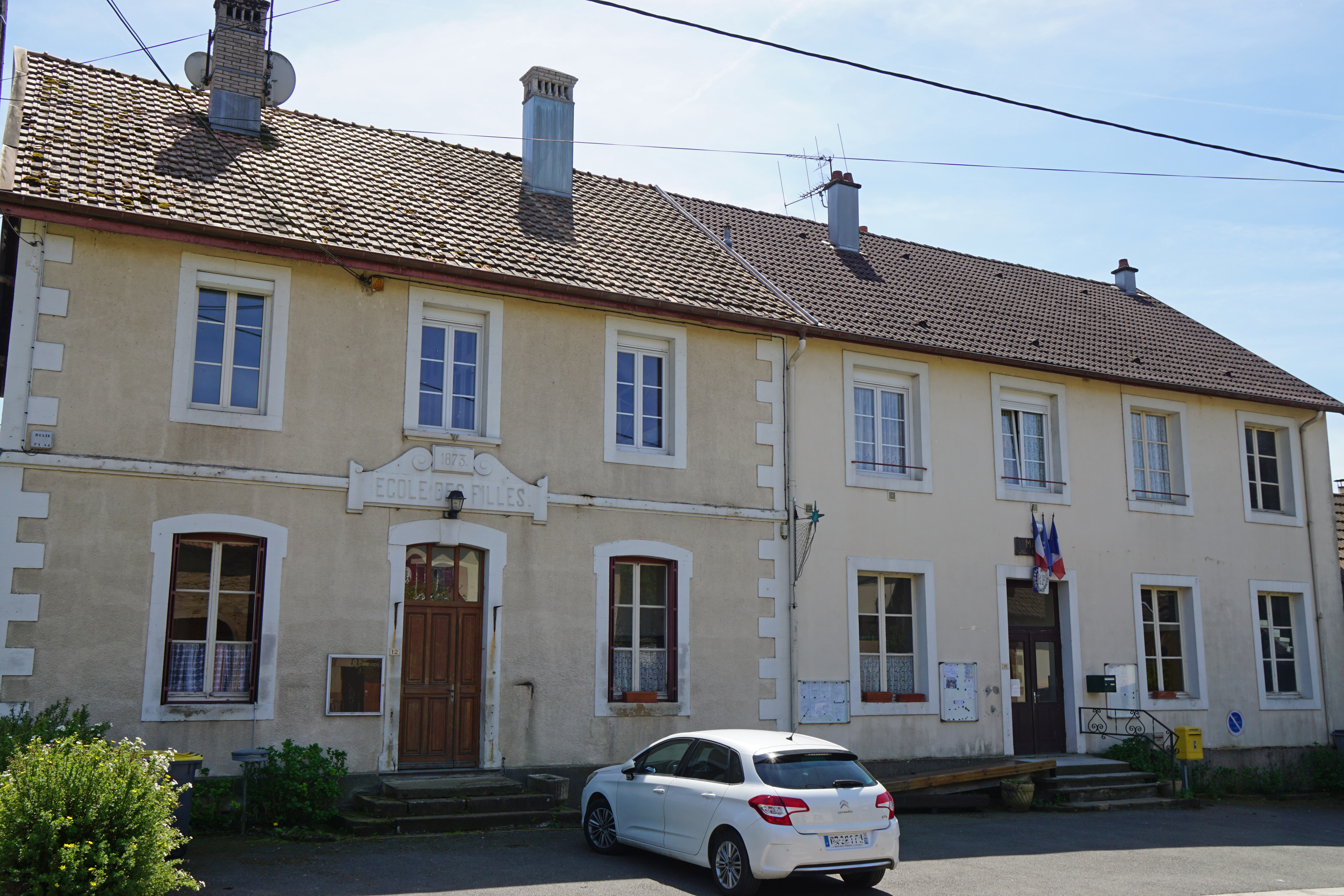
- The town hall in Granges-la-Ville

- Coat of arms
- Location of Granges-la-Ville
- Location within France Location within Bourgogne-Franche-Comté
- Coordinates: 47°34′02″N 6°34′23″E
- Country: France
- Region: Bourgogne-Franche-Comté
- Department: Haute-Saône
- Arrondissement: Lure
- Canton: Villersexel

Government
  - Mayor (2020–2026): Hugo Walz
- Area^{1}: 2.61 km^{2} (1.01 sq mi)
- Highest elevation: 406 m (1,332 ft)
- Lowest elevation: 285 m (935 ft)
- Population (2023): 181
  - Density: 69.3/km^{2} (180/sq mi)
- Time zone: UTC+01:00 (CET)
  - Summer (DST): UTC+02:00 (CEST)
- INSEE/Postal code: 70276 /70400
- ^{1} French Land Register data, which excludes lakes, ponds, glaciers > 1 km^{2} (0.386 sq mi or 247 acres) and river estuaries.

Granges-la-Ville (French pronunciation: [ɡʁɑ̃ʒ la vil]) is a commune in the Haute-Saône department in the region of Bourgogne-Franche-Comté in eastern France.

== See also ==
- Communes of the Haute-Saône department
