= La Vergenne =

- Commune
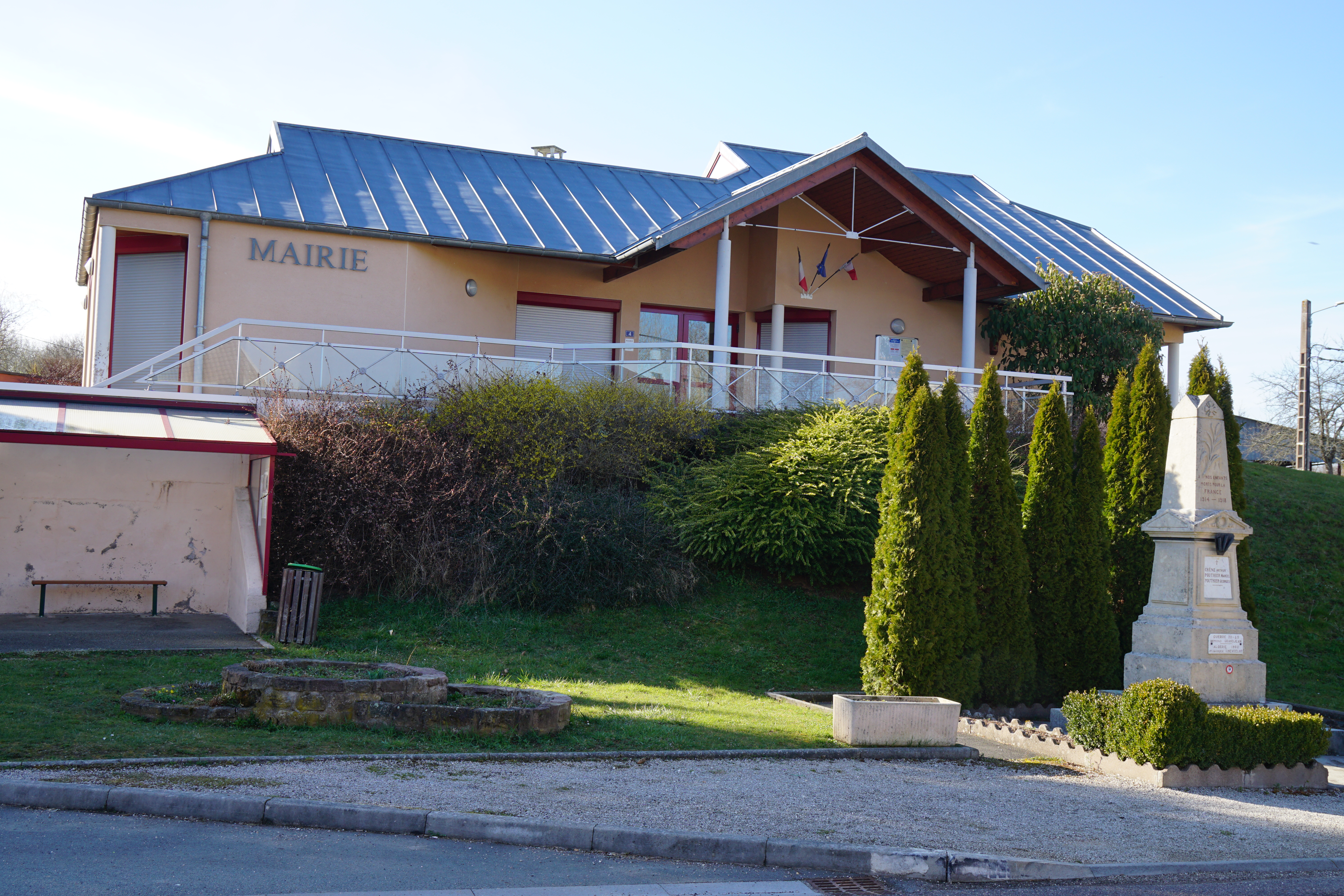
- The town hall in La Vergenne
- Location of La Vergenne
- Location within France Location within Bourgogne-Franche-Comté
- Coordinates: 47°36′41″N 6°31′28″E
- Country: France
- Region: Bourgogne-Franche-Comté
- Department: Haute-Saône
- Arrondissement: Lure
- Canton: Villersexel

Government
  - Mayor (2020–2026): Guy Levain
- Area^{1}: 2.95 km^{2} (1.14 sq mi)
- Highest elevation: 322 m (1,056 ft)
- Lowest elevation: 277 m (909 ft)
- Population (2023): 110
  - Density: 37/km^{2} (97/sq mi)
- Time zone: UTC+01:00 (CET)
  - Summer (DST): UTC+02:00 (CEST)
- INSEE/Postal code: 70544 /70200
- ^{1} French Land Register data, which excludes lakes, ponds, glaciers > 1 km^{2} (0.386 sq mi or 247 acres) and river estuaries.

La Vergenne (French pronunciation: [la vɛʁʒɛn]) is a commune in the Haute-Saône department in the region of Bourgogne-Franche-Comté in eastern France.

== Population ==
According to recent statistics, the commune of La Vergenne is small, with a population of approximately 110 inhabitants.

The town features a low population density due to its small area (about 2.95 km²) and rural character, with residential settlements dispersed among farms and individual houses.

== See also ==
- Communes of the Haute-Saône department
