= Pont-sur-l'Ognon =

- Commune
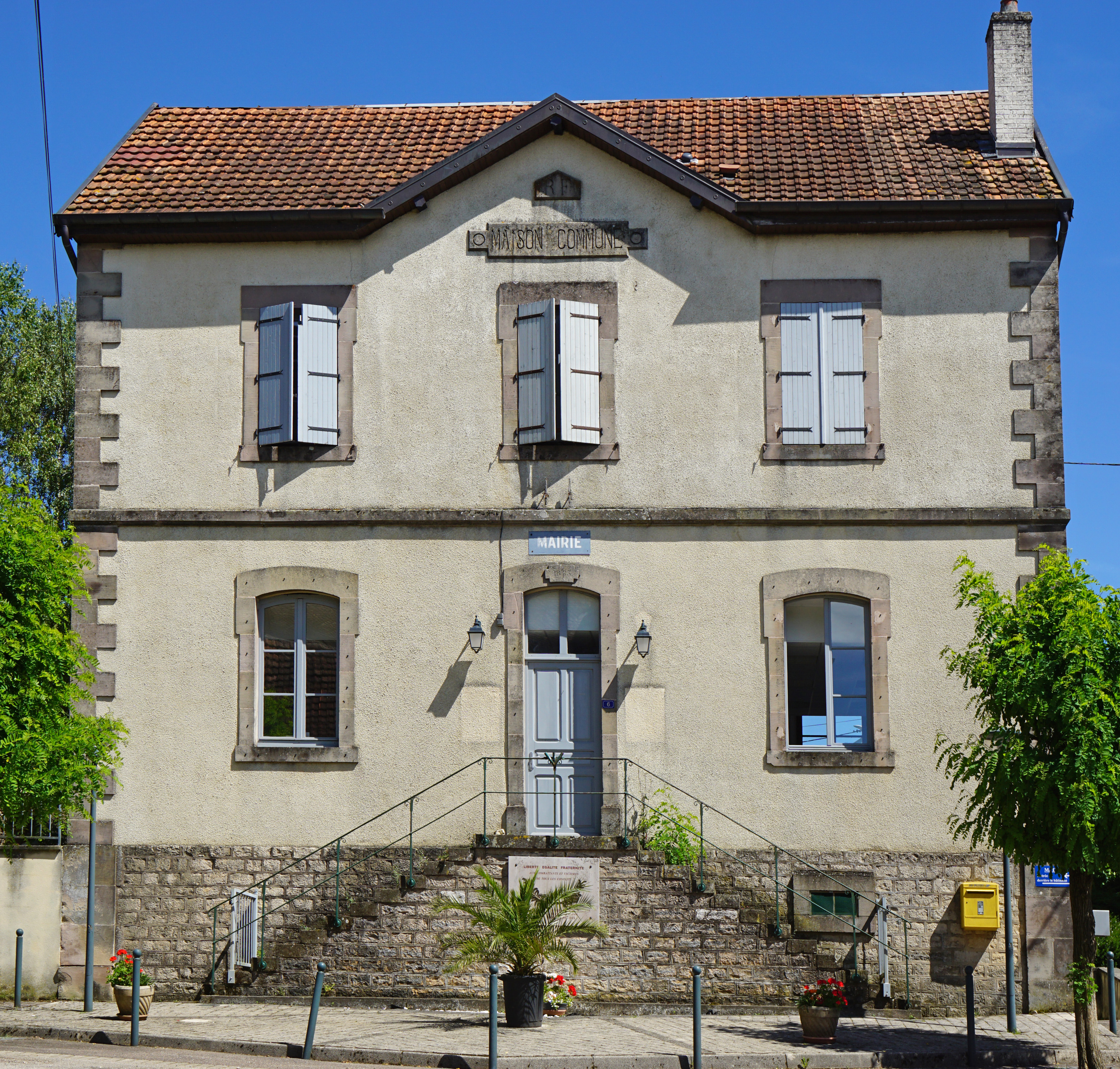
- The town hall in Pont-sur-l'Ognon

- Coat of arms
- Location of Pont-sur-l'Ognon
- Location within France Location within Bourgogne-Franche-Comté
- Coordinates: 47°31′19″N 6°23′19″E
- Country: France
- Region: Bourgogne-Franche-Comté
- Department: Haute-Saône
- Arrondissement: Lure
- Canton: Villersexel

Government
  - Mayor (2020–2026): Annie Clerc
- Area^{1}: 4.16 km^{2} (1.61 sq mi)
- Highest elevation: 315 m (1,033 ft)
- Lowest elevation: 253 m (830 ft)
- Population (2023): 62
  - Density: 15/km^{2} (39/sq mi)
- Time zone: UTC+01:00 (CET)
  - Summer (DST): UTC+02:00 (CEST)
- INSEE/Postal code: 70420 /70110
- ^{1} French Land Register data, which excludes lakes, ponds, glaciers > 1 km^{2} (0.386 sq mi or 247 acres) and river estuaries.

Pont-sur-l'Ognon (French pronunciation: [pɔ̃ syʁ lɔɲɔ̃], literally Bridge on the Ognon) is a commune in the Haute-Saône department in the region of Bourgogne-Franche-Comté in eastern France.

== See also ==
- Communes of the Haute-Saône department
