= Villargent =

- Commune
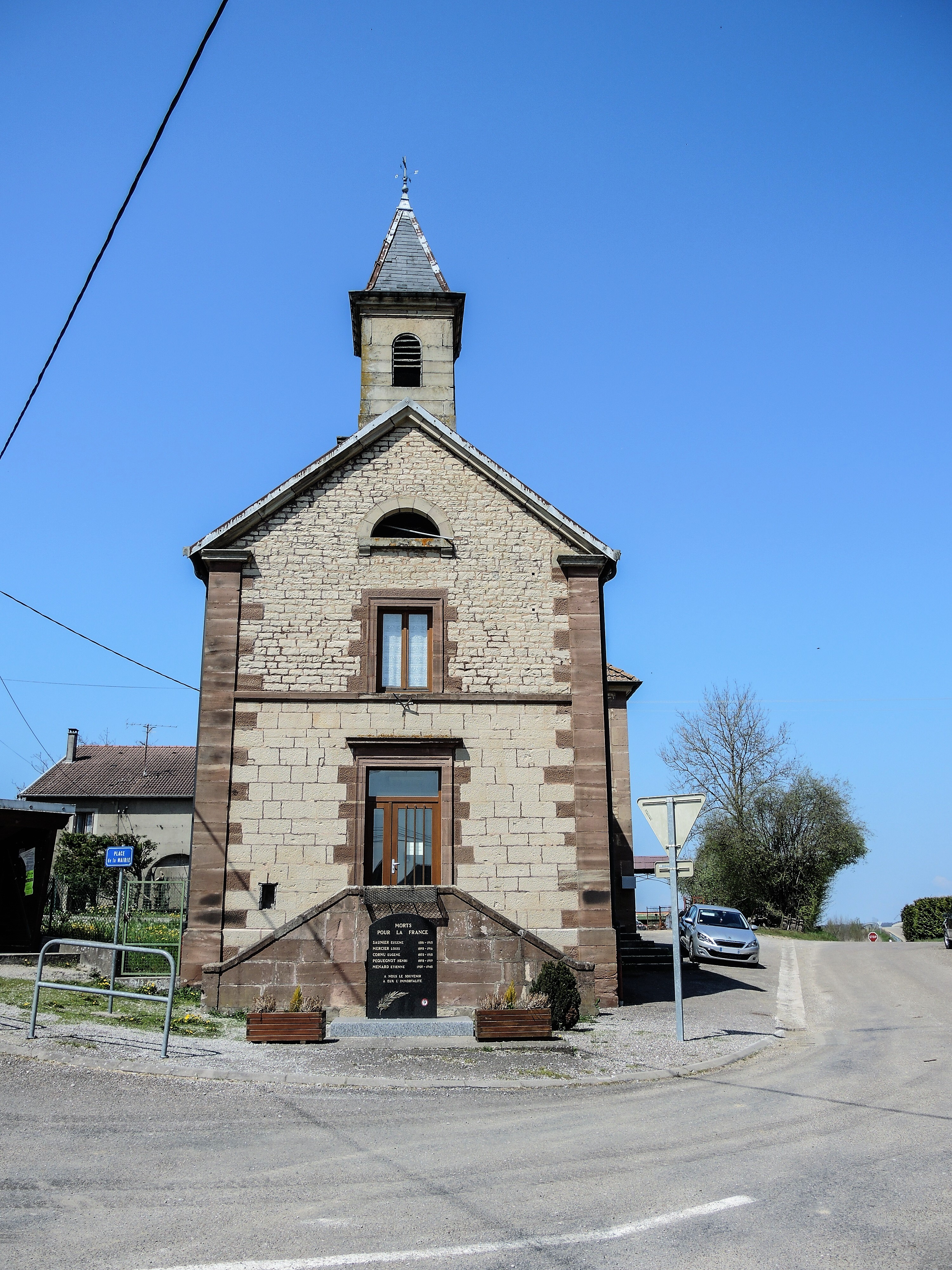
- The town hall in Villargent
- Location of Villargent
- Location within France Location within Bourgogne-Franche-Comté
- Coordinates: 47°32′32″N 6°29′11″E
- Country: France
- Region: Bourgogne-Franche-Comté
- Department: Haute-Saône
- Arrondissement: Lure
- Canton: Villersexel
- Area^{1}: 2.86 km^{2} (1.10 sq mi)
- Highest elevation: 300 m (980 ft)
- Lowest elevation: 274 m (899 ft)
- Population (2023): 117
  - Density: 40.9/km^{2} (106/sq mi)
- Time zone: UTC+01:00 (CET)
  - Summer (DST): UTC+02:00 (CEST)
- INSEE/Postal code: 70553 /70110
- ^{1} French Land Register data, which excludes lakes, ponds, glaciers > 1 km^{2} (0.386 sq mi or 247 acres) and river estuaries.

Villargent is a commune in the Haute-Saône department in the region of Bourgogne-Franche-Comté in eastern France.

== See also ==
- Communes of the Haute-Saône department
