= Les Magny =

- Commune
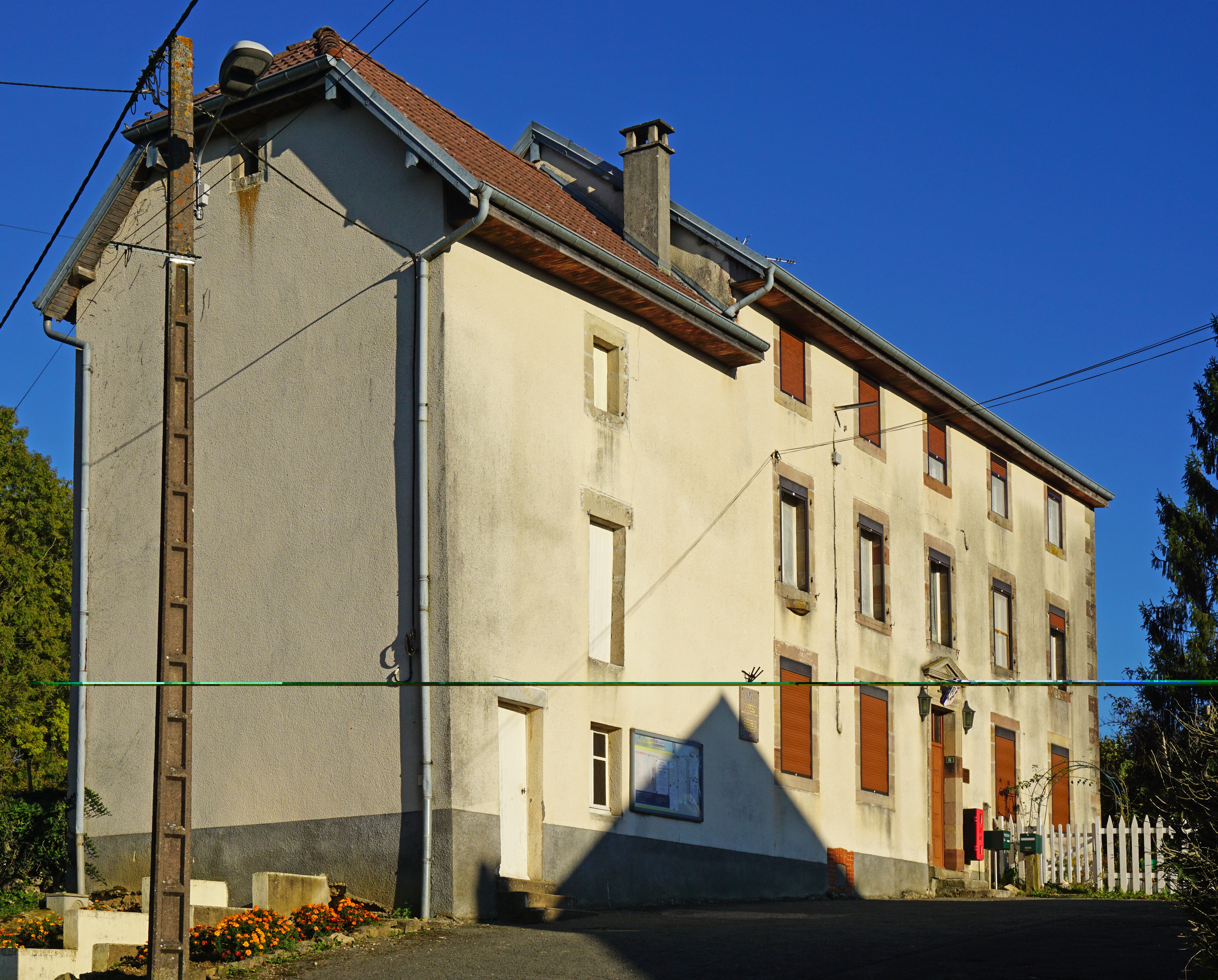
- The town hall in Les Magny
- Location of Les Magny
- Location within France Location within Bourgogne-Franche-Comté
- Coordinates: 47°31′38″N 6°27′16″E
- Country: France
- Region: Bourgogne-Franche-Comté
- Department: Haute-Saône
- Arrondissement: Lure
- Canton: Villersexel
- Area^{1}: 11.46 km^{2} (4.42 sq mi)
- Highest elevation: 387 m (1,270 ft)
- Lowest elevation: 256 m (840 ft)
- Population (2023): 142
  - Density: 12.4/km^{2} (32.1/sq mi)
- Time zone: UTC+01:00 (CET)
  - Summer (DST): UTC+02:00 (CEST)
- INSEE/Postal code: 70317 /70110
- ^{1} French Land Register data, which excludes lakes, ponds, glaciers > 1 km^{2} (0.386 sq mi or 247 acres) and river estuaries.

Les Magny (French pronunciation: [le maɲi]) is a commune in the Haute-Saône department in the region of Bourgogne-Franche-Comté in eastern France.

== See also ==
- Communes of the Haute-Saône department
