= Aillevans =

- Commune
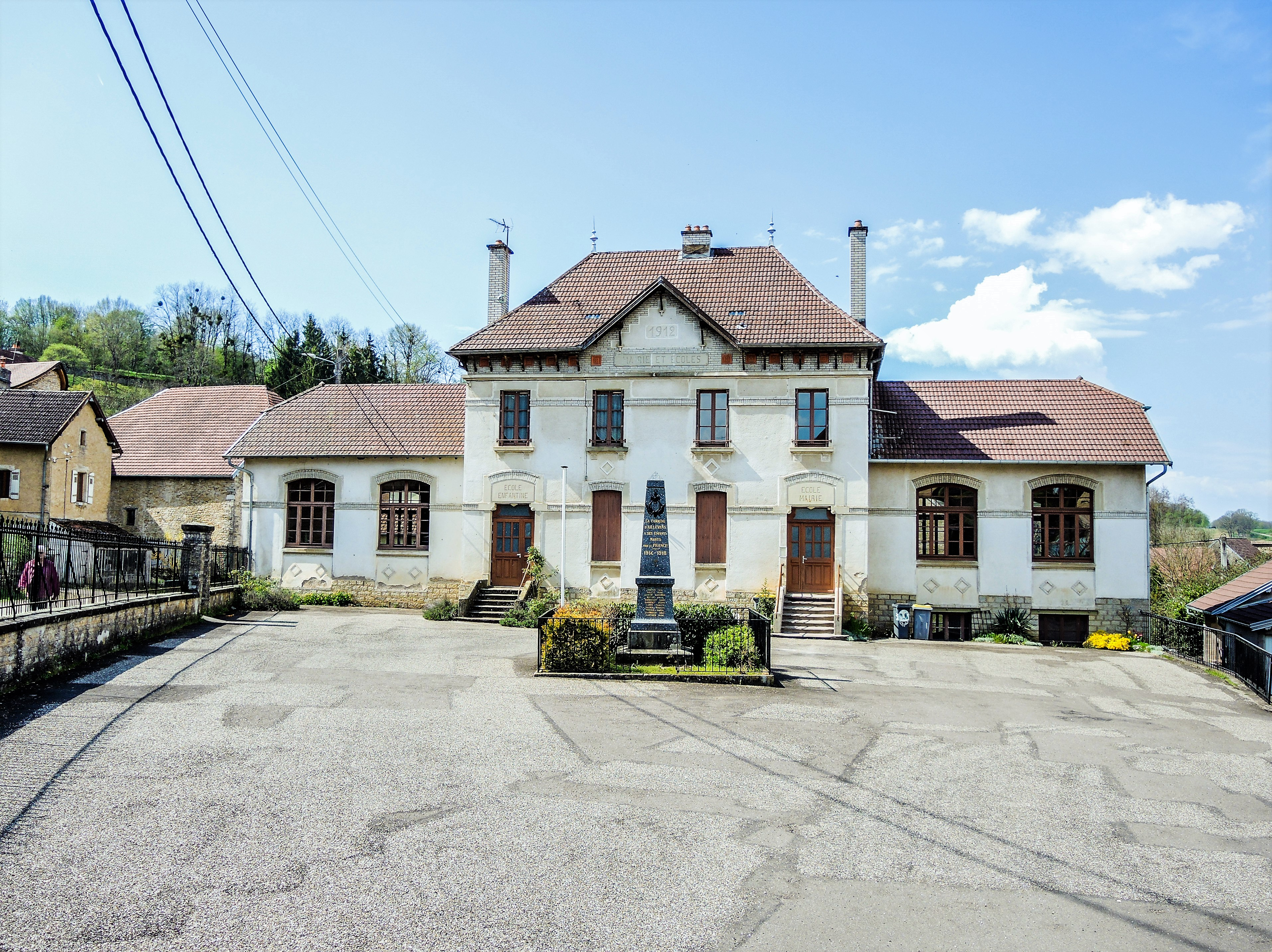
- The town hall and school in Aillevans

- Coat of arms
- Location of Aillevans
- Location within France Location within Bourgogne-Franche-Comté
- Coordinates: 47°35′32″N 6°24′57″E
- Country: France
- Region: Bourgogne-Franche-Comté
- Department: Haute-Saône
- Arrondissement: Lure
- Canton: Villersexel
- Intercommunality: Pays de Villersexel

Government
  - Mayor (2020–2026): Robert Badalamenti
- Area^{1}: 5.78 km^{2} (2.23 sq mi)
- Highest elevation: 393 m (1,289 ft)
- Lowest elevation: 267 m (876 ft)
- Population (2023): 131
  - Density: 22.7/km^{2} (58.7/sq mi)
- Time zone: UTC+01:00 (CET)
  - Summer (DST): UTC+02:00 (CEST)
- INSEE/Postal code: 70005 /70110
- ^{1} French Land Register data, which excludes lakes, ponds, glaciers > 1 km^{2} (0.386 sq mi or 247 acres) and river estuaries.

Aillevans (French pronunciation: [ajvɑ̃]) is a commune in the Haute-Saône department in the region of Bourgogne-Franche-Comté in eastern France.

== Population ==
Historical population
Year	Pop.	±% p.a.
1968	166	—
1975	144	−2.01%
1982	162	+1.70%
1990	140	−1.81%
1999	122	−1.52%
2007	138	+1.55%
2012	143	+0.71%
2017	148	+0.69%
2023	131	−2.01%
Source: INSEE

== See also ==
- Communes of the Haute-Saône department
