= Colombotte =

- Commune
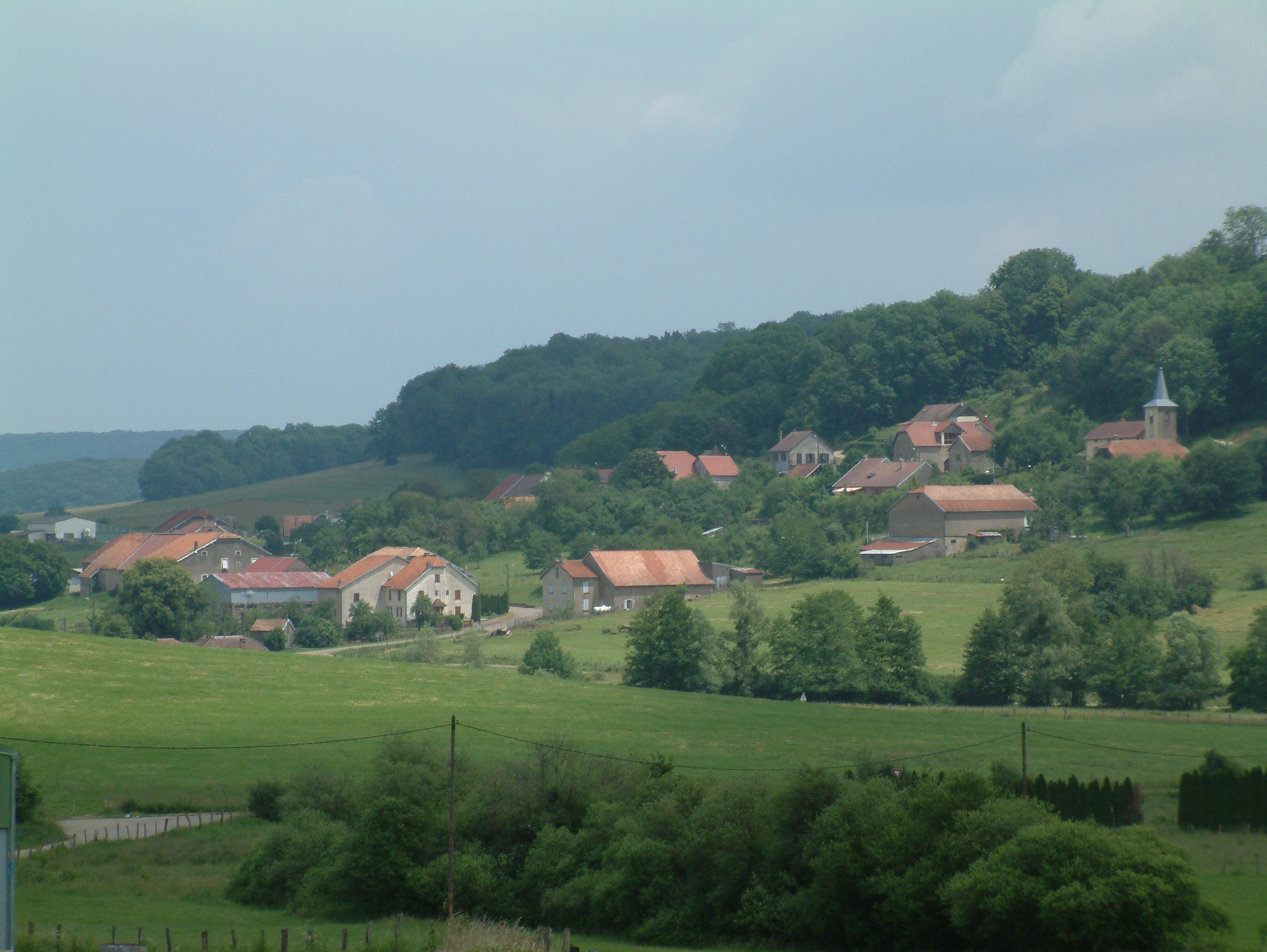
- A general view of Colombotte

- Coat of arms
- Location of Colombotte
- Location within France Location within Bourgogne-Franche-Comté
- Coordinates: 47°39′45″N 6°17′06″E
- Country: France
- Region: Bourgogne-Franche-Comté
- Department: Haute-Saône
- Arrondissement: Vesoul
- Canton: Villersexel

Government
  - Mayor (2022–2026): Nicolas Paillottet
- Area^{1}: 4.35 km^{2} (1.68 sq mi)
- Highest elevation: 376 m (1,234 ft)
- Lowest elevation: 272 m (892 ft)
- Population (2023): 66
  - Density: 15/km^{2} (39/sq mi)
- Time zone: UTC+01:00 (CET)
  - Summer (DST): UTC+02:00 (CEST)
- INSEE/Postal code: 70164 /70240
- ^{1} French Land Register data, which excludes lakes, ponds, glaciers > 1 km^{2} (0.386 sq mi or 247 acres) and river estuaries.

Colombotte (French pronunciation: [kɔlɔ̃bɔt]) is a commune in the Haute-Saône department in the region of Bourgogne-Franche-Comté in eastern France.

== See also ==
- Communes of the Haute-Saône department
