= Vallerois-le-Bois =

- Commune
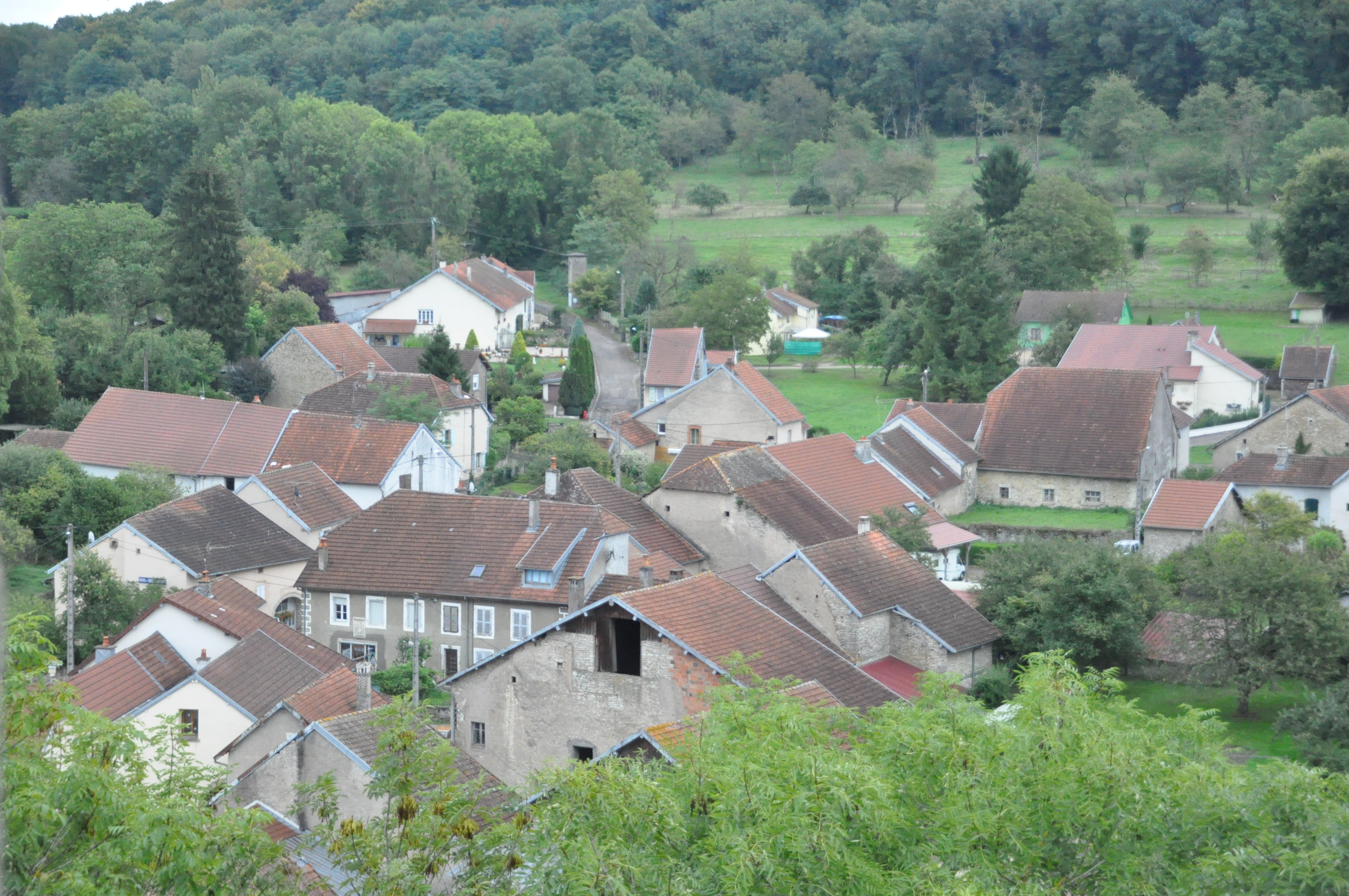
- A general view of Vallerois-le-Bois
- Location of Vallerois-le-Bois
- Location within France Location within Bourgogne-Franche-Comté
- Coordinates: 47°32′58″N 6°17′23″E
- Country: France
- Region: Bourgogne-Franche-Comté
- Department: Haute-Saône
- Arrondissement: Vesoul
- Canton: Villersexel

Government
  - Mayor (2020–2026): Romain Wicky
- Area^{1}: 12.59 km^{2} (4.86 sq mi)
- Highest elevation: 401 m (1,316 ft)
- Lowest elevation: 275 m (902 ft)
- Population (2023): 226
  - Density: 18.0/km^{2} (46.5/sq mi)
- Time zone: UTC+01:00 (CET)
  - Summer (DST): UTC+02:00 (CEST)
- INSEE/Postal code: 70516 /70000
- ^{1} French Land Register data, which excludes lakes, ponds, glaciers > 1 km^{2} (0.386 sq mi or 247 acres) and river estuaries.

Vallerois-le-Bois (French pronunciation: [valʁwa lə bwa]) is a commune in the Haute-Saône department in the region of Bourgogne-Franche-Comté in eastern France.

== See also ==
- Communes of the Haute-Saône department
