= Longevelle =

- Commune
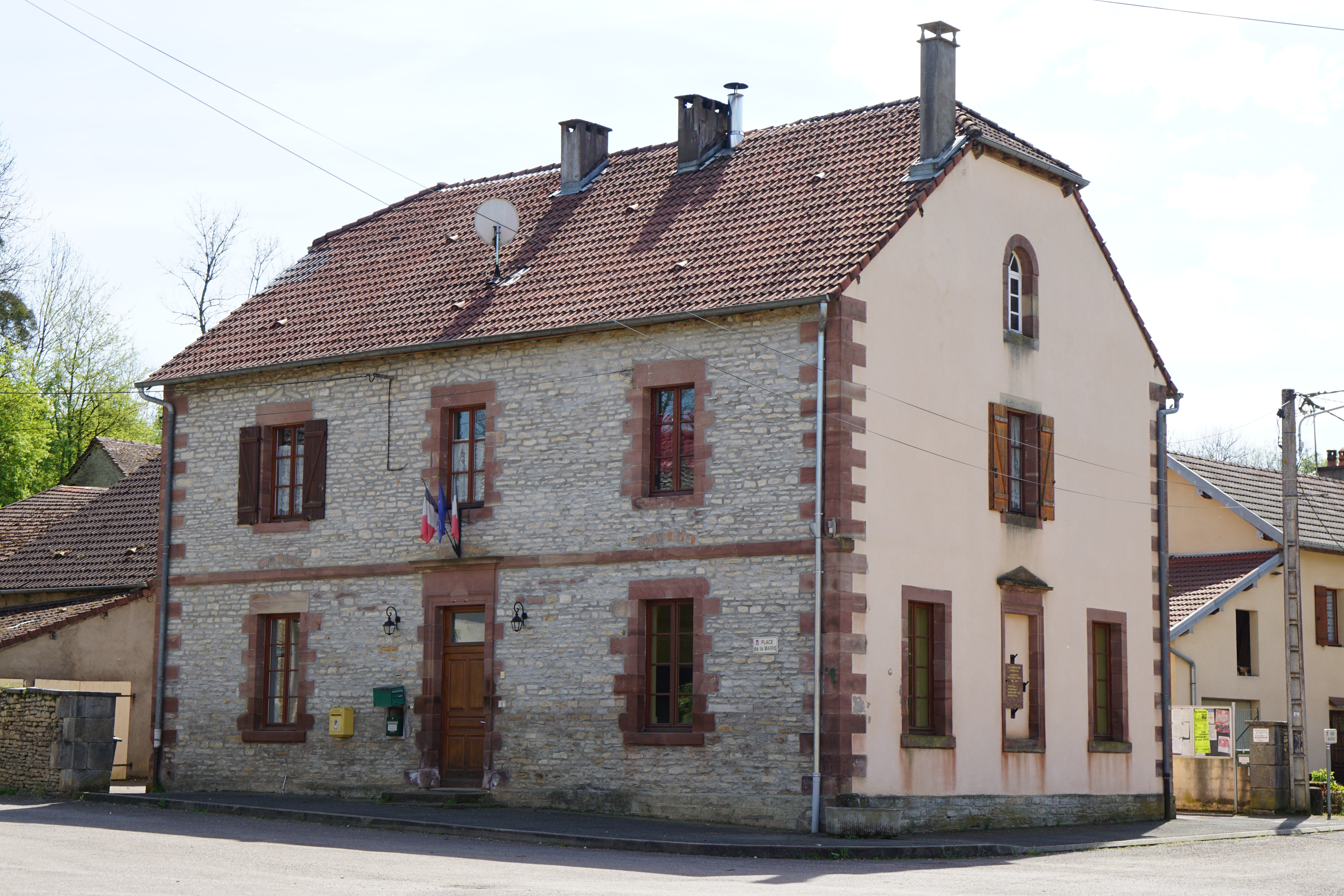
- The town hall in Longevelle

- Coat of arms
- Location of Longevelle
- Location within France Location within Bourgogne-Franche-Comté
- Coordinates: 47°35′27″N 6°26′54″E
- Country: France
- Region: Bourgogne-Franche-Comté
- Department: Haute-Saône
- Arrondissement: Lure
- Canton: Villersexel

Government
  - Mayor (2020–2026): Guy Saint Dizier
- Area^{1}: 4.10 km^{2} (1.58 sq mi)
- Highest elevation: 362 m (1,188 ft)
- Lowest elevation: 267 m (876 ft)
- Population (2023): 116
  - Density: 28.3/km^{2} (73.3/sq mi)
- Time zone: UTC+01:00 (CET)
  - Summer (DST): UTC+02:00 (CEST)
- INSEE/Postal code: 70307 /70110
- ^{1} French Land Register data, which excludes lakes, ponds, glaciers > 1 km^{2} (0.386 sq mi or 247 acres) and river estuaries.

Longevelle (French pronunciation: [lɔ̃ʒvɛl]) is a commune in the Haute-Saône département in the region of Bourgogne-Franche-Comté in eastern France.

== See also ==
- Communes of the Haute-Saône department
