= Saint-Ferjeux =

- Commune
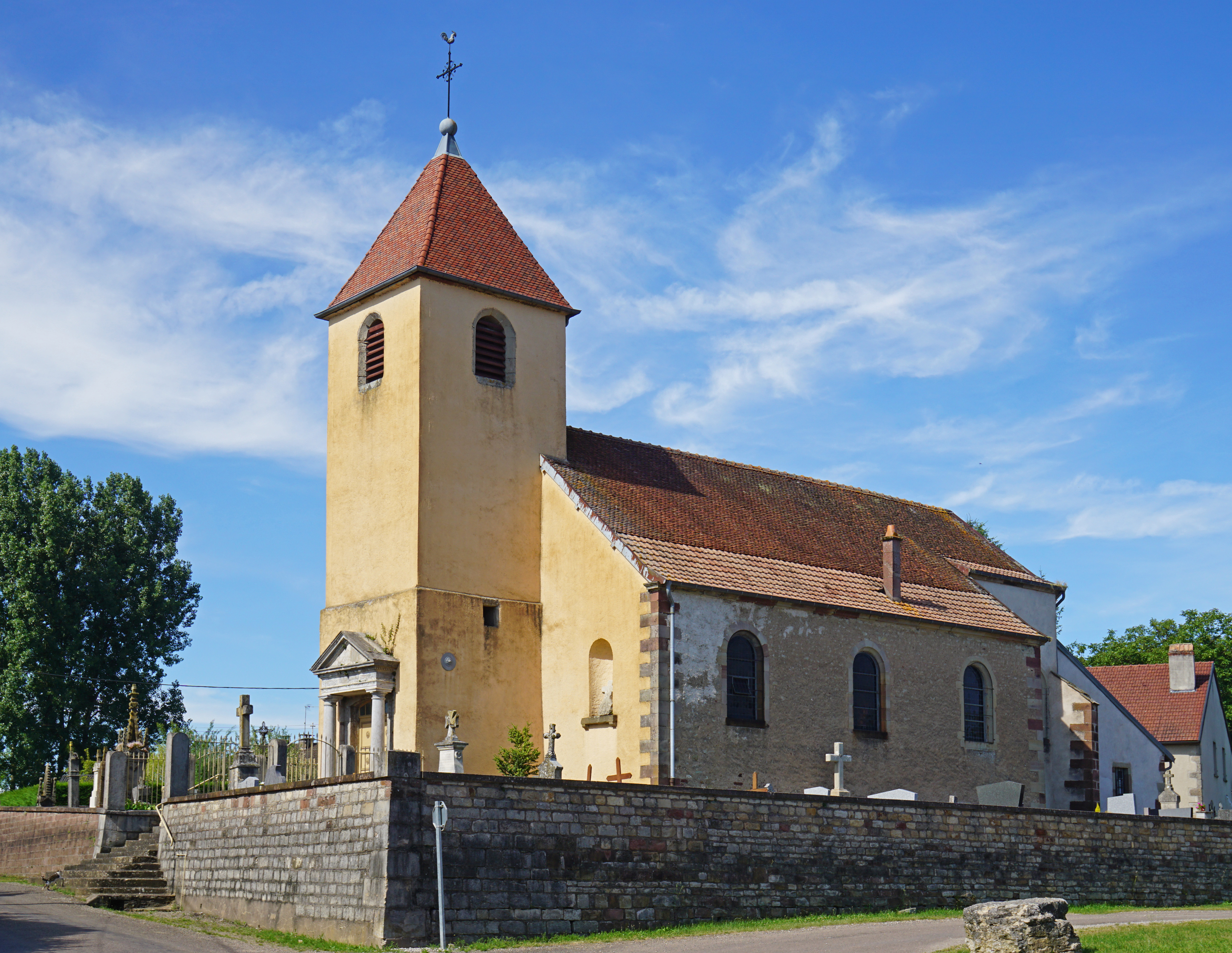
- The church in Saint-Ferjeux
- Location of Saint-Ferjeux
- Location within France Location within Bourgogne-Franche-Comté
- Coordinates: 47°32′39″N 6°30′38″E
- Country: France
- Region: Bourgogne-Franche-Comté
- Department: Haute-Saône
- Arrondissement: Lure
- Canton: Villersexel

Government
  - Mayor (2020–2026): Nadine Boucard
- Area^{1}: 1.77 km^{2} (0.68 sq mi)
- Highest elevation: 318 m (1,043 ft)
- Lowest elevation: 277 m (909 ft)
- Population (2023): 78
  - Density: 44/km^{2} (110/sq mi)
- Time zone: UTC+01:00 (CET)
  - Summer (DST): UTC+02:00 (CEST)
- INSEE/Postal code: 70462 /70110
- ^{1} French Land Register data, which excludes lakes, ponds, glaciers > 1 km^{2} (0.386 sq mi or 247 acres) and river estuaries.

Saint-Ferjeux (French pronunciation: [sɛ̃ fɛʁʒø]) is a commune in the Haute-Saône department in the region of Bourgogne-Franche-Comté in eastern France.

== See also ==
- Communes of the Haute-Saône department
