= Autrey-lès-Cerre =

- Commune
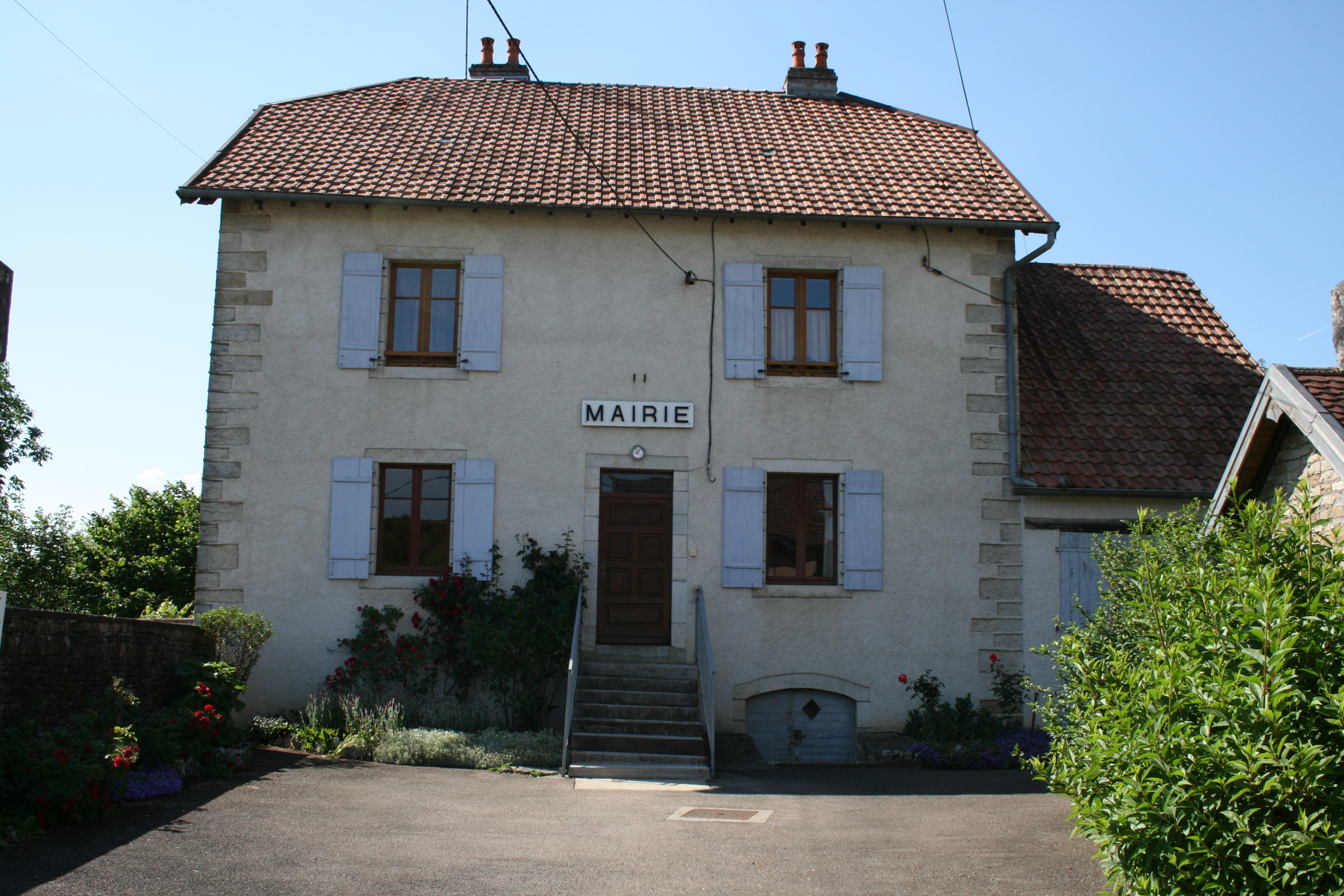
- The town hall in Autrey-lès-Cerre

- Coat of arms
- Location of Autrey-lès-Cerre
- Location within France Location within Bourgogne-Franche-Comté
- Coordinates: 47°36′35″N 6°20′55″E
- Country: France
- Region: Bourgogne-Franche-Comté
- Department: Haute-Saône
- Arrondissement: Vesoul
- Canton: Villersexel
- Intercommunality: CC Triangle Vert

Government
  - Mayor (2020–2026): Patrice Colney
- Area^{1}: 5.48 km^{2} (2.12 sq mi)
- Highest elevation: 426 m (1,398 ft)
- Lowest elevation: 300 m (980 ft)
- Population (2023): 240
  - Density: 44/km^{2} (110/sq mi)
- Time zone: UTC+01:00 (CET)
  - Summer (DST): UTC+02:00 (CEST)
- INSEE/Postal code: 70040 /70110
- ^{1} French Land Register data, which excludes lakes, ponds, glaciers > 1 km^{2} (0.386 sq mi or 247 acres) and river estuaries.

Autrey-lès-Cerre (French pronunciation: [otʁɛ lɛ sɛʁ], literally Autrey near Cerre) is a commune in the Haute-Saône department in the region of Bourgogne-Franche-Comté in eastern France.

== See also ==
- Communes of the Haute-Saône department
