= Calmoutier =

- Commune
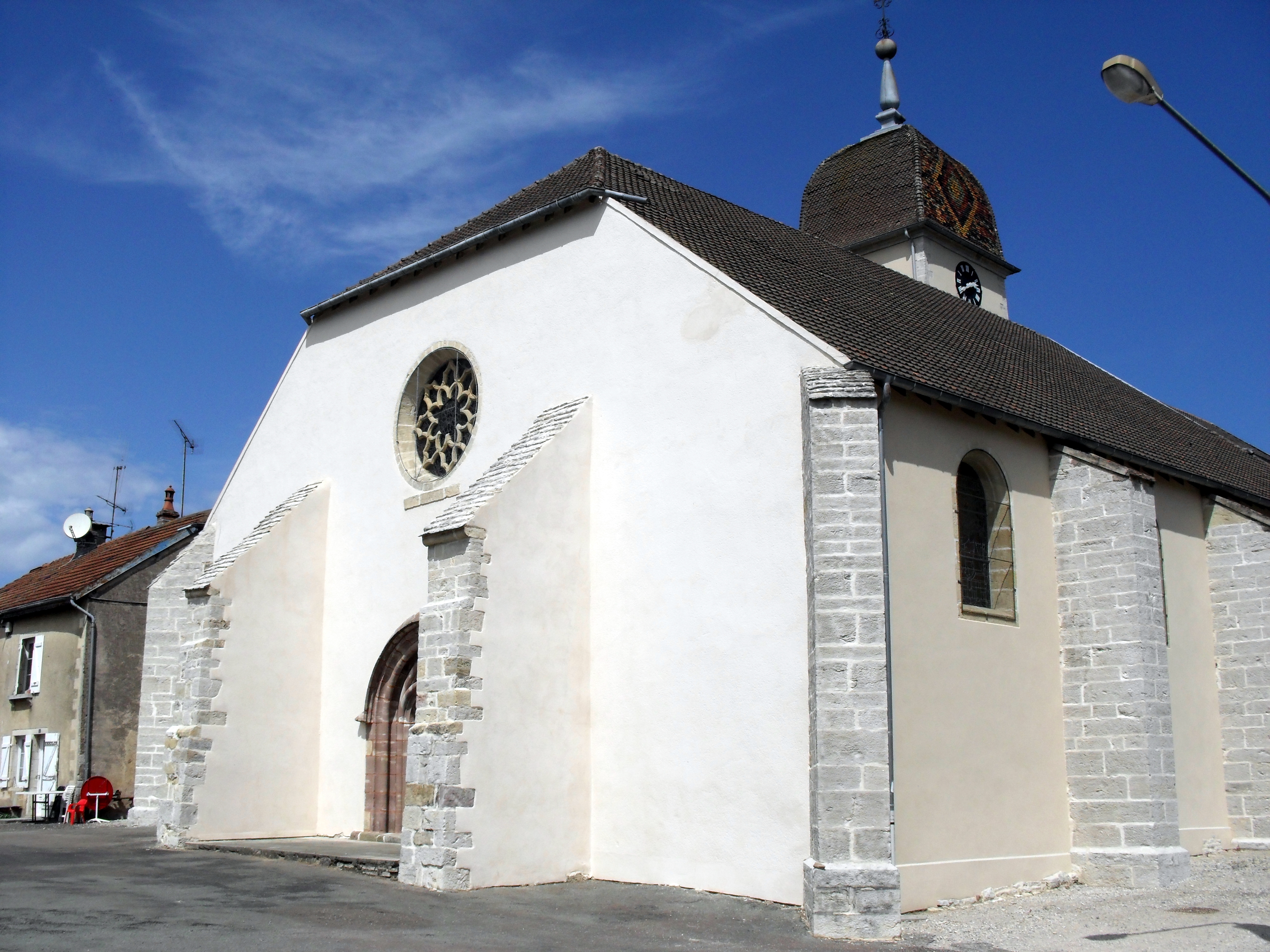
- The church in Calmoutier

- Coat of arms
- Location of Calmoutier
- Location within France Location within Bourgogne-Franche-Comté
- Coordinates: 47°38′42″N 6°16′45″E
- Country: France
- Region: Bourgogne-Franche-Comté
- Department: Haute-Saône
- Arrondissement: Vesoul
- Canton: Villersexel

Government
  - Mayor (2020–2026): Jean-Pierre Gasnet
- Area^{1}: 14.04 km^{2} (5.42 sq mi)
- Highest elevation: 390 m (1,280 ft)
- Lowest elevation: 258 m (846 ft)
- Population (2023): 263
  - Density: 18.7/km^{2} (48.5/sq mi)
- Time zone: UTC+01:00 (CET)
  - Summer (DST): UTC+02:00 (CEST)
- INSEE/Postal code: 70111 /70240
- ^{1} French Land Register data, which excludes lakes, ponds, glaciers > 1 km^{2} (0.386 sq mi or 247 acres) and river estuaries.

Calmoutier (French pronunciation: [kalmutje]) is a commune in the Haute-Saône department in the region of Bourgogne-Franche-Comté in eastern France.

== See also ==
- Communes of the Haute-Saône department
