= Liévans =

- Commune
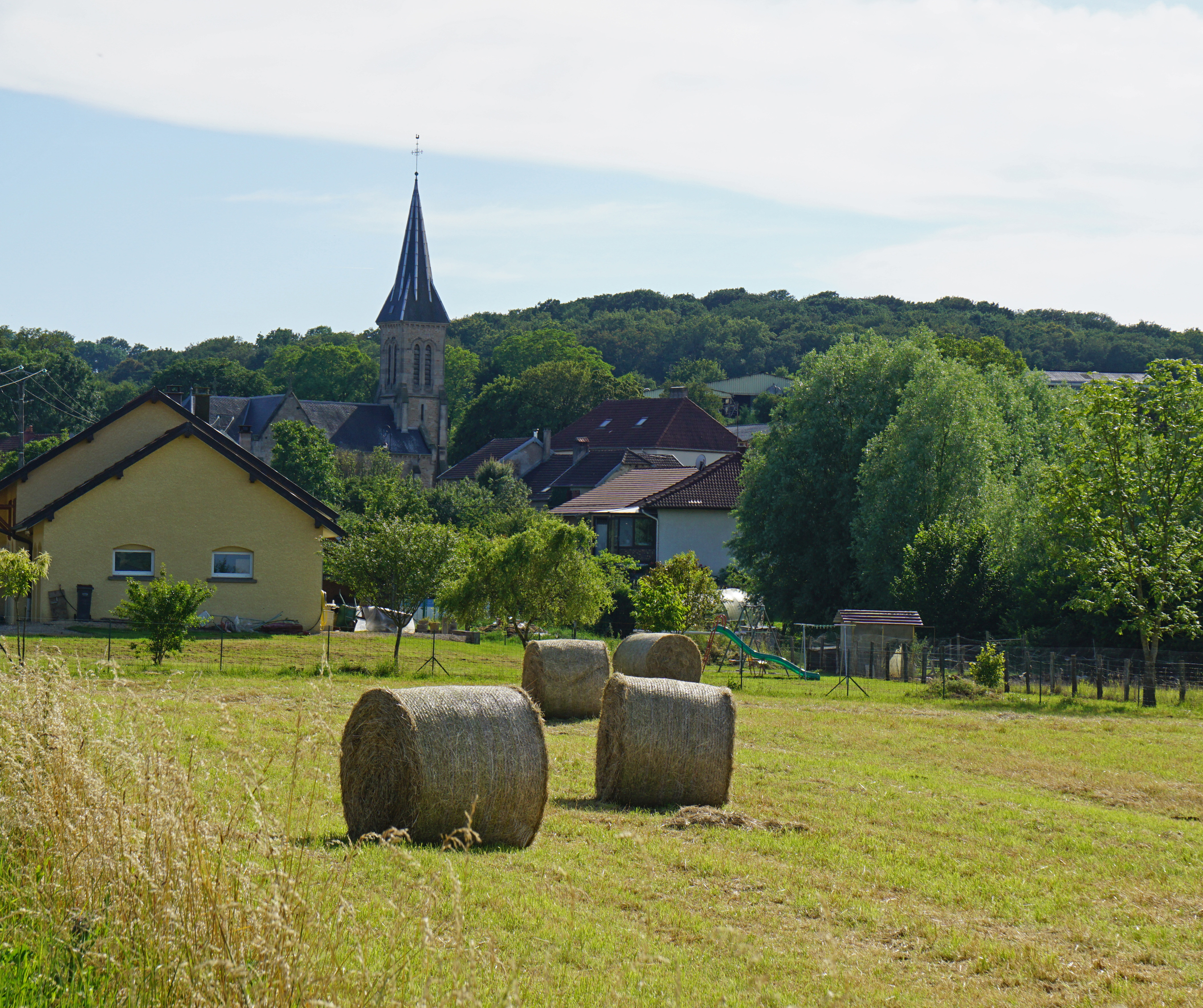
- A general view of Liévans
- Location of Liévans
- Location within France Location within Bourgogne-Franche-Comté
- Coordinates: 47°38′18″N 6°20′54″E
- Country: France
- Region: Bourgogne-Franche-Comté
- Department: Haute-Saône
- Arrondissement: Vesoul
- Canton: Villersexel

Government
  - Mayor (2020–2026): Bernard Gaudinet
- Area^{1}: 4.16 km^{2} (1.61 sq mi)
- Highest elevation: 370 m (1,210 ft)
- Lowest elevation: 290 m (950 ft)
- Population (2023): 152
  - Density: 36.5/km^{2} (94.6/sq mi)
- Time zone: UTC+01:00 (CET)
  - Summer (DST): UTC+02:00 (CEST)
- INSEE/Postal code: 70303 /70240
- ^{1} French Land Register data, which excludes lakes, ponds, glaciers > 1 km^{2} (0.386 sq mi or 247 acres) and river estuaries.

Liévans (French pronunciation: [ljevɑ̃]) is a commune in the Haute-Saône department in the region of Bourgogne-Franche-Comté in eastern France.

== See also ==
- Communes of the Haute-Saône department
