= Canton of Villersexel =

Coordinates: 47.55°N 6.43°E

The canton of Villersexel is an administrative division of the Haute-Saône department, northeastern France. Its borders were modified at the French canton reorganisation which came into effect in March 2015. Its seat is in Villersexel.

It consists of the following communes:

1. Aillevans
2. Athesans-Étroitefontaine
3. Autrey-le-Vay
4. Autrey-lès-Cerre
5. Belles-Fontaines
6. Beveuge
7. Borey
8. Calmoutier
9. Cerre-lès-Noroy
10. Colombe-lès-Vesoul
11. Colombotte
12. Crevans-et-la-Chapelle-lès-Granges
13. Dampvalley-lès-Colombe
14. La Demie
15. Esprels
16. Fallon
17. Gouhenans
18. Grammont
19. Granges-la-Ville
20. Granges-le-Bourg
21. Liévans
22. Longevelle
23. Les Magny
24. Marast
25. Mélecey
26. Mignavillers
27. Moimay
28. Montjustin-et-Velotte
29. Neurey-lès-la-Demie
30. Noroy-le-Bourg
31. Oppenans
32. Oricourt
33. Pont-sur-l'Ognon
34. Saint-Ferjeux
35. Saint-Sulpice
36. Secenans
37. Senargent-Mignafans
38. Vallerois-le-Bois
39. Vallerois-Lorioz
40. La Vergenne
41. Villafans
42. Villargent
43. Villers-la-Ville
44. Villers-le-Sec
45. Villersexel
