= Villers-la-Ville, Haute-Saône =

Villers-la-Ville
- Commune
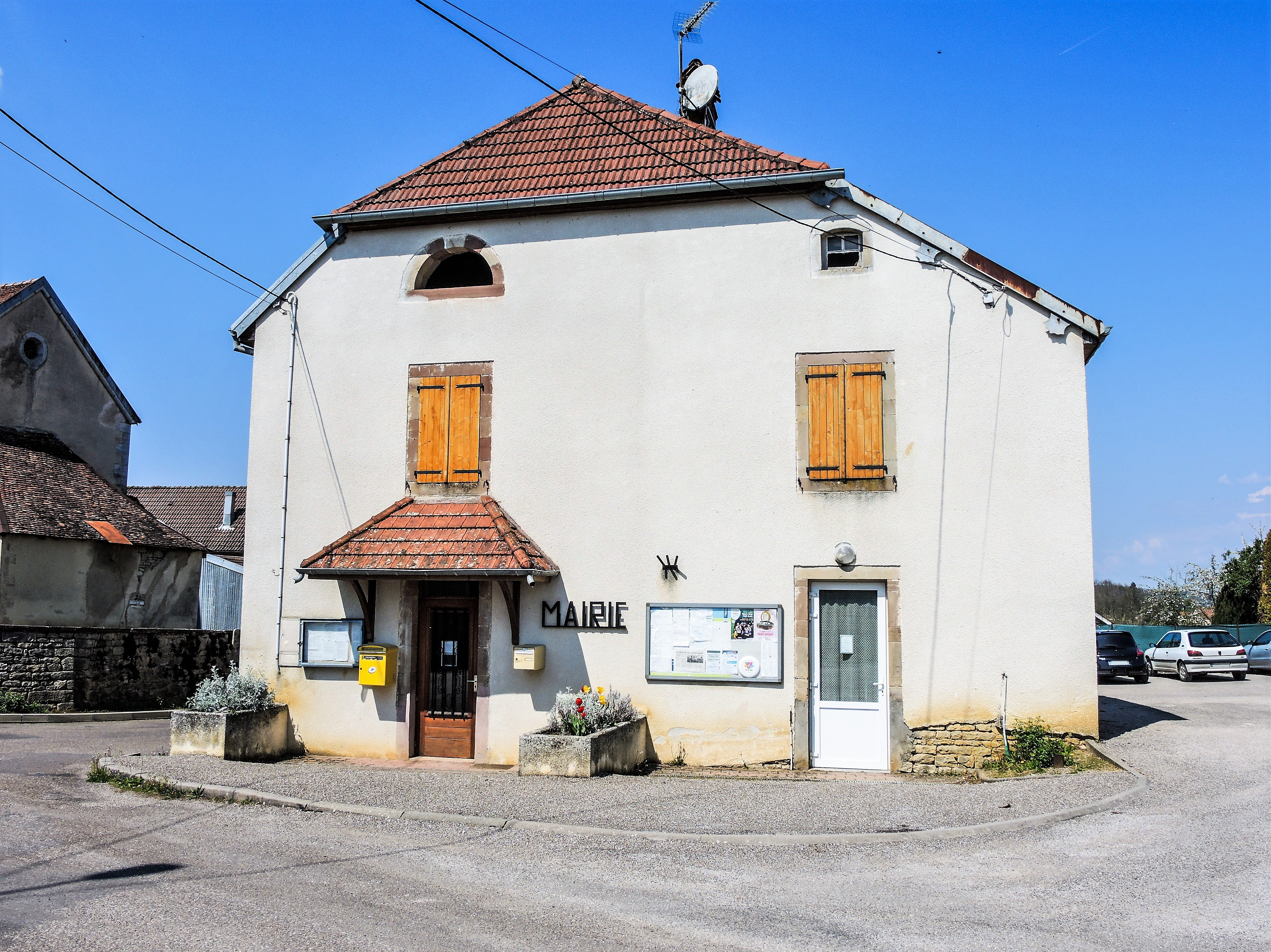
- The town hall in Villers-la-Ville
- Location of Villers-la-Ville
- Location within France Location within Bourgogne-Franche-Comté
- Coordinates: 47°32′58″N 6°27′46″E
- Country: France
- Region: Bourgogne-Franche-Comté
- Department: Haute-Saône
- Arrondissement: Lure
- Canton: Villersexel

Government
  - Mayor (2021–2026): Jacques Fournier
- Area^{1}: 5.87 km^{2} (2.27 sq mi)
- Highest elevation: 321 m (1,053 ft)
- Lowest elevation: 263 m (863 ft)
- Population (2023): 151
  - Density: 25.7/km^{2} (66.6/sq mi)
- Time zone: UTC+01:00 (CET)
  - Summer (DST): UTC+02:00 (CEST)
- INSEE/Postal code: 70562 /70110
- ^{1} French Land Register data, which excludes lakes, ponds, glaciers > 1 km^{2} (0.386 sq mi or 247 acres) and river estuaries.

Villers-la-Ville is a commune in the Haute-Saône department in the region of Bourgogne-Franche-Comté in eastern France.

== See also ==
- Communes of the Haute-Saône department
