= Secenans =

- Commune
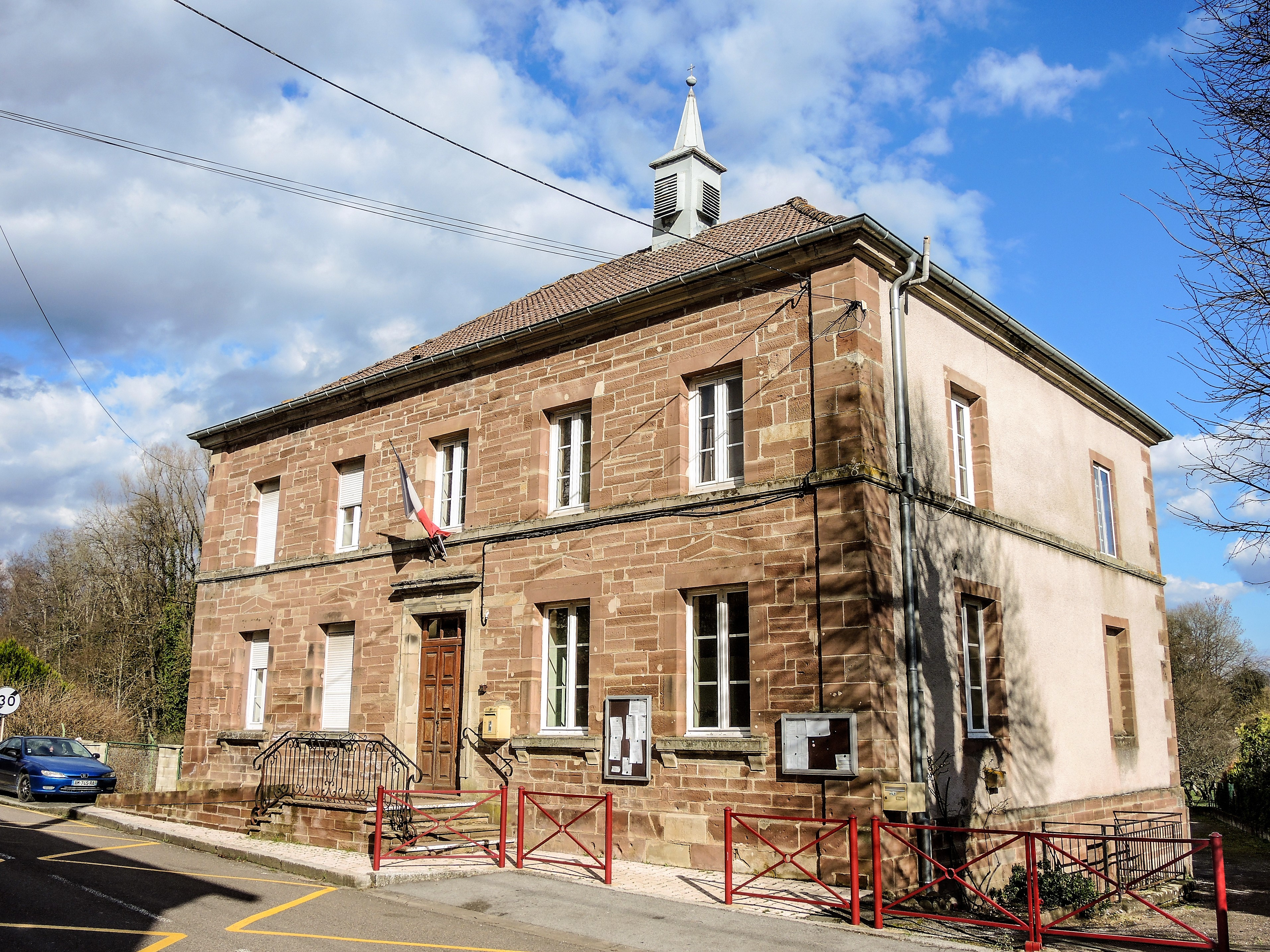
- The town hall in Secenans

- Coat of arms
- Location of Secenans
- Location within France Location within Bourgogne-Franche-Comté
- Coordinates: 47°33′15″N 6°34′31″E
- Country: France
- Region: Bourgogne-Franche-Comté
- Department: Haute-Saône
- Arrondissement: Lure
- Canton: Villersexel
- Area^{1}: 2.88 km^{2} (1.11 sq mi)
- Highest elevation: 383 m (1,257 ft)
- Lowest elevation: 293 m (961 ft)
- Population (2023): 183
  - Density: 63.5/km^{2} (165/sq mi)
- Time zone: UTC+01:00 (CET)
  - Summer (DST): UTC+02:00 (CEST)
- INSEE/Postal code: 70484 /70400
- ^{1} French Land Register data, which excludes lakes, ponds, glaciers > 1 km^{2} (0.386 sq mi or 247 acres) and river estuaries.

Secenans is a commune in the Haute-Saône department in the region of Bourgogne-Franche-Comté in eastern France.

== See also ==
- Communes of the Haute-Saône department
