= Vallerois-Lorioz =

- Commune
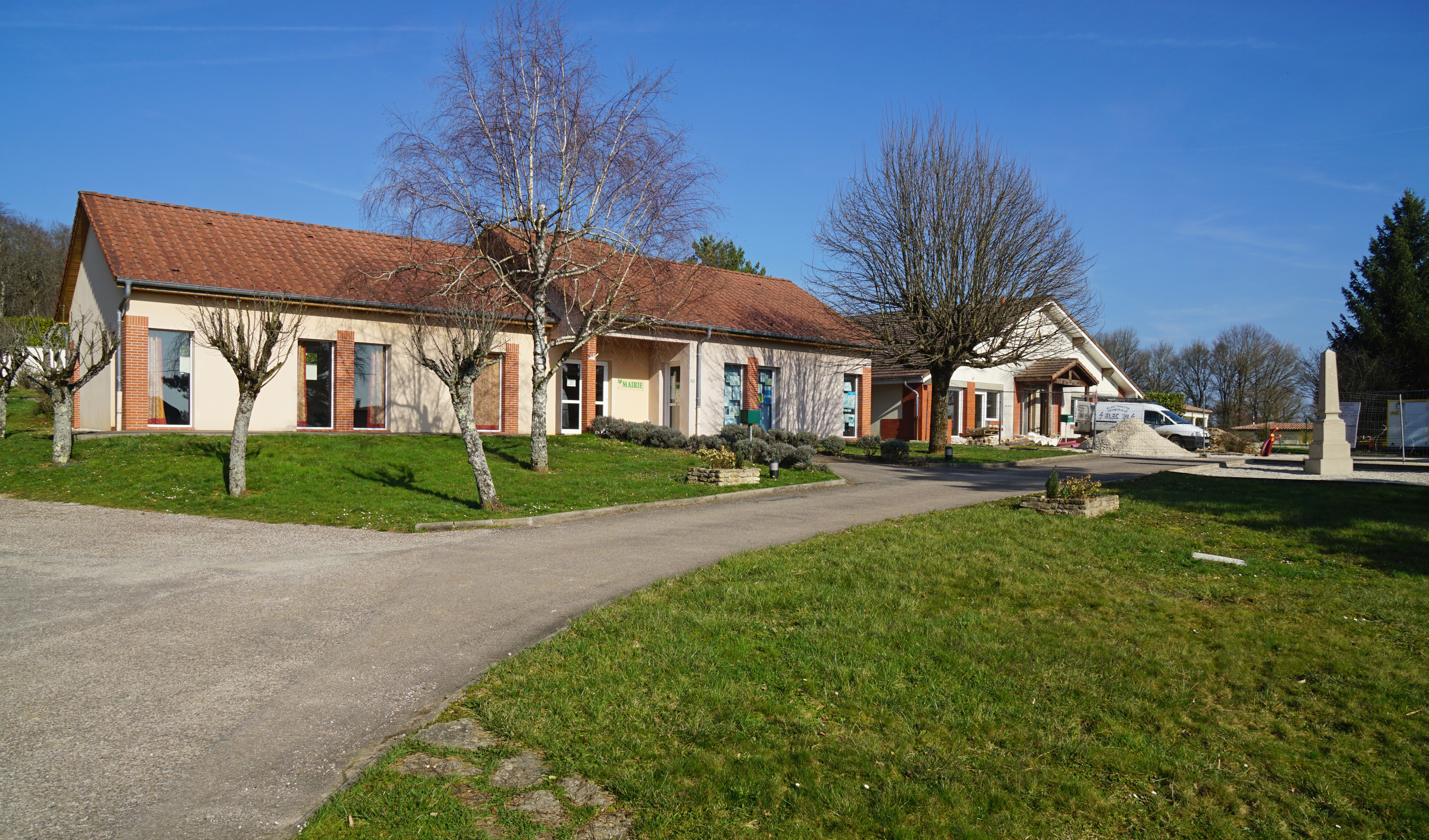
- The town hall in Vallerois-Lorioz

- Coat of arms
- Location of Vallerois-Lorioz
- Location within France Location within Bourgogne-Franche-Comté
- Coordinates: 47°33′52″N 6°09′04″E
- Country: France
- Region: Bourgogne-Franche-Comté
- Department: Haute-Saône
- Arrondissement: Vesoul
- Canton: Villersexel

Government
  - Mayor (2020–2026): Christian Silvain
- Area^{1}: 6.31 km^{2} (2.44 sq mi)
- Highest elevation: 430 m (1,410 ft)
- Lowest elevation: 305 m (1,001 ft)
- Population (2023): 452
  - Density: 71.6/km^{2} (186/sq mi)
- Time zone: UTC+01:00 (CET)
  - Summer (DST): UTC+02:00 (CEST)
- INSEE/Postal code: 70517 /70000
- ^{1} French Land Register data, which excludes lakes, ponds, glaciers > 1 km^{2} (0.386 sq mi or 247 acres) and river estuaries.

Vallerois-Lorioz (French pronunciation: [valʁwa lɔʁjo]) is a commune in the Haute-Saône department in the region of Bourgogne-Franche-Comté in eastern France.

== See also ==
- Communes of the Haute-Saône department
