= Moimay =

- Commune
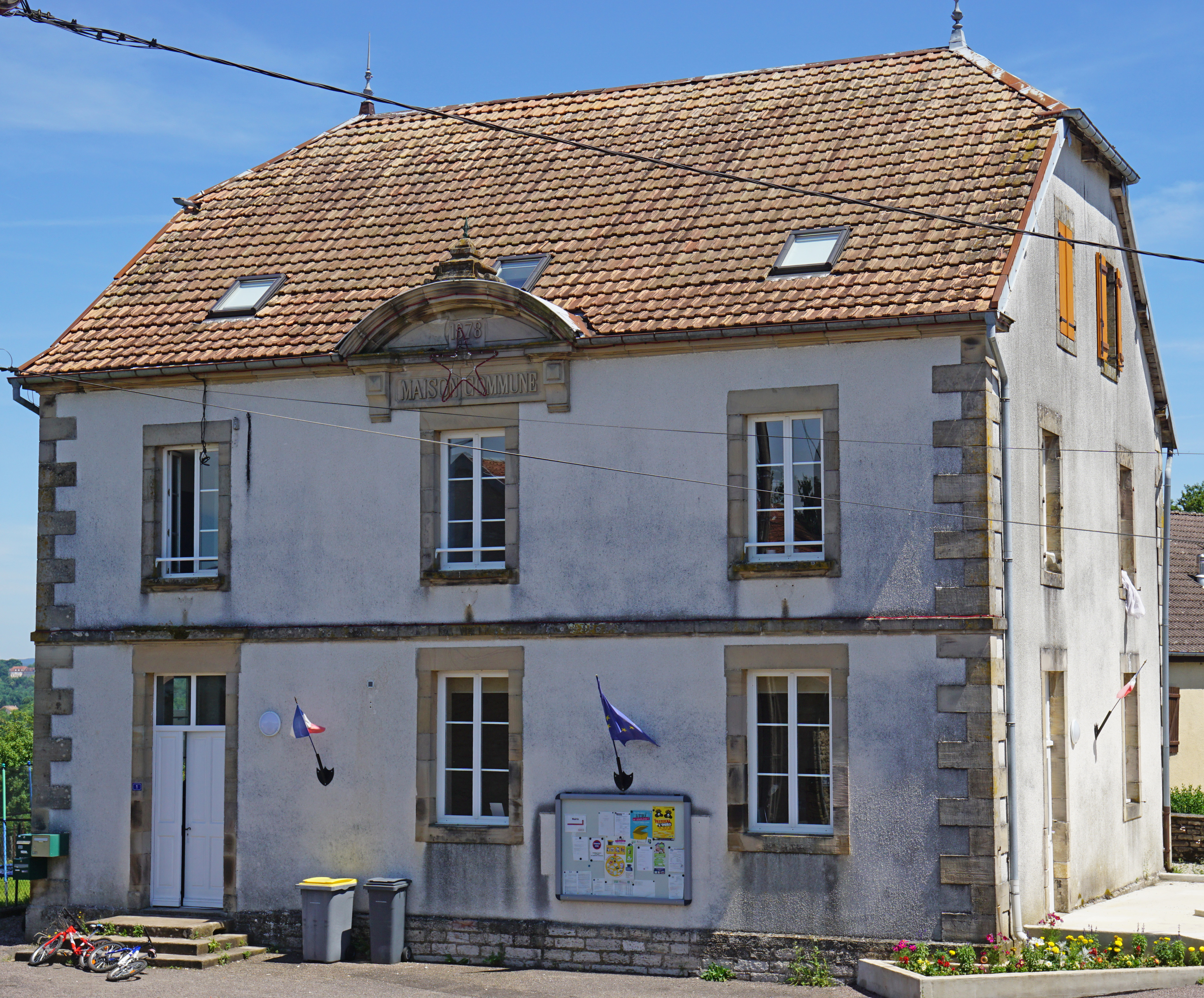
- The town hall in Moimay

- Coat of arms
- Location of Moimay
- Location within France Location within Bourgogne-Franche-Comté
- Coordinates: 47°33′13″N 6°24′34″E
- Country: France
- Region: Bourgogne-Franche-Comté
- Department: Haute-Saône
- Arrondissement: Lure
- Canton: Villersexel

Government
  - Mayor (2020–2026): André Marthey
- Area^{1}: 6.22 km^{2} (2.40 sq mi)
- Highest elevation: 370 m (1,210 ft)
- Lowest elevation: 257 m (843 ft)
- Population (2023): 240
  - Density: 39/km^{2} (100/sq mi)
- Time zone: UTC+01:00 (CET)
  - Summer (DST): UTC+02:00 (CEST)
- INSEE/Postal code: 70349 /70110
- ^{1} French Land Register data, which excludes lakes, ponds, glaciers > 1 km^{2} (0.386 sq mi or 247 acres) and river estuaries.

Moimay (French pronunciation: [mwamɛ]) is a commune in the Haute-Saône department in the region of Bourgogne-Franche-Comté in eastern France.

== See also ==
- Communes of the Haute-Saône department
