= Senargent-Mignafans =

- Commune
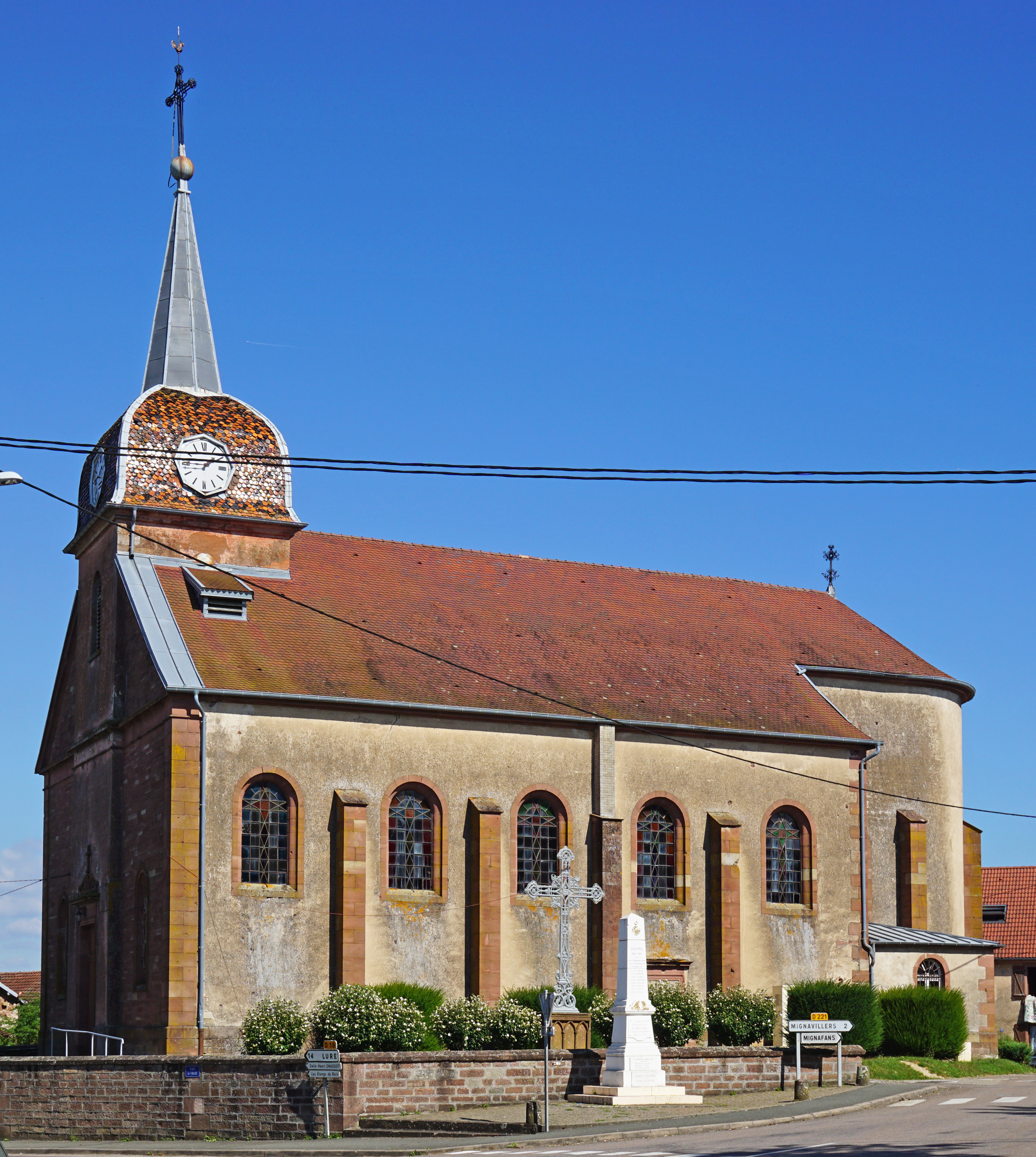
- The church in Senargent

- Coat of arms
- Location of Senargent-Mignafans
- Location within France Location within Bourgogne-Franche-Comté
- Coordinates: 47°33′57″N 6°31′37″E
- Country: France
- Region: Bourgogne-Franche-Comté
- Department: Haute-Saône
- Arrondissement: Lure
- Canton: Villersexel

Government
  - Mayor (2020–2026): Daniel Zanher
- Area^{1}: 10.77 km^{2} (4.16 sq mi)
- Highest elevation: 372 m (1,220 ft)
- Lowest elevation: 269 m (883 ft)
- Population (2023): 287
  - Density: 26.6/km^{2} (69.0/sq mi)
- Time zone: UTC+01:00 (CET)
  - Summer (DST): UTC+02:00 (CEST)
- INSEE/Postal code: 70487 /70110
- ^{1} French Land Register data, which excludes lakes, ponds, glaciers > 1 km^{2} (0.386 sq mi or 247 acres) and river estuaries.

Senargent-Mignafans (French pronunciation: [sənaʁɡɑ̃ miɲafɑ̃]) is a commune in the Haute-Saône department in the region of Bourgogne-Franche-Comté in eastern France. It was created in 1973 by the merger of two former communes: Senargent and Mignafans.

== See also ==
- Communes of the Haute-Saône department
