= Oppenans =

- Commune
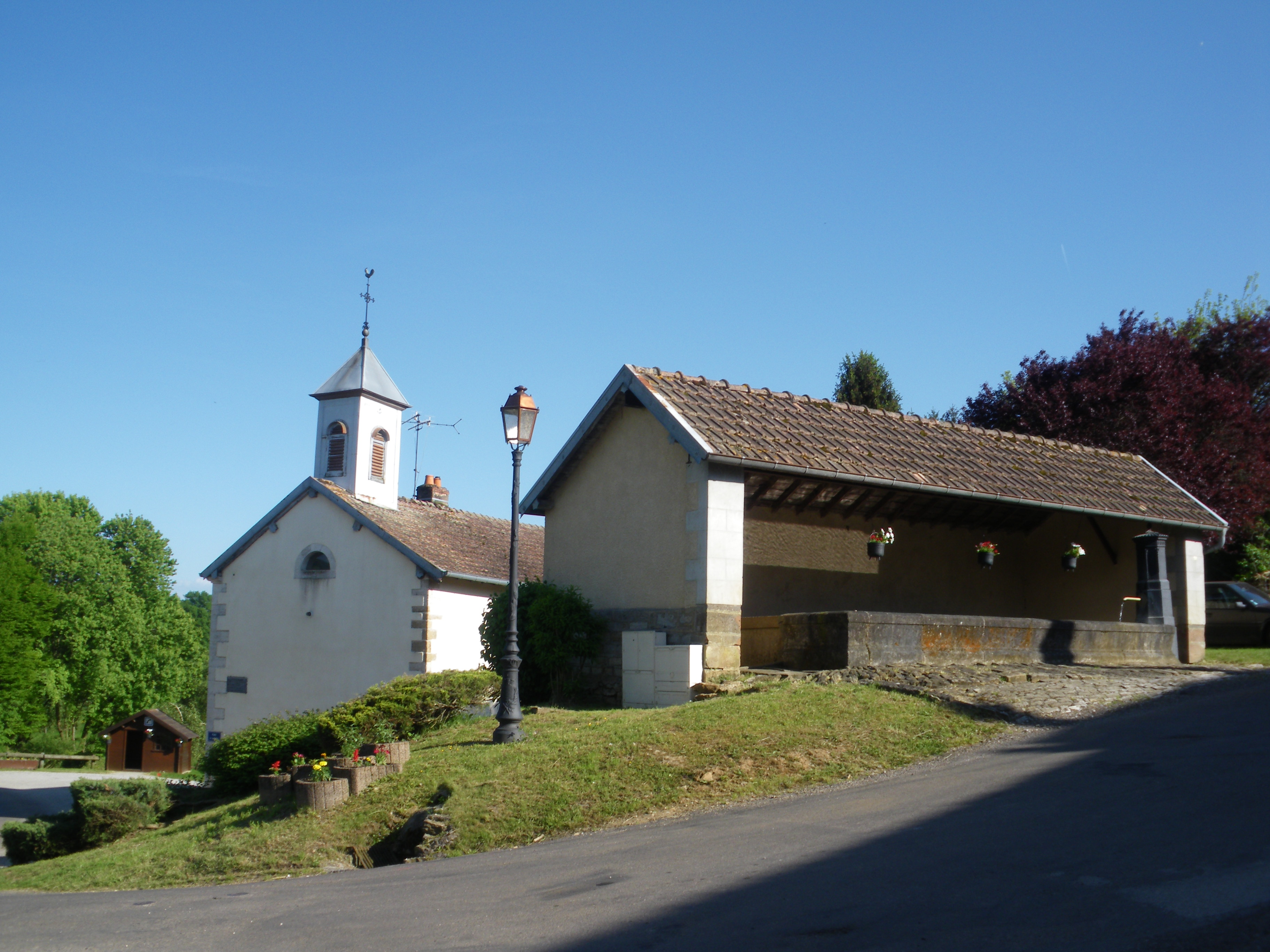
- The wash house and town hall in Oppenans

- Coat of arms
- Location of Oppenans
- Location within France Location within Bourgogne-Franche-Comté
- Coordinates: 47°35′23″N 6°22′51″E
- Country: France
- Region: Bourgogne-Franche-Comté
- Department: Haute-Saône
- Arrondissement: Lure
- Canton: Villersexel
- Area^{1}: 3.57 km^{2} (1.38 sq mi)
- Highest elevation: 400 m (1,300 ft)
- Lowest elevation: 269 m (883 ft)
- Population (2023): 65
  - Density: 18/km^{2} (47/sq mi)
- Time zone: UTC+01:00 (CET)
  - Summer (DST): UTC+02:00 (CEST)
- INSEE/Postal code: 70395 /70110
- ^{1} French Land Register data, which excludes lakes, ponds, glaciers > 1 km^{2} (0.386 sq mi or 247 acres) and river estuaries.

Oppenans is a commune in the Haute-Saône department in the region of Bourgogne-Franche-Comté in eastern France.

== See also ==
- Communes of the Haute-Saône department
