= Saint-Sulpice, Haute-Saône =

Saint-Sulpice
- Commune
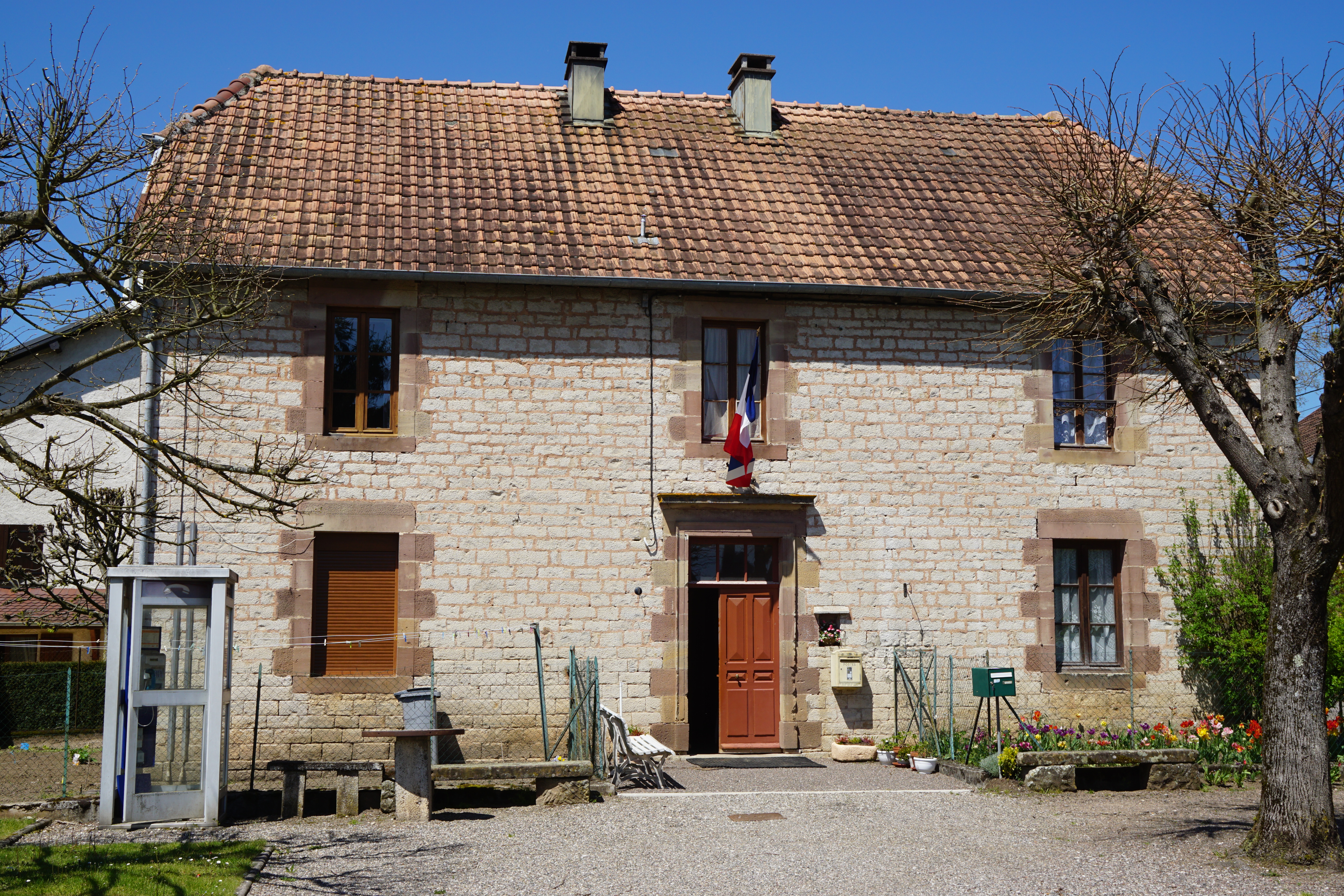
- The town hall in Saint-Sulpice
- Location of Saint-Sulpice
- Location within France Location within Bourgogne-Franche-Comté
- Coordinates: 47°34′01″N 6°26′54″E
- Country: France
- Region: Bourgogne-Franche-Comté
- Department: Haute-Saône
- Arrondissement: Lure
- Canton: Villersexel
- Area^{1}: 3.53 km^{2} (1.36 sq mi)
- Highest elevation: 319 m (1,047 ft)
- Lowest elevation: 260 m (850 ft)
- Population (2023): 119
  - Density: 33.7/km^{2} (87.3/sq mi)
- Time zone: UTC+01:00 (CET)
  - Summer (DST): UTC+02:00 (CEST)
- INSEE/Postal code: 70474 /70110
- ^{1} French Land Register data, which excludes lakes, ponds, glaciers > 1 km^{2} (0.386 sq mi or 247 acres) and river estuaries.

Saint-Sulpice (French pronunciation: [sɛ̃ sylpis]) is a commune in the Haute-Saône department in the region of Bourgogne-Franche-Comté in eastern France.

== Demographics ==
As of 2023, Saint-Sulpice reported a total of 127 inhabitants with a population density of 36.0 people/km^{2} (93 people/mi^{2}). Saint-Sulpice sits close to five major cities; Strasbourg 148 km (closest), Lyon 236 km, Paris 334 km, Nice 436 km & Marseilles 483 km.

== See also ==
- Communes of the Haute-Saône department
