= Autrey-le-Vay =

- Commune
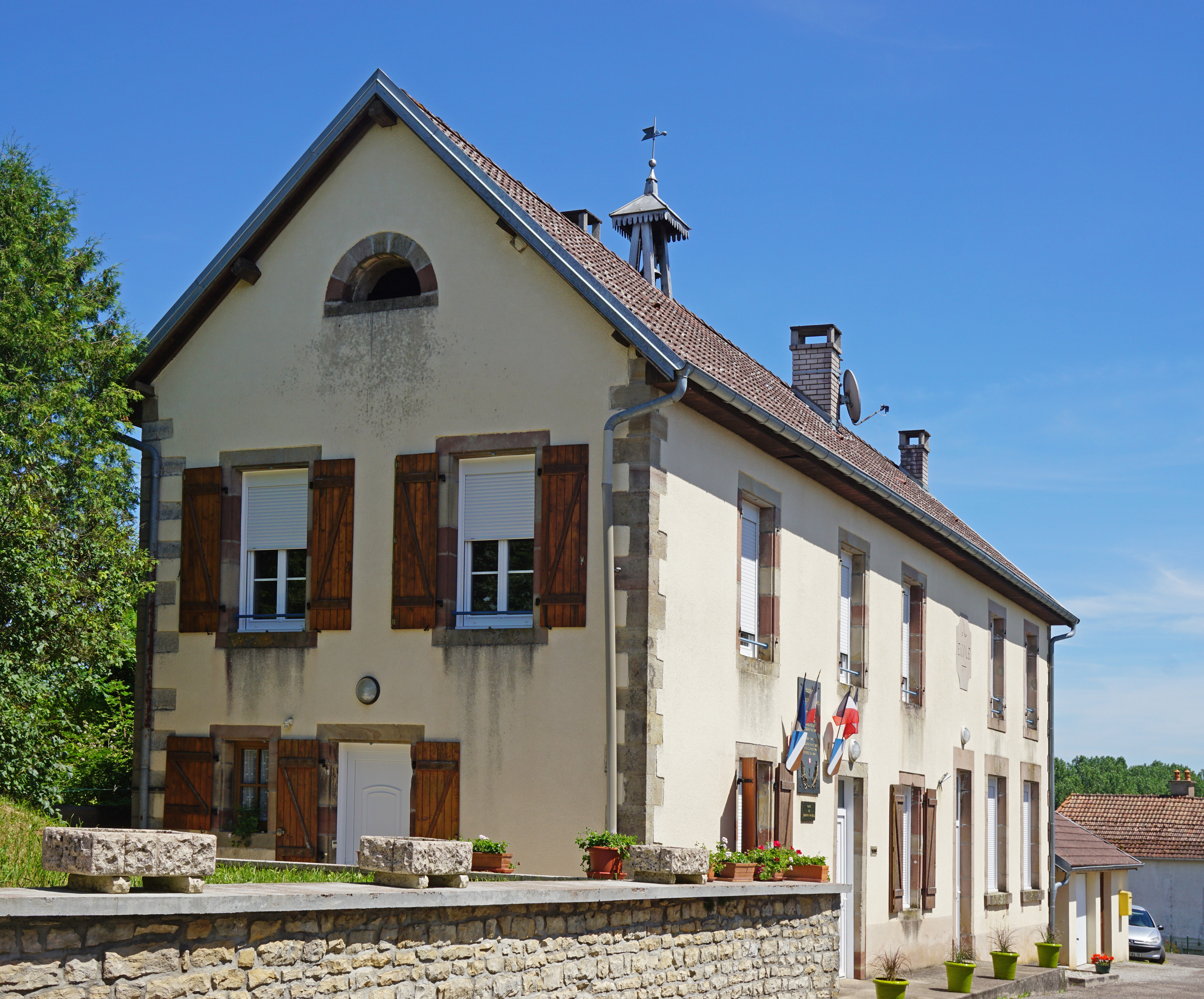
- The town hall in Autrey-le-Vay

- Coat of arms
- Location of Autrey-le-Vay
- Location within France Location within Bourgogne-Franche-Comté
- Coordinates: 47°32′20″N 6°24′06″E
- Country: France
- Region: Bourgogne-Franche-Comté
- Department: Haute-Saône
- Arrondissement: Lure
- Canton: Villersexel
- Intercommunality: CC Pays de Villersexel

Government
  - Mayor (2020–2026): Charles Granet
- Area^{1}: 2.79 km^{2} (1.08 sq mi)
- Highest elevation: 292 m (958 ft)
- Lowest elevation: 255 m (837 ft)
- Population (2023): 93
  - Density: 33/km^{2} (86/sq mi)
- Time zone: UTC+01:00 (CET)
  - Summer (DST): UTC+02:00 (CEST)
- INSEE/Postal code: 70042 /70110
- ^{1} French Land Register data, which excludes lakes, ponds, glaciers > 1 km^{2} (0.386 sq mi or 247 acres) and river estuaries.

Autrey-le-Vay (French pronunciation: [otʁɛ lə vɛ]) is a commune in the Haute-Saône department in the region of Bourgogne-Franche-Comté in eastern France.

== See also ==
- Communes of the Haute-Saône department
