= Colombe-lès-Vesoul =

- Commune
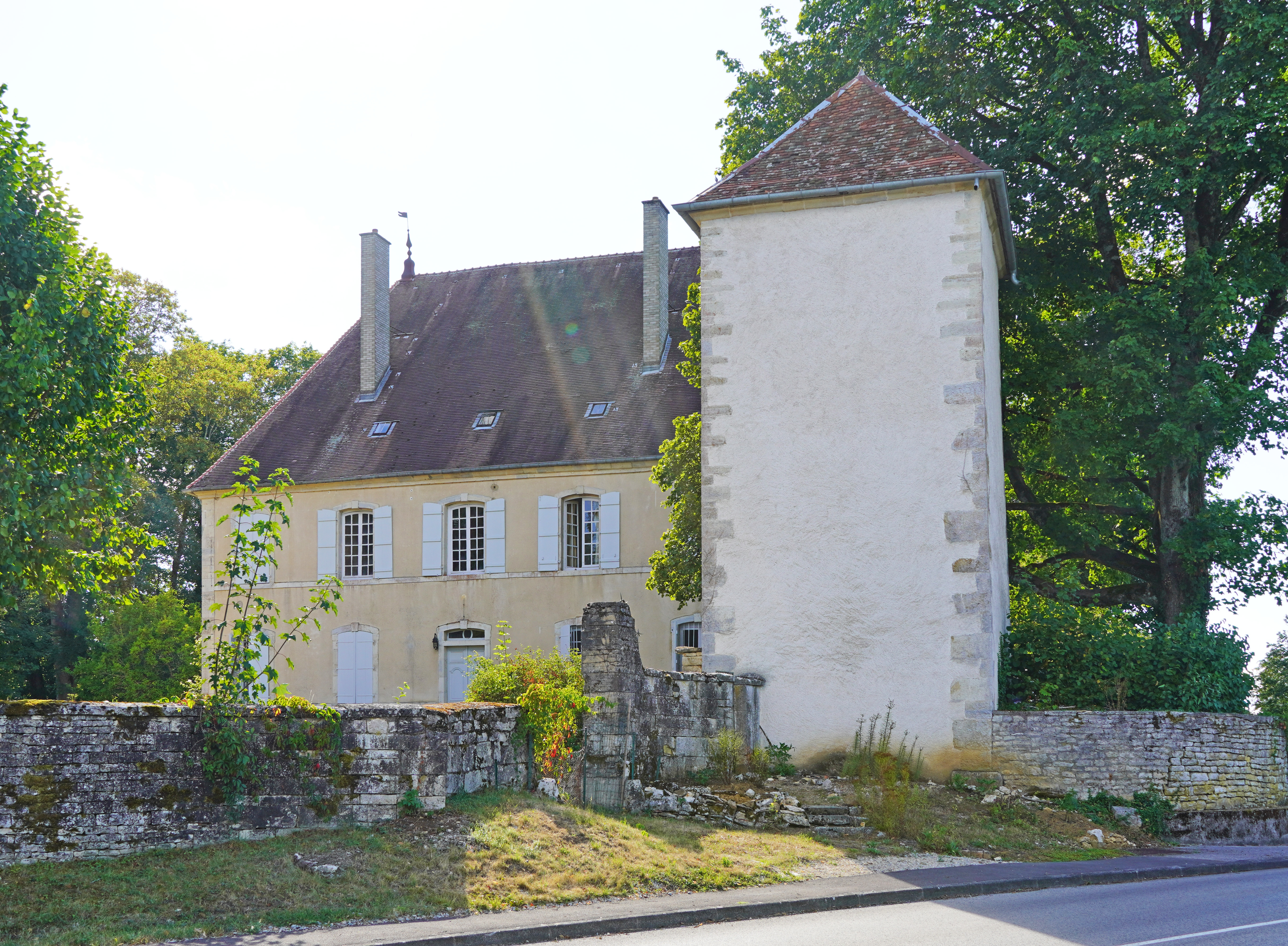
- The chateau in Colombe-lès-Vesoul

- Coat of arms
- Location of Colombe-lès-Vesoul
- Location within France Location within Bourgogne-Franche-Comté
- Coordinates: 47°36′52″N 6°12′47″E
- Country: France
- Region: Bourgogne-Franche-Comté
- Department: Haute-Saône
- Arrondissement: Vesoul
- Canton: Villersexel

Government
  - Mayor (2020–2026): Patrick Goux
- Area^{1}: 7.94 km^{2} (3.07 sq mi)
- Highest elevation: 351 m (1,152 ft)
- Lowest elevation: 223 m (732 ft)
- Population (2023): 492
  - Density: 62.0/km^{2} (160/sq mi)
- Time zone: UTC+01:00 (CET)
  - Summer (DST): UTC+02:00 (CEST)
- INSEE/Postal code: 70162 /70000
- ^{1} French Land Register data, which excludes lakes, ponds, glaciers > 1 km^{2} (0.386 sq mi or 247 acres) and river estuaries.

Colombe-lès-Vesoul (French pronunciation: [kɔlɔ̃b lɛ vəzul], lit. 'Colombe near Vesoul') is a commune in the Haute-Saône department in the region of Bourgogne-Franche-Comté in eastern France.

== See also ==
- Communes of the Haute-Saône department
