= Montjustin-et-Velotte =

- Commune
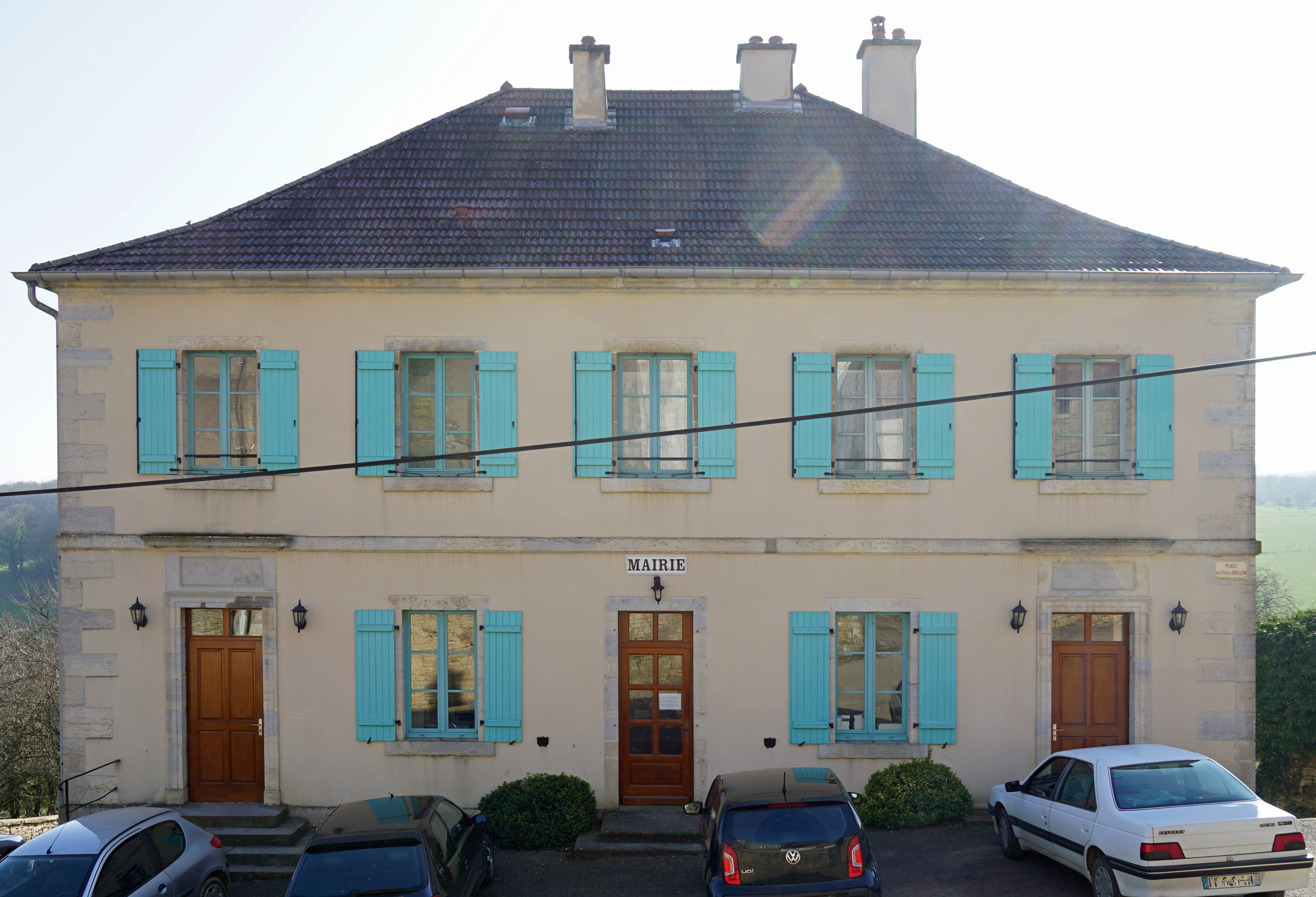
- The town hall in Montjustin-et-Velotte
- Location of Montjustin-et-Velotte
- Location within France Location within Bourgogne-Franche-Comté
- Coordinates: 47°36′54″N 6°22′29″E
- Country: France
- Region: Bourgogne-Franche-Comté
- Department: Haute-Saône
- Arrondissement: Vesoul
- Canton: Villersexel
- Area^{1}: 7.54 km^{2} (2.91 sq mi)
- Highest elevation: 396 m (1,299 ft)
- Lowest elevation: 279 m (915 ft)
- Population (2023): 122
  - Density: 16.2/km^{2} (41.9/sq mi)
- Time zone: UTC+01:00 (CET)
  - Summer (DST): UTC+02:00 (CEST)
- INSEE/Postal code: 70364 /70110
- ^{1} French Land Register data, which excludes lakes, ponds, glaciers > 1 km^{2} (0.386 sq mi or 247 acres) and river estuaries.

Montjustin-et-Velotte (before 1962: Montjustin) is a commune in the Haute-Saône department in the region of Bourgogne-Franche-Comté in eastern France.

== See also ==
- Communes of the Haute-Saône department
