= Borey, Haute-Saône =

Borey
- Commune
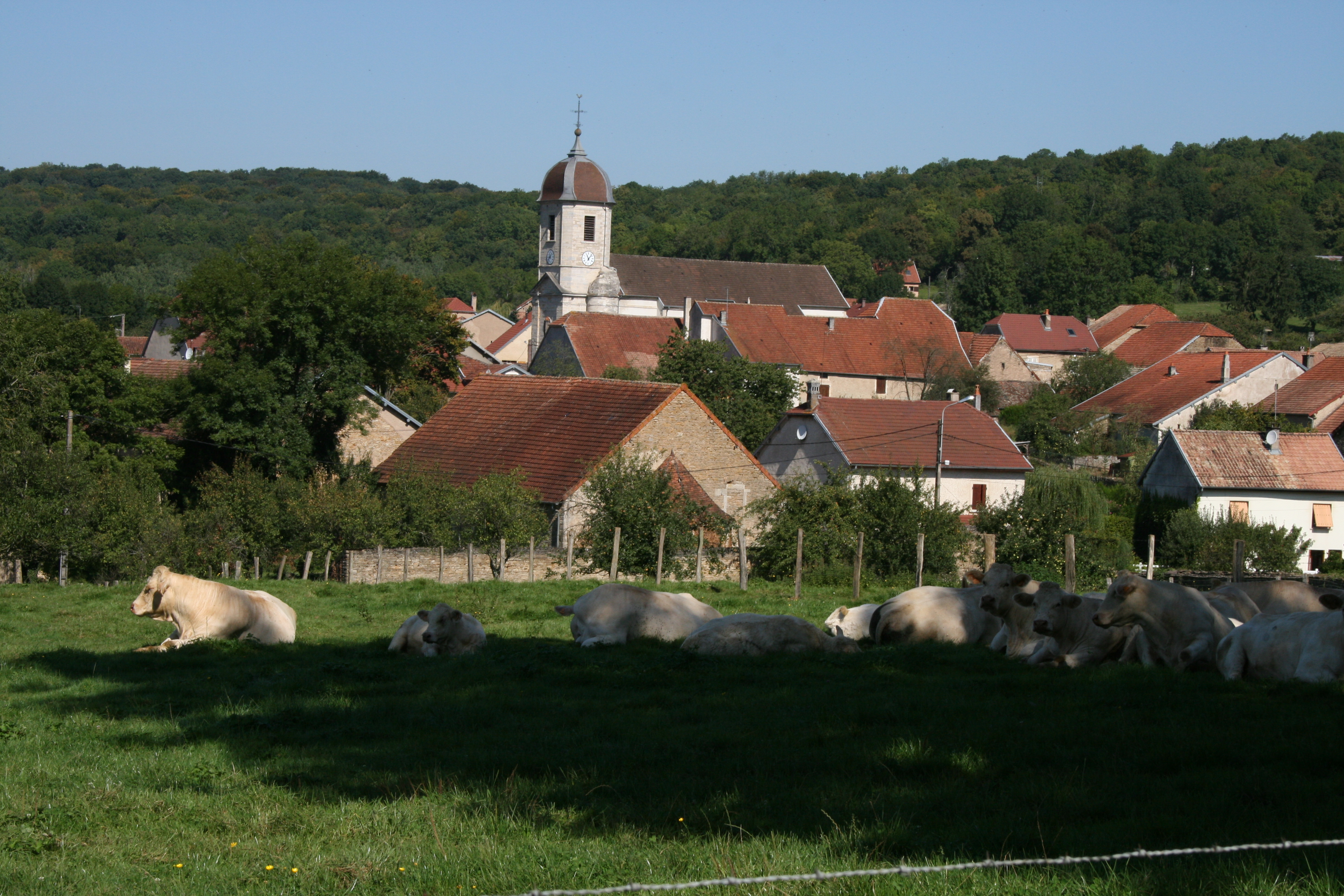
- A general view of Borey
- Location of Borey
- Location within France Location within Bourgogne-Franche-Comté
- Coordinates: 47°35′39″N 6°21′29″E
- Country: France
- Region: Bourgogne-Franche-Comté
- Department: Haute-Saône
- Arrondissement: Vesoul
- Canton: Villersexel

Government
  - Mayor (2020–2026): Luc Gondelberg
- Area^{1}: 14.50 km^{2} (5.60 sq mi)
- Highest elevation: 438 m (1,437 ft)
- Lowest elevation: 282 m (925 ft)
- Population (2023): 223
  - Density: 15.4/km^{2} (39.8/sq mi)
- Time zone: UTC+01:00 (CET)
  - Summer (DST): UTC+02:00 (CEST)
- INSEE/Postal code: 70077 /70110
- ^{1} French Land Register data, which excludes lakes, ponds, glaciers > 1 km^{2} (0.386 sq mi or 247 acres) and river estuaries.

Borey (French pronunciation: [bɔʁɛ]) is a commune in the Haute-Saône department in the region of Bourgogne-Franche-Comté in eastern France. The parish church is dedicated to Saint Martin.

== See also ==
- Communes of the Haute-Saône department
