= La Demie =

- Commune
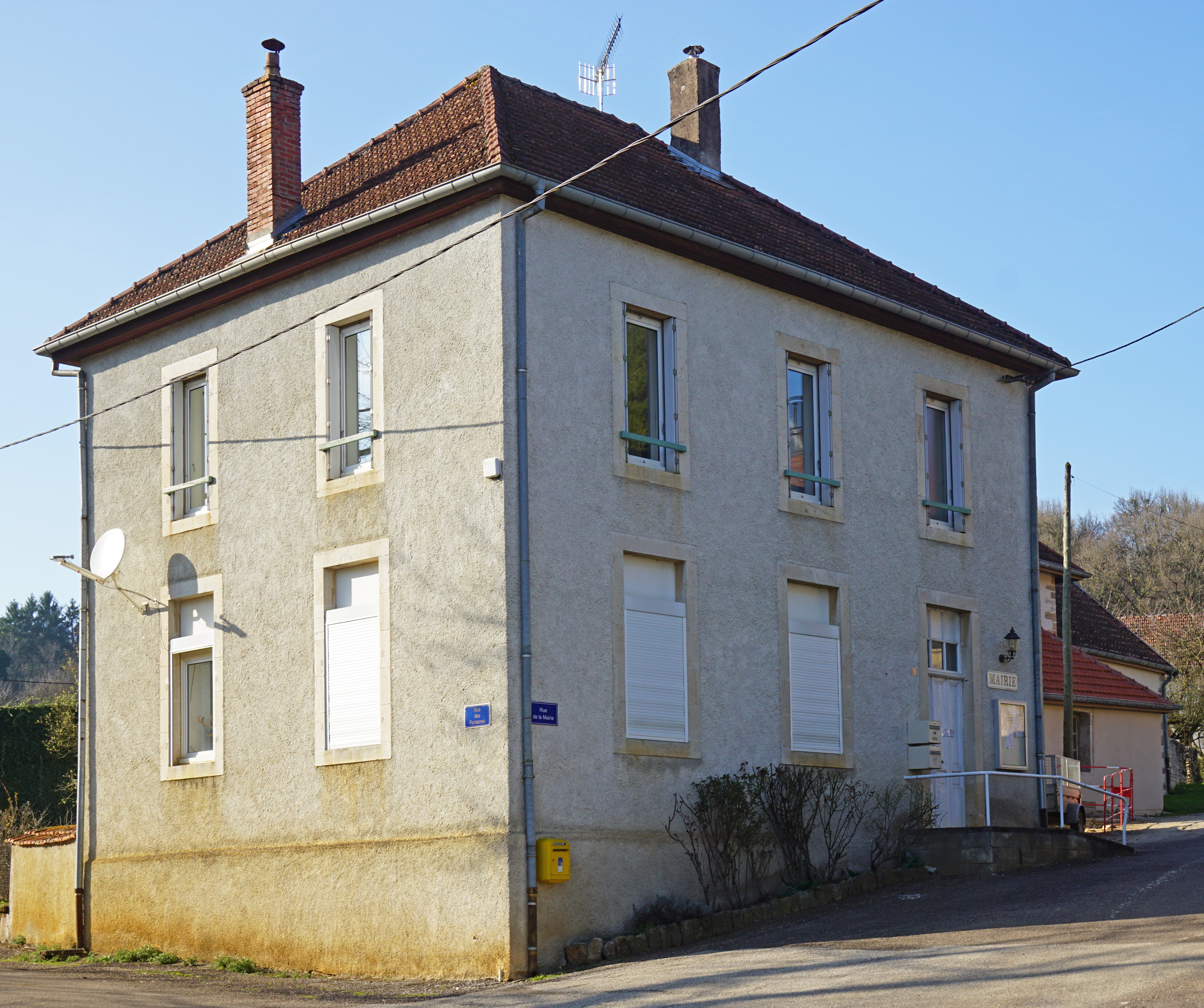
- The town hall in La Demie
- Location of La Demie
- Location within France Location within Bourgogne-Franche-Comté
- Coordinates: 47°35′11″N 6°10′34″E
- Country: France
- Region: Bourgogne-Franche-Comté
- Department: Haute-Saône
- Arrondissement: Vesoul
- Canton: Villersexel

Government
  - Mayor (2020–2026): Pierre-Henri Ferber
- Area^{1}: 6.26 km^{2} (2.42 sq mi)
- Highest elevation: 447 m (1,467 ft)
- Lowest elevation: 260 m (850 ft)
- Population (2023): 161
  - Density: 25.7/km^{2} (66.6/sq mi)
- Time zone: UTC+01:00 (CET)
  - Summer (DST): UTC+02:00 (CEST)
- INSEE/Postal code: 70203 /70000
- ^{1} French Land Register data, which excludes lakes, ponds, glaciers > 1 km^{2} (0.386 sq mi or 247 acres) and river estuaries.

La Demie (French pronunciation: [la dəmi]) is a commune in the Haute-Saône department in the region of Bourgogne-Franche-Comté in eastern France.

== See also ==
- Communes of the Haute-Saône department
