= Autrey Nell Wiley =

American literary critic and professor (1901–1990)

Autrey Nell Wiley (27 May 1901 – 28 May 1990) was an American literary critic and professor. She graduated from Texas Women's University in 1922 and began teaching English the same year. She subsequently served as Dean of the School of Arts and Sciences. She retired in 1971 as chair of the English department, a role in which she'd served for more than twenty years. Wiley earned the TWU Distinguished Alumnae Award in 1969.

== Publications ==
- Bibliography: The Preparation and Certification of Teachers of English
- Female Prologues and Epilogues in English Plays
- Reiterative Devices in "Leaves of Grass"
- The English Vogue of Prologues and Epilogues
- The Miller's Head Again
- The Preparation and Certification of Teachers of English: 1958 Supplement to a Bibliography (1950-1956)
