= Cerre-lès-Noroy =

- Commune
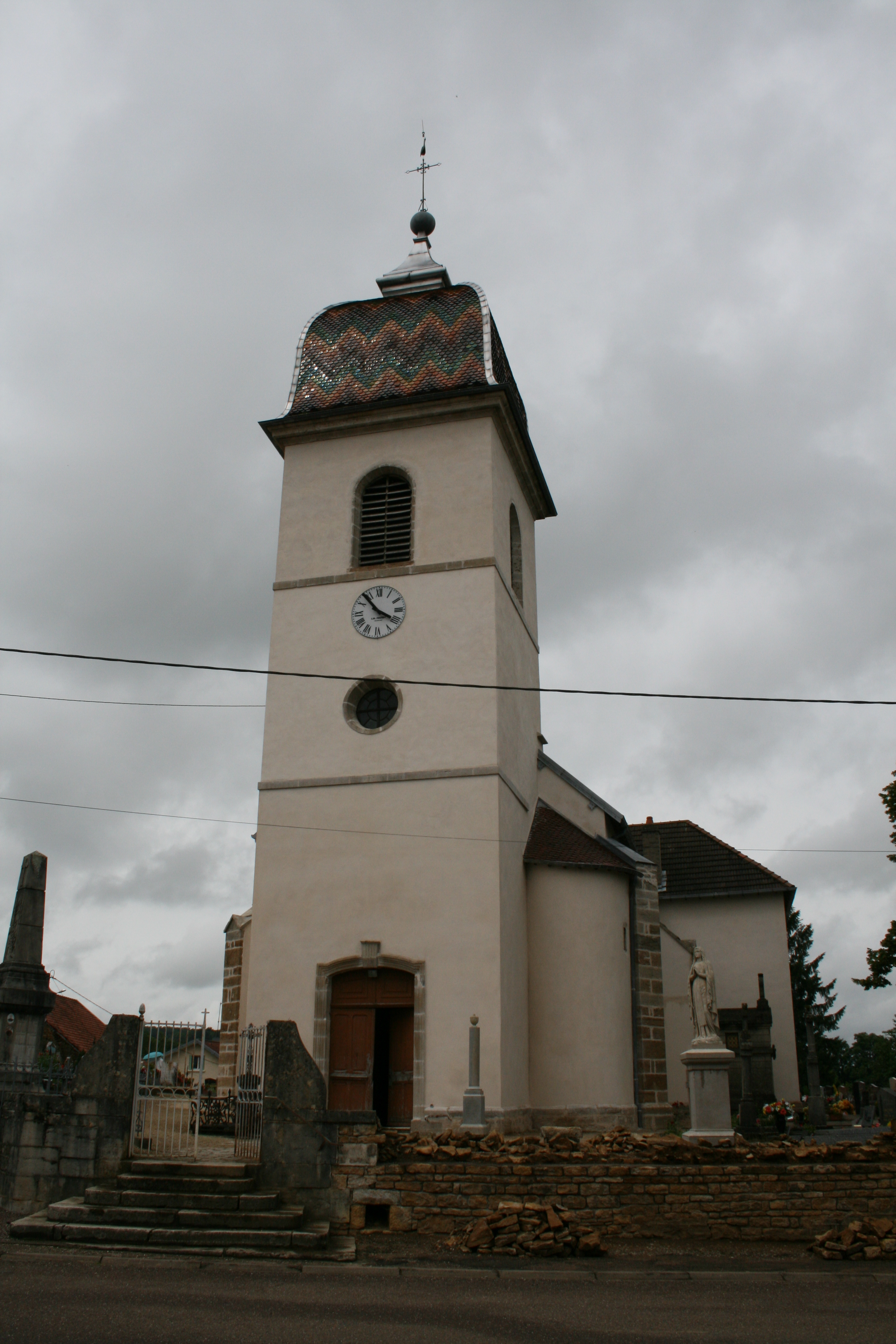
- The church in Cerre-lès-Noroy
- Location of Cerre-lès-Noroy
- Location within France Location within Bourgogne-Franche-Comté
- Coordinates: 47°36′05″N 6°19′01″E
- Country: France
- Region: Bourgogne-Franche-Comté
- Department: Haute-Saône
- Arrondissement: Vesoul
- Canton: Villersexel

Government
  - Mayor (2020–2026): Gilbert Henry
- Area^{1}: 9.96 km^{2} (3.85 sq mi)
- Highest elevation: 438 m (1,437 ft)
- Lowest elevation: 285 m (935 ft)
- Population (2023): 238
  - Density: 23.9/km^{2} (61.9/sq mi)
- Time zone: UTC+01:00 (CET)
  - Summer (DST): UTC+02:00 (CEST)
- INSEE/Postal code: 70115 /70000
- ^{1} French Land Register data, which excludes lakes, ponds, glaciers > 1 km^{2} (0.386 sq mi or 247 acres) and river estuaries.

Cerre-lès-Noroy (French pronunciation: [sɛʁ lɛ nɔʁwa], literally Cerre near Noroy) is a commune in the Haute-Saône department in the region of Bourgogne-Franche-Comté in eastern France.

== See also ==
- Communes of the Haute-Saône department
