= Autry (name) =

Autry is both a given name and surname. Notable people with the name include:

- Autry Beamon (born 1953), American football player
- Autry Inman (1929–1988), American musician
- Alan Autry (born 1952), American actor
- Chick Autry (first baseman) (1885–1976), American baseball player
- Chick Autry (catcher) (1903–1950), American baseball player
- Darnell Autry (born 1976), American football player
- Denico Autry (born 1990), American football player
- Gene Autry (1907–1998), American singer, actor, businessman, owner of the Los Angeles Angels baseball team
- Jackie Autry (born 1941), American executive
- Micajah Autry (1793–1836), Alamo defender
