= Briaucourt, Haute-Saône =

Briaucourt
- Commune
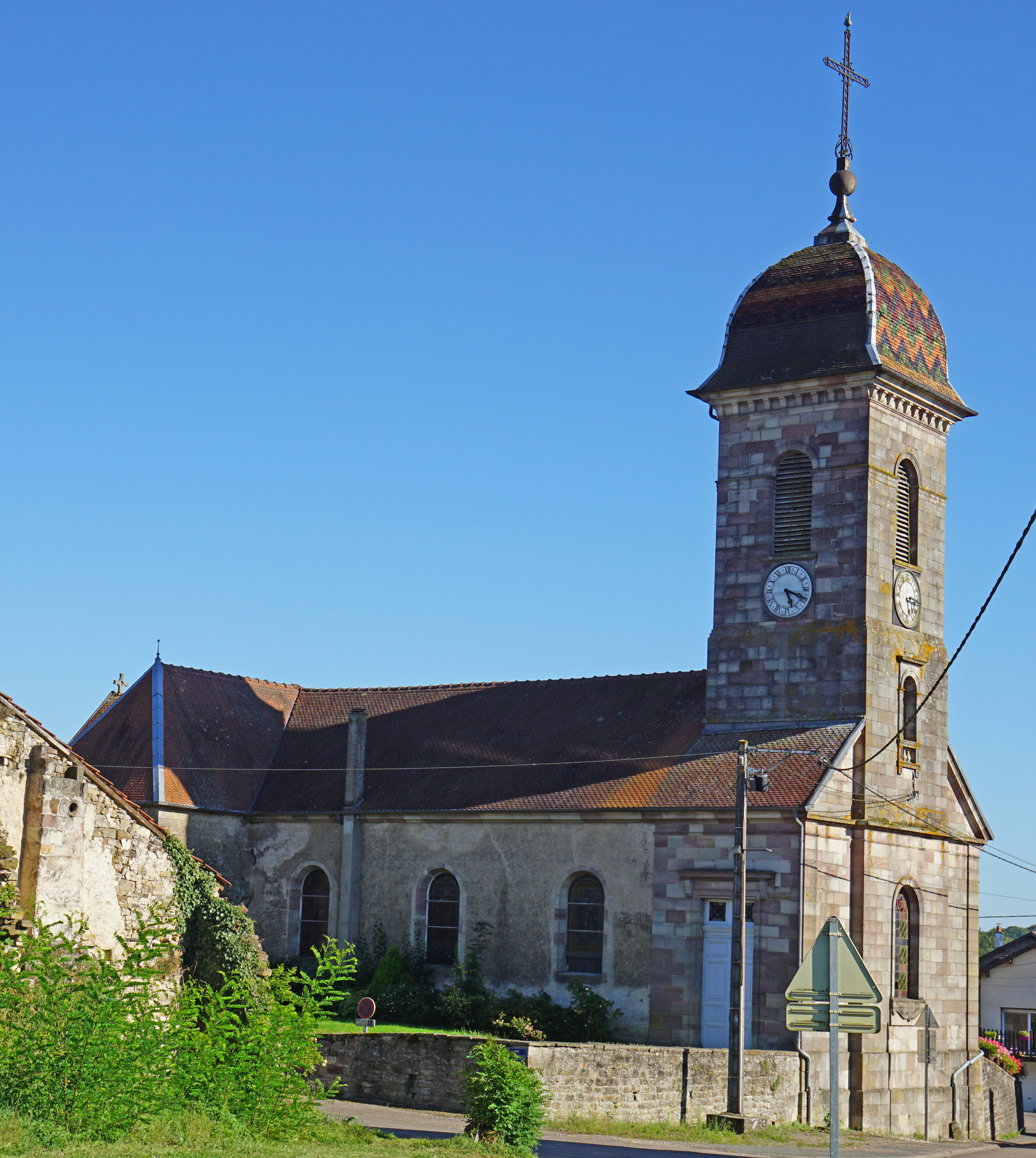
- The church in Briaucourt

- Coat of arms
- Location of Briaucourt
- Location within France Location within Bourgogne-Franche-Comté
- Coordinates: 47°49′28″N 6°15′01″E
- Country: France
- Region: Bourgogne-Franche-Comté
- Department: Haute-Saône
- Arrondissement: Lure
- Canton: Saint-Loup-sur-Semouse

Government
  - Mayor (2020–2026): Nicolas Choux
- Area^{1}: 9.83 km^{2} (3.80 sq mi)
- Highest elevation: 294 m (965 ft)
- Lowest elevation: 227 m (745 ft)
- Population (2023): 256
  - Density: 26.0/km^{2} (67.5/sq mi)
- Time zone: UTC+01:00 (CET)
  - Summer (DST): UTC+02:00 (CEST)
- INSEE/Postal code: 70097 /70800
- ^{1} French Land Register data, which excludes lakes, ponds, glaciers > 1 km^{2} (0.386 sq mi or 247 acres) and river estuaries.

Briaucourt (French pronunciation: [bʁijokuʁ]) is a commune in the Haute-Saône department in the region of Bourgogne-Franche-Comté in eastern France.

== Geography ==
The Lanterne River flows through the commune. To the South it borders the communes of Velorcey, Abelcourt, Sainte-Marie-en-Chaux, from southeast to southwest, respectively. To the west it borders the communes of Ormoiche and Francalmont. To the east, Conflans-sur-Lanterne. To the north it borders Ainville, and to the northeast, Plainemont. Out of these, two of them are in different cantons, Plainemont, which is in the Canton Port-sur-Saône, and the Commune of Ormoiche, which is in the Canton of Luxeuil-les-Bains.

== Notable people ==
- Henri Genaille (October 2, 1856-?) inventor of Genaille-Lucas rulers

=== Mayors of Briaucourt ===
- Raymond Py (2001-2003, Independent)
- Denis Laurent (2003–Present, The Republicans)

== See also ==
- Communes of the Haute-Saône department
