= Lanterne (river) =

Coordinates: 47.7967°N 6.53667°E

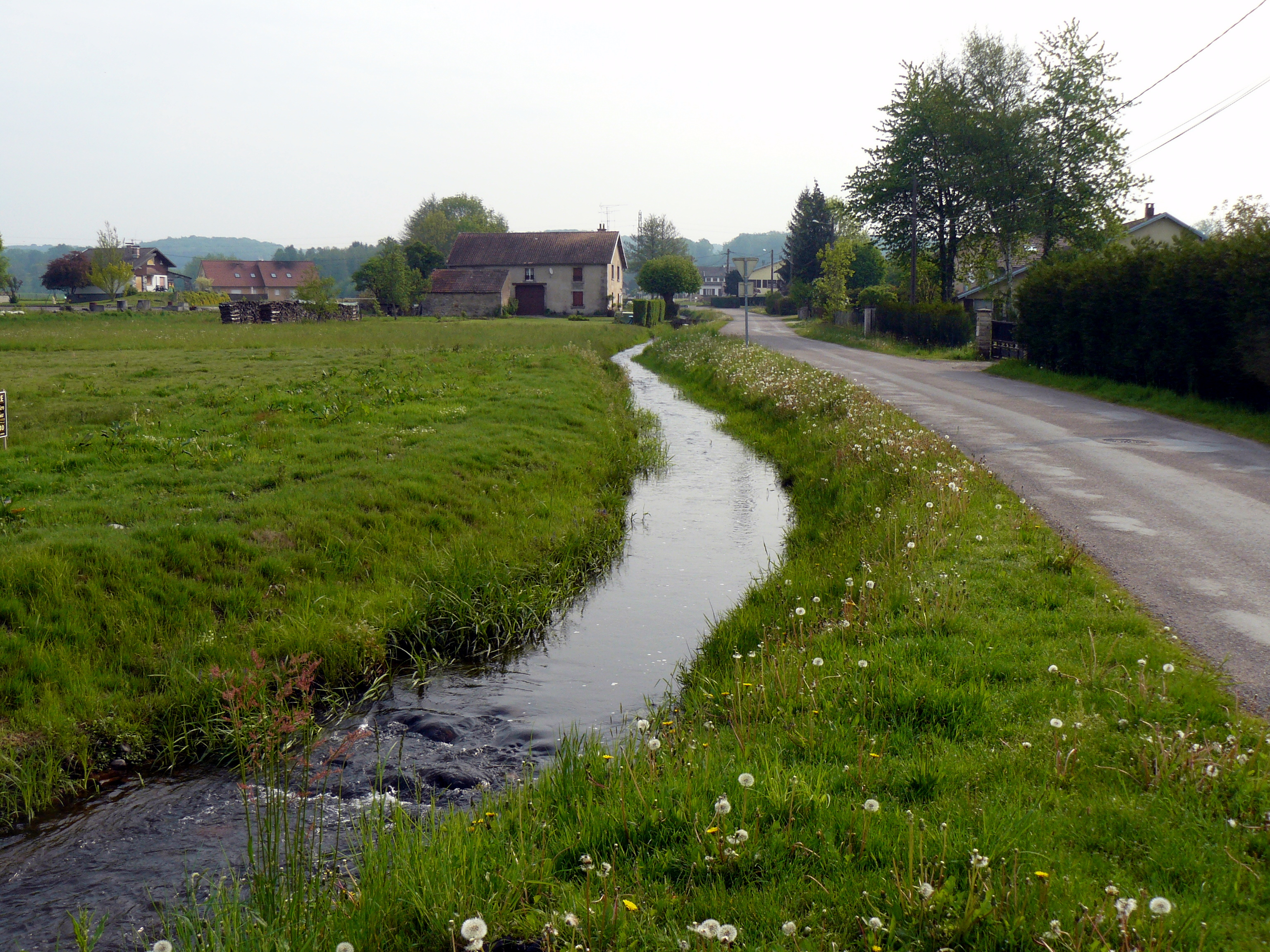
- The Lanterne at Lantenot

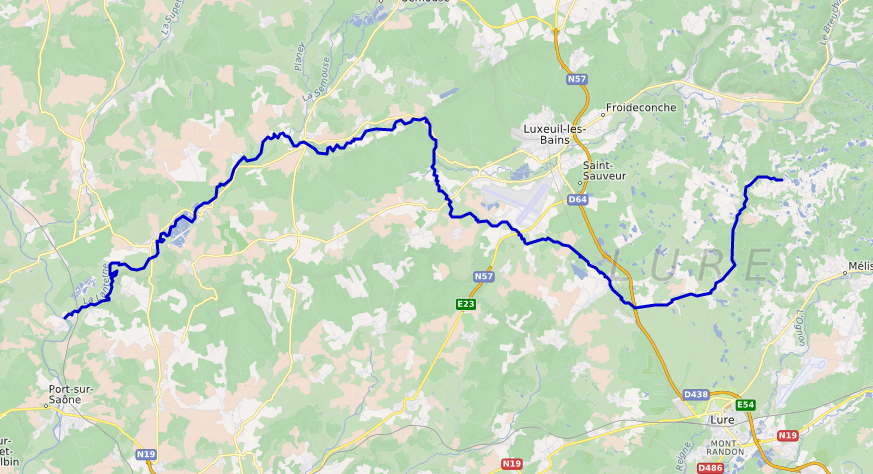
- Native name: La Lanterne (French)

Location
- Country: France

Physical characteristics
- Source
  - location: Parc naturel régional des Ballons des Vosges
  - elevation: 430 m (1,410 ft)
- Mouth
  - location: Saône
  - elevation: 216 m (709 ft)
- Length: 64.3 km (40.0 mi)
- Basin size: 1,020 km^{2} (390 sq mi)
- Discharge
  - average: 22.1 m^{3}/s (780 cu ft/s)

Basin features
- Progression: Saône→ Rhône→ Mediterranean Sea

The Lanterne (French pronunciation: [lɑ̃tɛʁn]) is a river in the east of France, a substantial left tributary of the Saône, and sub-tributary of the Rhône. It is 64.3 km (40.0 mi) long.

== Geography ==
The Lanterne rises within the parc naturel régional des Ballons des Vosges, in the commune of La Lanterne-et-les-Armonts in the département of Haute-Saône. It flows westward, then northwestward, then northward, and finally southwestward. It receives fast-flowing tributaries from the Massif des Vosges in the north. It flows to the south of Luxeuil-les-Bains and Saint-Loup-sur-Semouse.

The watershed of the Lanterne is scattered with over 1,000 bodies of water, notably in the "Plateau des Mille Étangs" (plateau of a thousand ponds) in the Vosges Massif.

The Lanterne joins the Saône at Conflandey, just downstream of the hydrological station at Fleurey-lès-Faverney. The confluence occurs a few kilometres upstream of the antique town of Port-sur-Saône.

The Lanterne's course includes numerous diversions, once used for irrigation, drinking water and water mills.

Initially the Lanterne was crossed at Faverney via a ford, then by a ferry boat. Following a capsizing on 30 May 1746, which resulted in drownings, a bridge was built.

Cherlieu Abbey owns fisheries at Conflans.

=== Route ===
The Lanterne flows through the following towns and villages:

- La Lanterne-et-les-Armonts
- Belmont
- Lantenot
- Linexert
- Franchevelle
- Quers
- Citers
- Ailloncourt
- La Chapelle-lès-Luxeuil
- Baudoncourt
- Éhuns
- Sainte-Marie-en-Chaux
- Ormoiche
- Briaucourt
- Conflans-sur-Lanterne
- Bassigney
- Bourguignon-lès-Conflans
- Mersuay
- Faverney
- Fleurey-lès-Faverney
- Amoncourt
- Conflandey

=== Tributaries ===
The Lanterne is fed by the following tributaries and sub-tributaries:

- Lambier (5.5 km)
- Vay de Brest (8.5 km)
- Bas (3 km)
- Breuchin (44.2 km) with sub-tributaries
  - Tampa (2.4 km)
  - Croslière (6 km)
  - Raddon (9.8 km)
  - Beuletin (15 km)
  - Morbief (6.7 km)
- Rôge, (21 km)
- Semouse, (41 km), with sub-tributaries
  - Augronne, (25 km)
  - Combeauté, (38 km)
  - Hallot (3.3 km)
  - Chânet (6 km)
  - Caleuches (8 km)
- Planey (7 km), with sub-tributaries
  - Dorgeon (9 km)
  - Chânois (5 km)
  - Auvets (3.8 km)
- Meurcourt (7 km)
- Courcelles (4.3 km)

== Hydrology ==
The annual mean flow rate of the Lanterne, calculated over 45 years of measurements at Fleurey-lès-Faverney as of 2008 (1964–2008), is 22.1 m³/s for a watershed of 1,020 km². The river exhibits seasonal fluctuations in flow rate, with winter floods from 32.4 to 37.3 m³/s from December to March inclusive, and weak flow in summer, in July/August/September, characterised by a decrease in the average monthly flow rate to 6.86 m³ in August.

Average monthly flow rate (m³/s) measured at the Fleurey-lès-Faverney hydrological station – data calculated from 45 years of measurements

At low water, the 3-year low instantaneous flow rate can drop to 1.7 m³/s in the case of a dry five-year period.

Floods can be very significant. The maximum instantaneous flow rates over a 2-year and 5-year period (MIFR2 and MIFR5) measure 130 and 180 m³/s respectively. The MIFR10 is 220 m³/s, and the MIFR50 is 290 m³/s.

For purposes of comparison, the MIFR10 measured at Cailly-sur-Eure for the river Eure, a western French river of comparable flow rate in the Seine basin, is only 90 m³/s, while its MIFR50 is 120 m³/s. Thus the Lanterne, whose watershed is less than a quarter the extent of the Eure, exhibits floods more than twice as large.

The maximum instantaneous flow rate recorded for the Lanterne was 286 m³/s on 30 December 2001, while the maximum recorded daily average flow rate was 240 m³/s on 26 May 1983. By relating them to MIFR values of the river, the December 2001 values represent a 50-year event and thus a fairly exceptional flooding.

The Lanterne is a powerful and substantial river. The runoff curve number in its watershed is 687 mm annually, which is high, and results from heavy rainfall in the part of its basin within the Vosges massif. Its specific flow rate reaches a solid 21.7 litres per second per square kilometre of basin. On receiving the Lanterne, the flow rate of the Saône increases by a full two-thirds.

== See also ==
- List of rivers in France
