= Conflans =

Conflans may refer to:

== Communes ==
Conflans is the name or part of the name of ten communes of France:

- Conflans-en-Jarnisy in the Meurthe-et-Moselle département
- Conflans-Sainte-Honorine in the Yvelines département, in the north-western suburbs of Paris
- Conflans-sur-Anille in the Sarthe département
- Conflans-sur-Lanterne in the Haute-Saône département
- Conflans-sur-Loing in the Loiret département
- Conflans-sur-Seine in the Marne département
- Abbéville-lès-Conflans in the Meurthe-et-Moselle département
- Bourguignon-lès-Conflans in the Haute-Saône département
- Dampierre-lès-Conflans in the Haute-Saône département
- Doncourt-lès-Conflans in the Meurthe-et-Moselle département

== Other places ==
- Conflans, a medieval town that is part of the commune of Albertville in Savoie
- Conflans, a district of Charenton-le-Pont, a commune in the southeastern suburbs of Paris; after which the Treaty of Conflans is named

== People ==
- Hubert de Brienne, Comte de Conflans, French military officer active in India during the eighteenth century

== In history ==
- Treaty of Conflans, signed in 1465 between King Louis XI of France and Count Charles of Charolais
