= Fleurey-lès-Saint-Loup =

- Commune
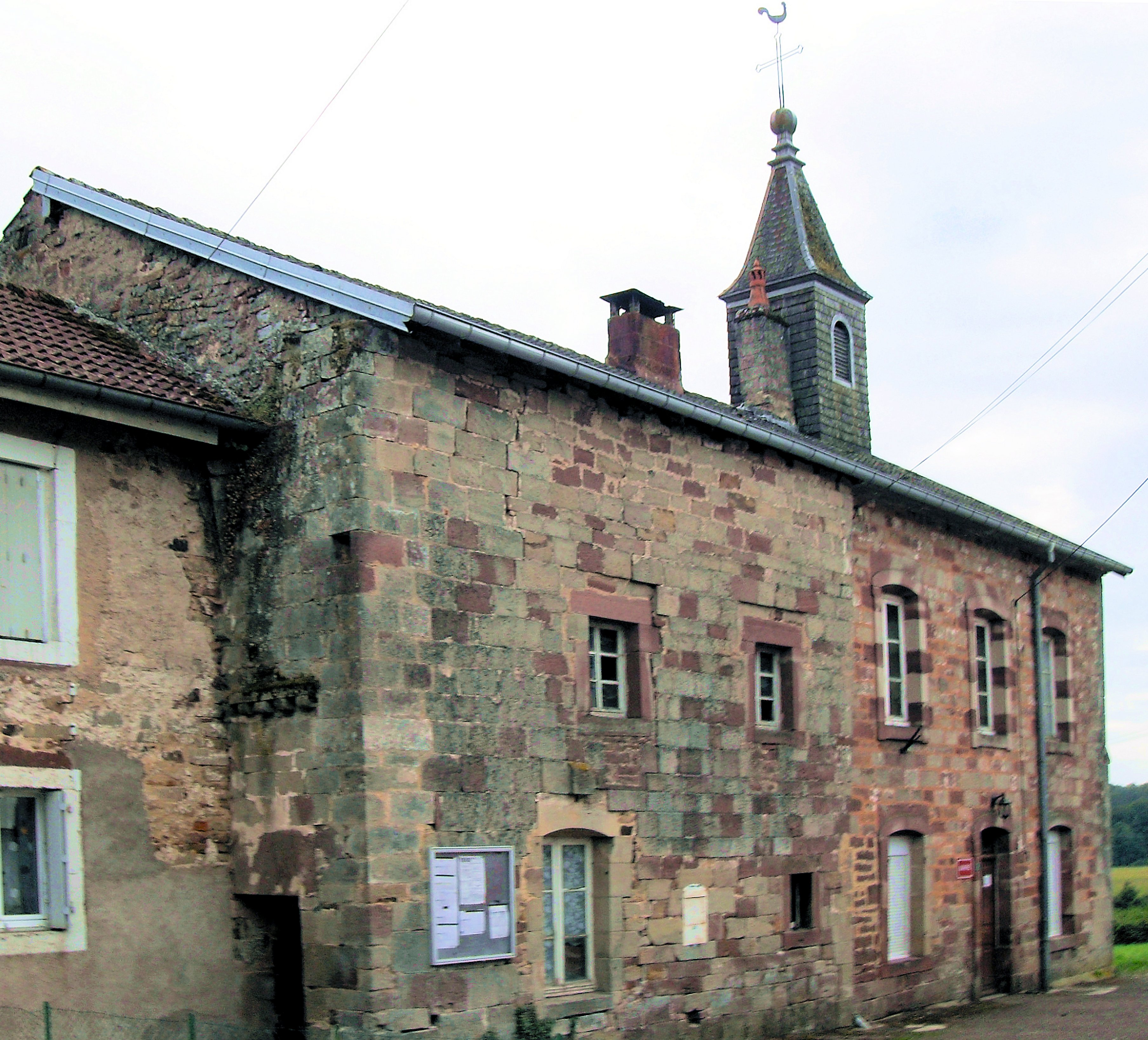
- The town hall in Fleurey-lès-Saint-Loup
- Location of Fleurey-lès-Saint-Loup
- Location within France Location within Bourgogne-Franche-Comté
- Coordinates: 47°55′07″N 6°17′38″E
- Country: France
- Region: Bourgogne-Franche-Comté
- Department: Haute-Saône
- Arrondissement: Lure
- Canton: Saint-Loup-sur-Semouse

Government
  - Mayor (2020–2026): Anne Léonard
- Area^{1}: 3.54 km^{2} (1.37 sq mi)
- Highest elevation: 331 m (1,086 ft)
- Lowest elevation: 251 m (823 ft)
- Population (2023): 127
  - Density: 35.9/km^{2} (92.9/sq mi)
- Time zone: UTC+01:00 (CET)
  - Summer (DST): UTC+02:00 (CEST)
- INSEE/Postal code: 70238 /70800
- ^{1} French Land Register data, which excludes lakes, ponds, glaciers > 1 km^{2} (0.386 sq mi or 247 acres) and river estuaries.

Fleurey-lès-Saint-Loup (French pronunciation: [flœʁɛ lɛ sɛ̃ lu], literally Fleurey near Saint-Loup) is a commune in the Haute-Saône department in the region of Bourgogne-Franche-Comté in eastern France.

== See also ==
- Communes of the Haute-Saône department
