= Ainvelle =

Ainvelle may refer to:

- Ainvelle, Haute-Saône, a commune of France
- Ainvelle, Vosges, a commune of France
