= Canton of Saint-Loup-sur-Semouse =

Coordinates: 47.88°N 6.28°E

The canton of Saint-Loup-sur-Semouse is an administrative division of the Haute-Saône department, northeastern France. Its borders were modified at the French canton reorganisation which came into effect in March 2015. Its seat is in Saint-Loup-sur-Semouse.

It consists of the following communes:

1. Abelcourt
2. Aillevillers-et-Lyaumont
3. Ainvelle
4. Briaucourt
5. Conflans-sur-Lanterne
6. Corbenay
7. Éhuns
8. Fleurey-lès-Saint-Loup
9. Fontaine-lès-Luxeuil
10. Fougerolles-Saint-Valbert (partly)
11. Francalmont
12. Hautevelle
13. Magnoncourt
14. Mailleroncourt-Charette
15. Meurcourt
16. Neurey-en-Vaux
17. Sainte-Marie-en-Chaux
18. Saint-Loup-sur-Semouse
19. La Vaivre
20. Velorcey
21. La Villedieu-en-Fontenette
22. Villers-lès-Luxeuil
23. Visoncourt
