= Neurey-en-Vaux =

- Commune
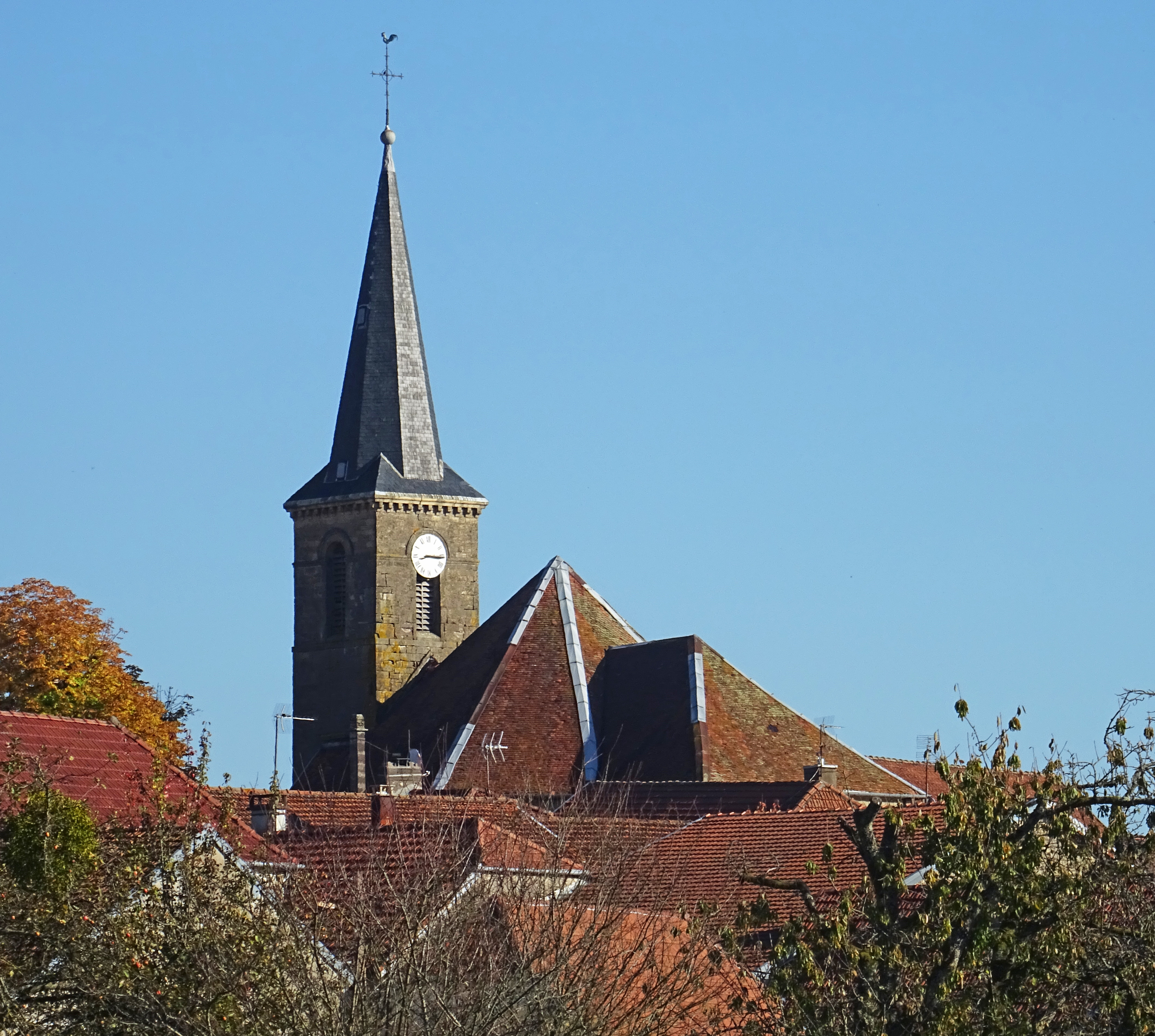
- The church in Neurey-en-Vaux
- Location of Neurey-en-Vaux
- Location within France Location within Bourgogne-Franche-Comté
- Coordinates: 47°44′50″N 6°12′19″E
- Country: France
- Region: Bourgogne-Franche-Comté
- Department: Haute-Saône
- Arrondissement: Lure
- Canton: Saint-Loup-sur-Semouse

Government
  - Mayor (2020–2026): Alain Saget
- Area^{1}: 5.27 km^{2} (2.03 sq mi)
- Highest elevation: 421 m (1,381 ft)
- Lowest elevation: 256 m (840 ft)
- Population (2023): 138
  - Density: 26.2/km^{2} (67.8/sq mi)
- Time zone: UTC+01:00 (CET)
  - Summer (DST): UTC+02:00 (CEST)
- INSEE/Postal code: 70380 /70160
- ^{1} French Land Register data, which excludes lakes, ponds, glaciers > 1 km^{2} (0.386 sq mi or 247 acres) and river estuaries.

Neurey-en-Vaux (French pronunciation: [nœʁɛ ɑ̃ vo]) is a commune in the Haute-Saône department in the region of Bourgogne-Franche-Comté in eastern France. It has 152 inhabitants (1999).

== See also ==
- Communes of the Haute-Saône department
