= La Villedieu-en-Fontenette =

- Commune
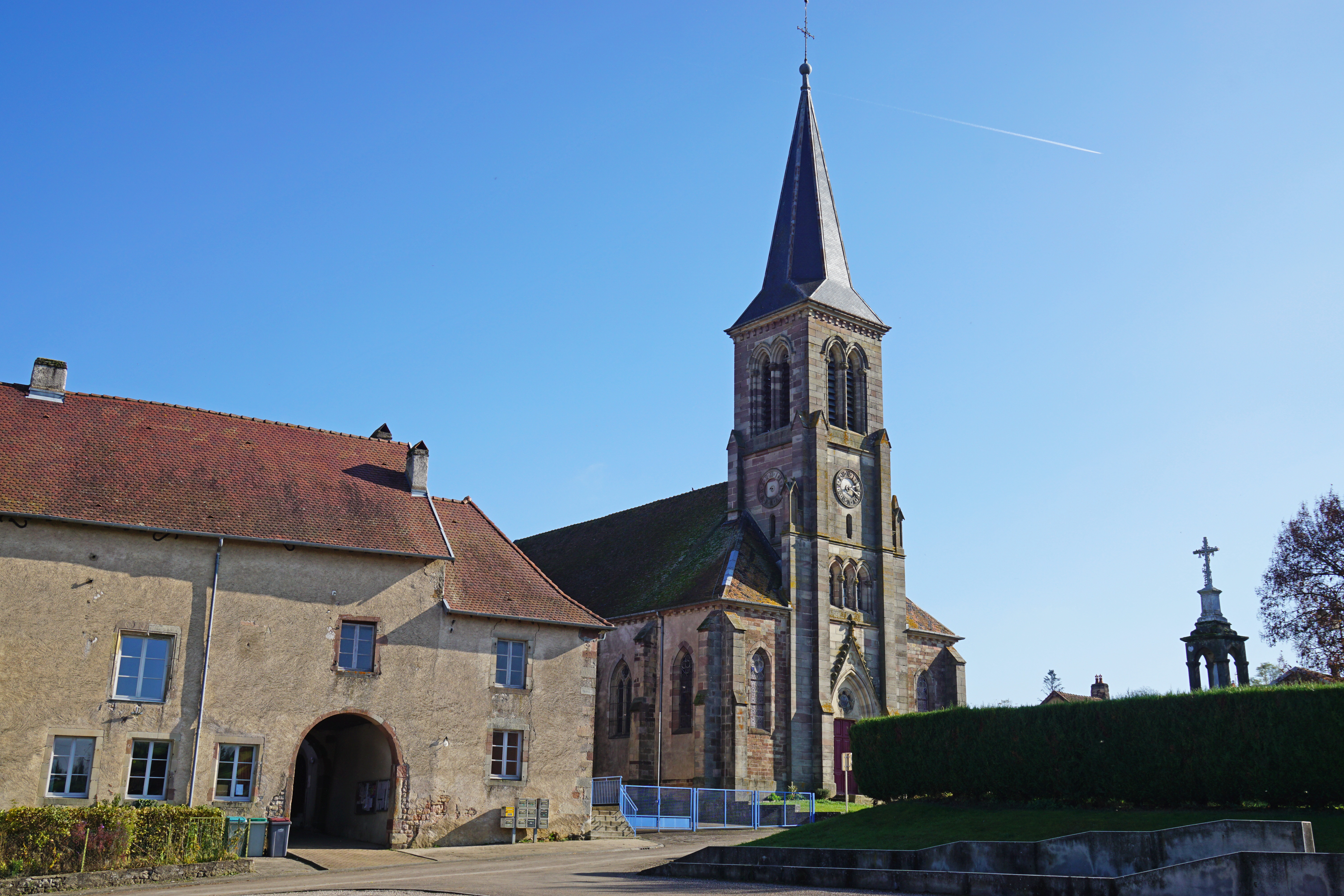
- The town hall and church in La Villedieu-en-Fontenette

- Coat of arms
- Location of La Villedieu-en-Fontenette
- Location within France Location within Bourgogne-Franche-Comté
- Coordinates: 47°46′23″N 6°11′54″E
- Country: France
- Region: Bourgogne-Franche-Comté
- Department: Haute-Saône
- Arrondissement: Lure
- Canton: Saint-Loup-sur-Semouse

Government
  - Mayor (2020–2026): Hervé Le Cain
- Area^{1}: 9.65 km^{2} (3.73 sq mi)
- Highest elevation: 397 m (1,302 ft)
- Lowest elevation: 225 m (738 ft)
- Population (2023): 167
  - Density: 17.3/km^{2} (44.8/sq mi)
- Time zone: UTC+01:00 (CET)
  - Summer (DST): UTC+02:00 (CEST)
- INSEE/Postal code: 70555 /70160
- ^{1} French Land Register data, which excludes lakes, ponds, glaciers > 1 km^{2} (0.386 sq mi or 247 acres) and river estuaries.

La Villedieu-en-Fontenette (French pronunciation: [la vildjø ɑ̃ fɔ̃tnɛt]) is a commune in the Haute-Saône department in the region of Bourgogne-Franche-Comté in eastern France.

== See also ==
- Communes of the Haute-Saône department
