= Magnoncourt =

- Commune
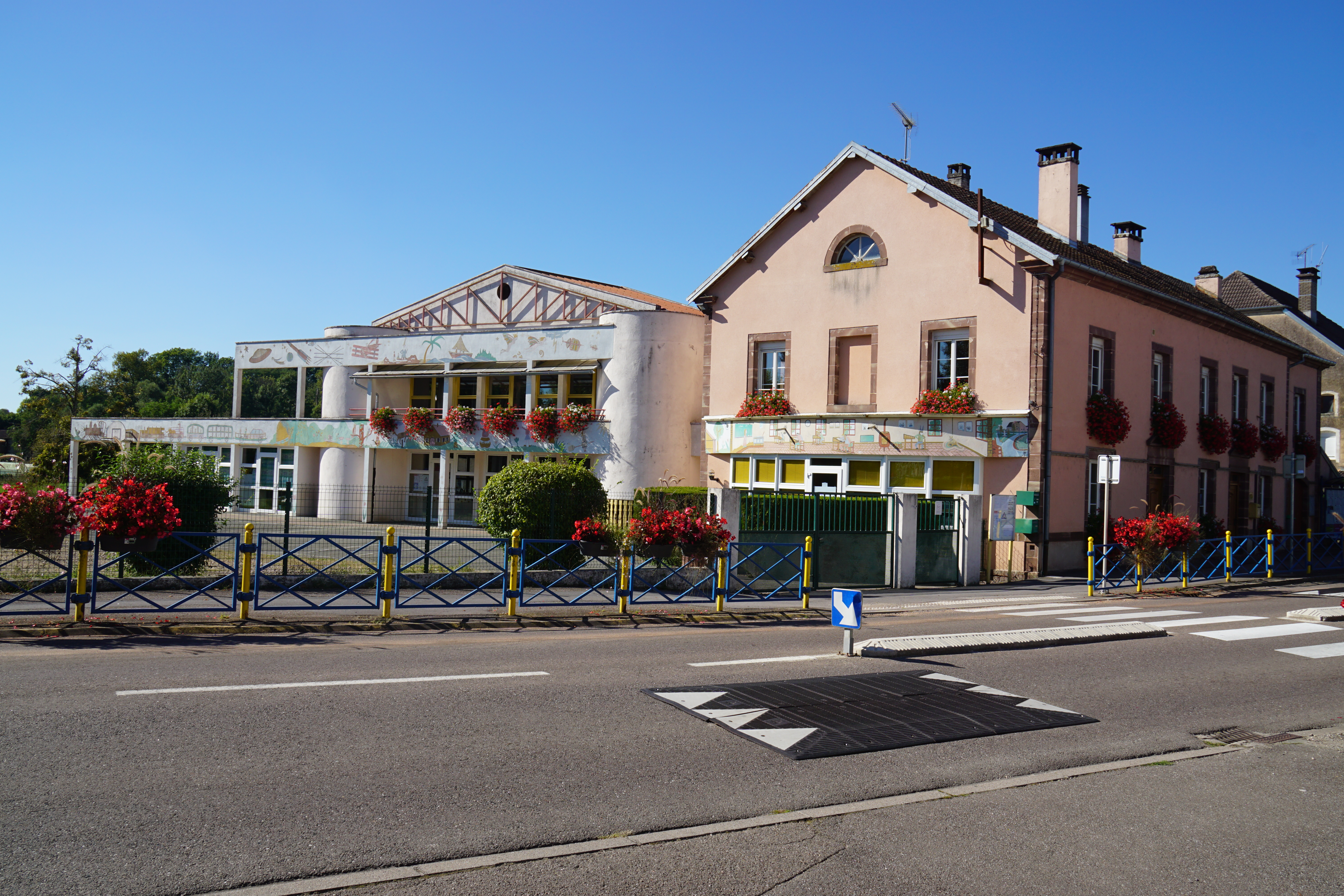
- The town hall and school in Magnoncourt

- Coat of arms
- Location of Magnoncourt
- Location within France Location within Bourgogne-Franche-Comté
- Coordinates: 47°53′41″N 6°17′10″E
- Country: France
- Region: Bourgogne-Franche-Comté
- Department: Haute-Saône
- Arrondissement: Lure
- Canton: Saint-Loup-sur-Semouse

Government
  - Mayor (2020–2026): Claude Rebourcet
- Area^{1}: 6.67 km^{2} (2.58 sq mi)
- Highest elevation: 291 m (955 ft)
- Lowest elevation: 242 m (794 ft)
- Population (2023): 390
  - Density: 58/km^{2} (150/sq mi)
- Time zone: UTC+01:00 (CET)
  - Summer (DST): UTC+02:00 (CEST)
- INSEE/Postal code: 70315 /70800
- ^{1} French Land Register data, which excludes lakes, ponds, glaciers > 1 km^{2} (0.386 sq mi or 247 acres) and river estuaries.

Magnoncourt (French pronunciation: [maɲɔ̃kuʁ]) is a commune in the Haute-Saône department in the region of Bourgogne-Franche-Comté in eastern France.

== See also ==
- Communes of the Haute-Saône department
