= Visoncourt =

- Commune
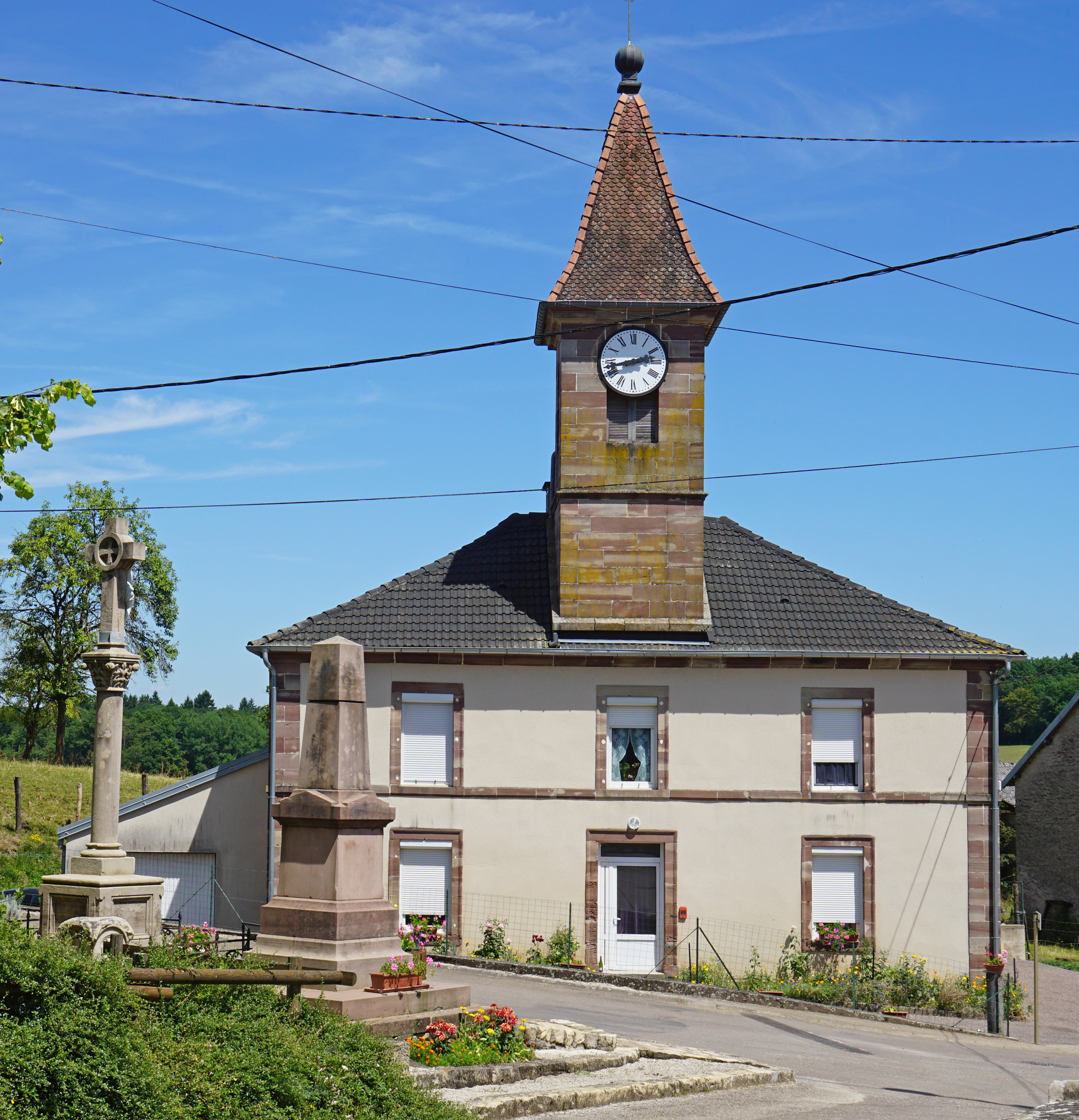
- The town hall in Visoncourt
- Location of Visoncourt
- Location within France Location within Bourgogne-Franche-Comté
- Coordinates: 47°45′12″N 6°19′03″E
- Country: France
- Region: Bourgogne-Franche-Comté
- Department: Haute-Saône
- Arrondissement: Lure
- Canton: Saint-Loup-sur-Semouse

Government
  - Mayor (2020–2026): Jean-Luc Veillon
- Area^{1}: 4.52 km^{2} (1.75 sq mi)
- Highest elevation: 395 m (1,296 ft)
- Lowest elevation: 264 m (866 ft)
- Population (2023): 36
  - Density: 8.0/km^{2} (21/sq mi)
- Time zone: UTC+01:00 (CET)
  - Summer (DST): UTC+02:00 (CEST)
- INSEE/Postal code: 70571 /70300
- ^{1} French Land Register data, which excludes lakes, ponds, glaciers > 1 km^{2} (0.386 sq mi or 247 acres) and river estuaries.

Visoncourt (French pronunciation: [vizɔ̃kuʁ]) is a commune in the Haute-Saône department in the region of Bourgogne-Franche-Comté in eastern France.

== See also ==
- Communes of the Haute-Saône department
