= Corbenay =

- Commune
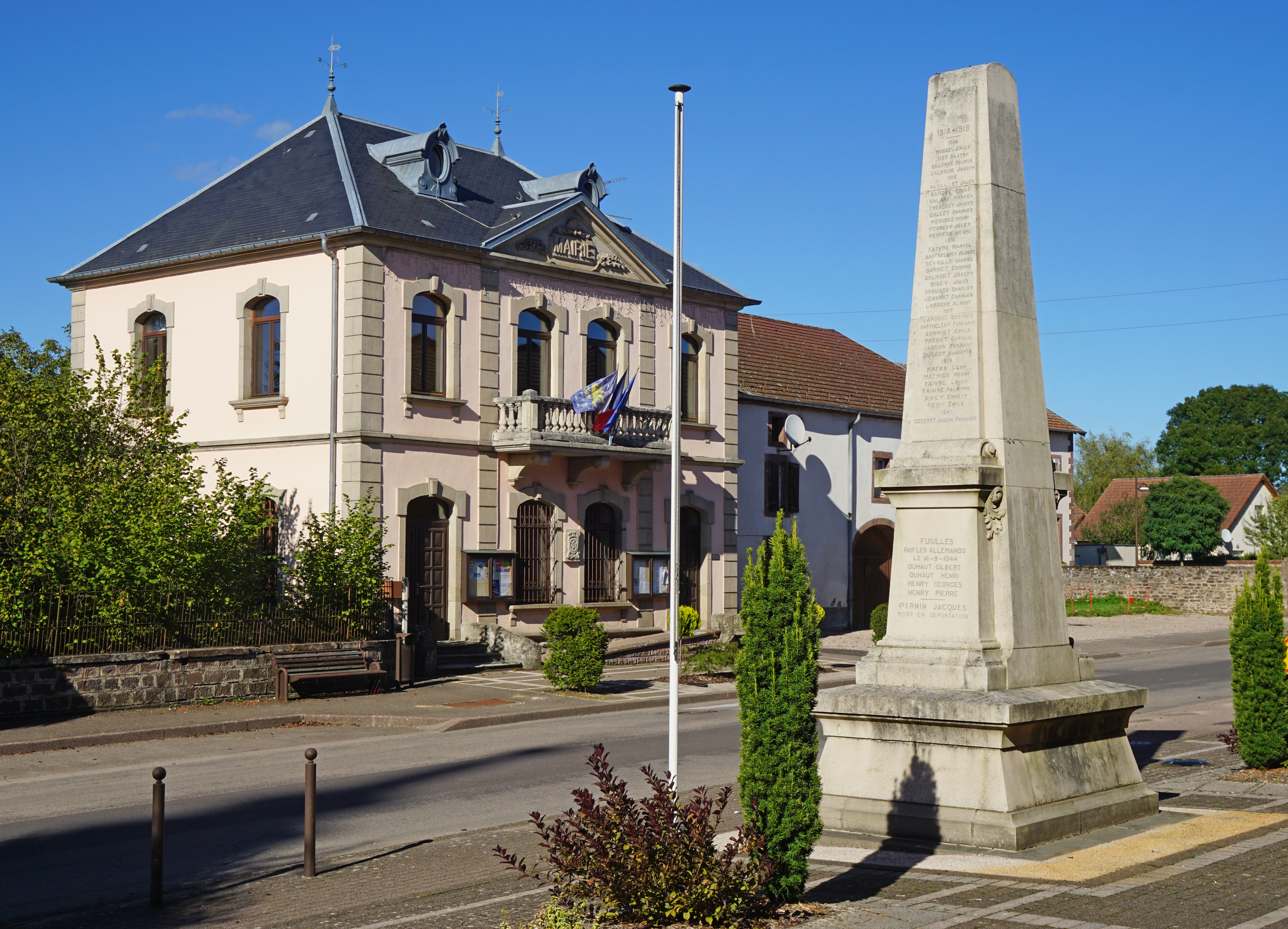
- The town hall and war memorial in Corbenay

- Coat of arms
- Location of Corbenay
- Location within France Location within Bourgogne-Franche-Comté
- Coordinates: 47°53′30″N 6°19′33″E
- Country: France
- Region: Bourgogne-Franche-Comté
- Department: Haute-Saône
- Arrondissement: Lure
- Canton: Saint-Loup-sur-Semouse

Government
  - Mayor (2022–2026): Gabriel Hamann
- Area^{1}: 15.73 km^{2} (6.07 sq mi)
- Highest elevation: 331 m (1,086 ft)
- Lowest elevation: 246 m (807 ft)
- Population (2023): 1,248
  - Density: 79.34/km^{2} (205.5/sq mi)
- Time zone: UTC+01:00 (CET)
  - Summer (DST): UTC+02:00 (CEST)
- INSEE/Postal code: 70171 /70320
- ^{1} French Land Register data, which excludes lakes, ponds, glaciers > 1 km^{2} (0.386 sq mi or 247 acres) and river estuaries.

Corbenay (French pronunciation: [kɔʁbənɛ]) is a commune in the Haute-Saône department in the region of Bourgogne-Franche-Comté in eastern France. Its coat of arms features a heraldic three hares motif.
