= Meurcourt =

- Commune
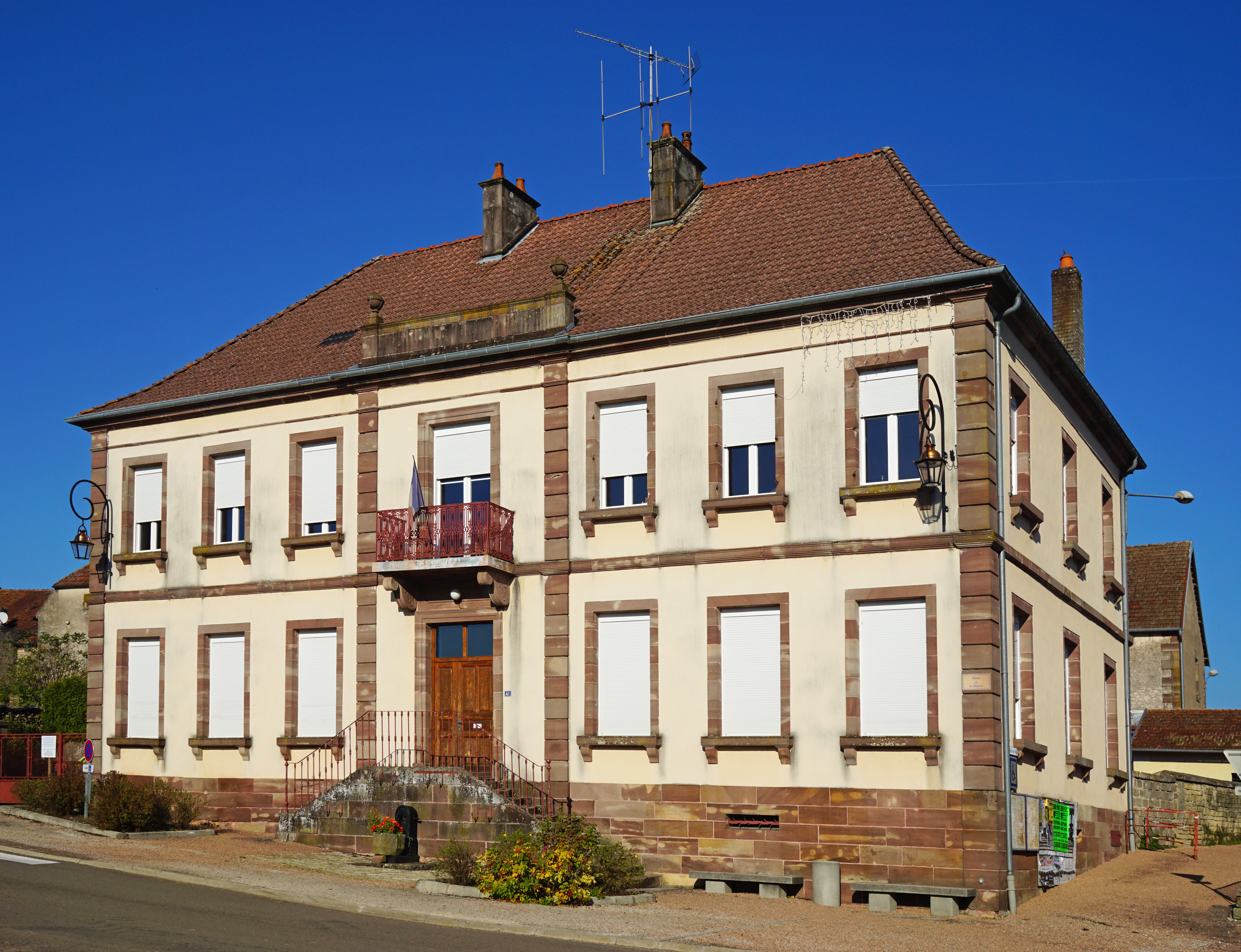
- The town hall in Meurcourt
- Location of Meurcourt
- Location within France Location within Bourgogne-Franche-Comté
- Coordinates: 47°46′21″N 6°14′02″E
- Country: France
- Region: Bourgogne-Franche-Comté
- Department: Haute-Saône
- Arrondissement: Lure
- Canton: Saint-Loup-sur-Semouse

Government
  - Mayor (2020–2026): Laurence Baumont
- Area^{1}: 11.89 km^{2} (4.59 sq mi)
- Highest elevation: 409 m (1,342 ft)
- Lowest elevation: 238 m (781 ft)
- Population (2023): 345
  - Density: 29.0/km^{2} (75.2/sq mi)
- Time zone: UTC+01:00 (CET)
  - Summer (DST): UTC+02:00 (CEST)
- INSEE/Postal code: 70344 /70300
- ^{1} French Land Register data, which excludes lakes, ponds, glaciers > 1 km^{2} (0.386 sq mi or 247 acres) and river estuaries.

Meurcourt (French pronunciation: [mœʁkuʁ]) is a commune in the Haute-Saône department in the region of Bourgogne-Franche-Comté in eastern France.

== See also ==
- Communes of the Haute-Saône department
