= Arboretum de la Cude =

Private arboretum near Mailleroncourt-Charette, Haute-Saône, Franche-Comté, France

Coordinates: 47.72°N 6.26°E

The Arboretum de la Cude (5 hectares) is a private arboretum located about 1 km outside Mailleroncourt-Charette, Haute-Saône, Franche-Comté, France. It is open daily; an admission fee is charged.

The arboretum was established in 1995 on a site under family ownership since 1880, which had been at various times a fruit orchard and a plantation of Pseudotsuga menziesii. Today it contains about 3,000 trees and bushes representing 450 species from all continents, including a good specimen of Chamaecyparis lawsoniana (planted 1900), as well as Araucaria, Ceratostigma willmottianum, × Chitalpa tashkentensis, Choisya ternata, Decaisnea fargesii, Ginkgo biloba, Koelreuteria paniculata, Leycesteria formosa, Ptelea trifoliata, Sequoia, Skimmia japonica, and Zelkova carpinifolia.

== See also ==
- List of botanical gardens in France
