= Mailleroncourt-Charette =

- Commune
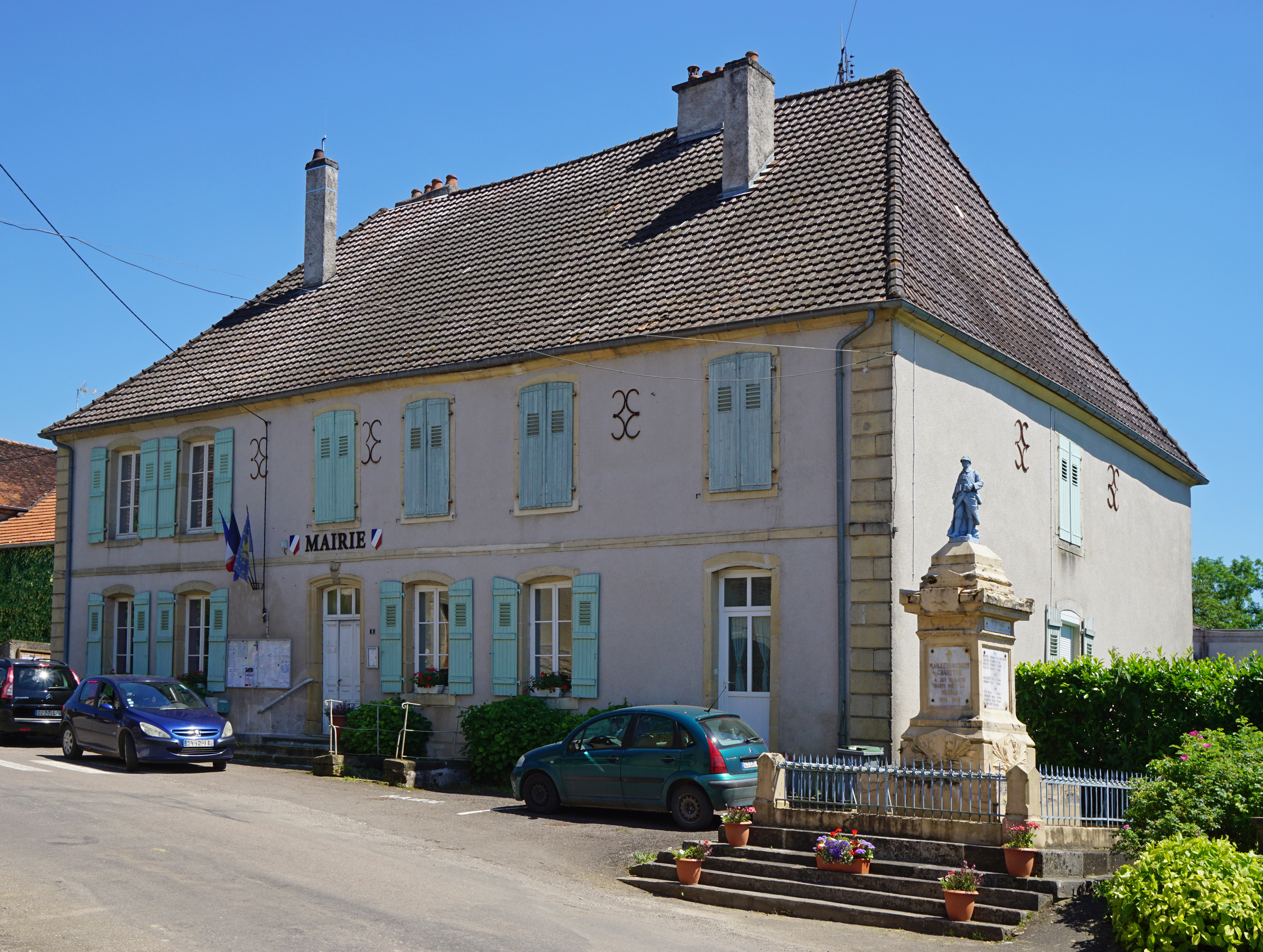
- The town hall in Mailleroncourt-Charette

- Coat of arms
- Location of Mailleroncourt-Charette
- Location within France Location within Bourgogne-Franche-Comté
- Coordinates: 47°43′40″N 6°15′37″E
- Country: France
- Region: Bourgogne-Franche-Comté
- Department: Haute-Saône
- Arrondissement: Lure
- Canton: Saint-Loup-sur-Semouse
- Area^{1}: 10.60 km^{2} (4.09 sq mi)
- Highest elevation: 360 m (1,180 ft)
- Lowest elevation: 241 m (791 ft)
- Population (2023): 277
  - Density: 26.1/km^{2} (67.7/sq mi)
- Time zone: UTC+01:00 (CET)
  - Summer (DST): UTC+02:00 (CEST)
- INSEE/Postal code: 70322 /70240
- ^{1} French Land Register data, which excludes lakes, ponds, glaciers > 1 km^{2} (0.386 sq mi or 247 acres) and river estuaries.

Mailleroncourt-Charette is a commune in the Haute-Saône department in the region of Bourgogne-Franche-Comté in eastern France.

== Points of interest ==
- Arboretum de la Cude

== See also ==
- Communes of the Haute-Saône department
