= La Vaivre =

- Commune
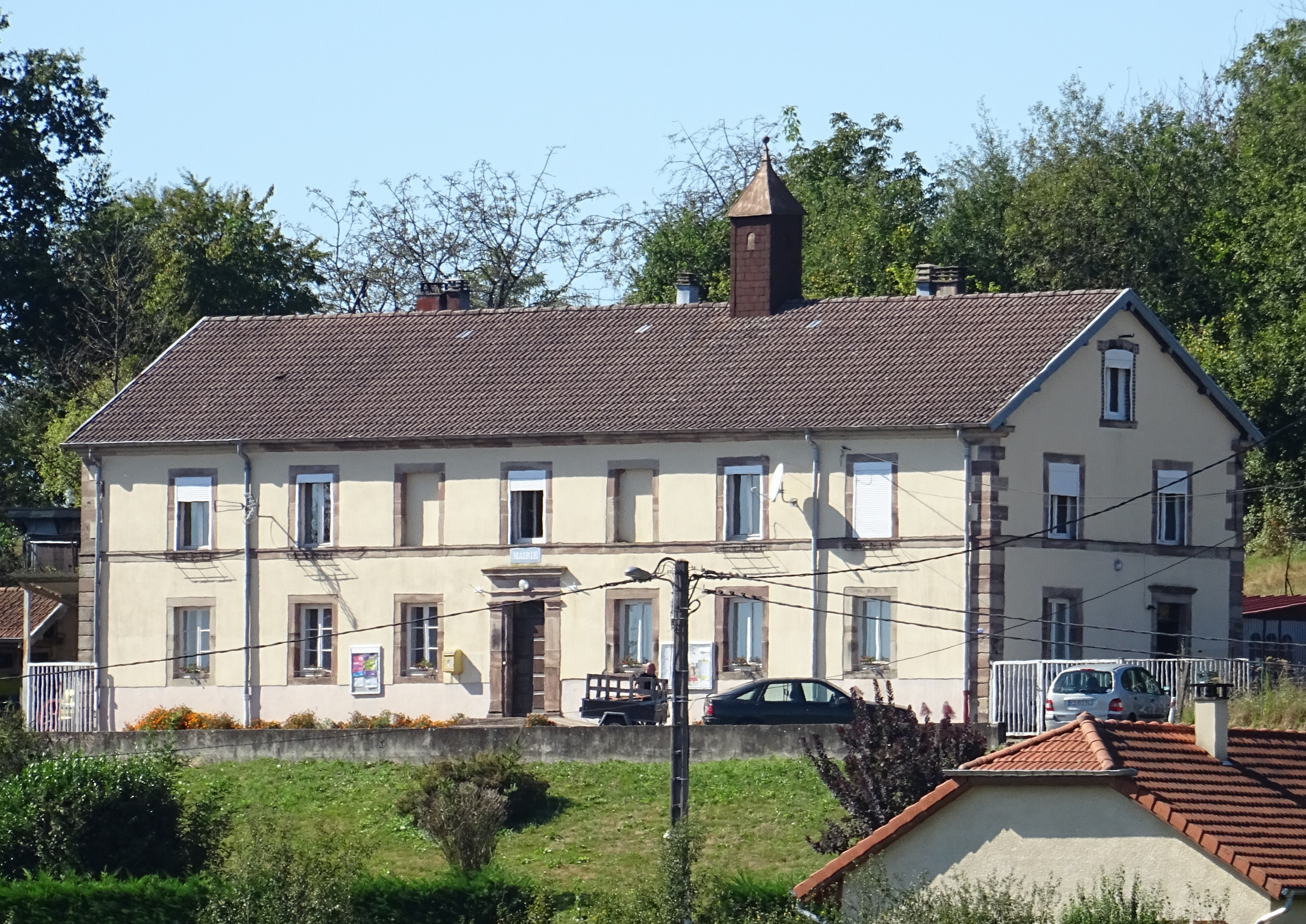
- The town hall in La Vaivre
- Location of La Vaivre
- Location within France Location within Bourgogne-Franche-Comté
- Coordinates: 47°54′56″N 6°22′05″E
- Country: France
- Region: Bourgogne-Franche-Comté
- Department: Haute-Saône
- Arrondissement: Lure
- Canton: Saint-Loup-sur-Semouse

Government
  - Mayor (2020–2026): Alain Robert
- Area^{1}: 3.04 km^{2} (1.17 sq mi)
- Highest elevation: 358 m (1,175 ft)
- Lowest elevation: 290 m (950 ft)
- Population (2023): 216
  - Density: 71.1/km^{2} (184/sq mi)
- Time zone: UTC+01:00 (CET)
  - Summer (DST): UTC+02:00 (CEST)
- INSEE/Postal code: 70512 /70320
- ^{1} French Land Register data, which excludes lakes, ponds, glaciers > 1 km^{2} (0.386 sq mi or 247 acres) and river estuaries.

La Vaivre (French pronunciation: [la vɛvʁ]) is a commune in the Haute-Saône department in the region of Bourgogne-Franche-Comté in eastern France.

== See also ==
- Communes of the Haute-Saône department
