= Hautevelle =

- Commune
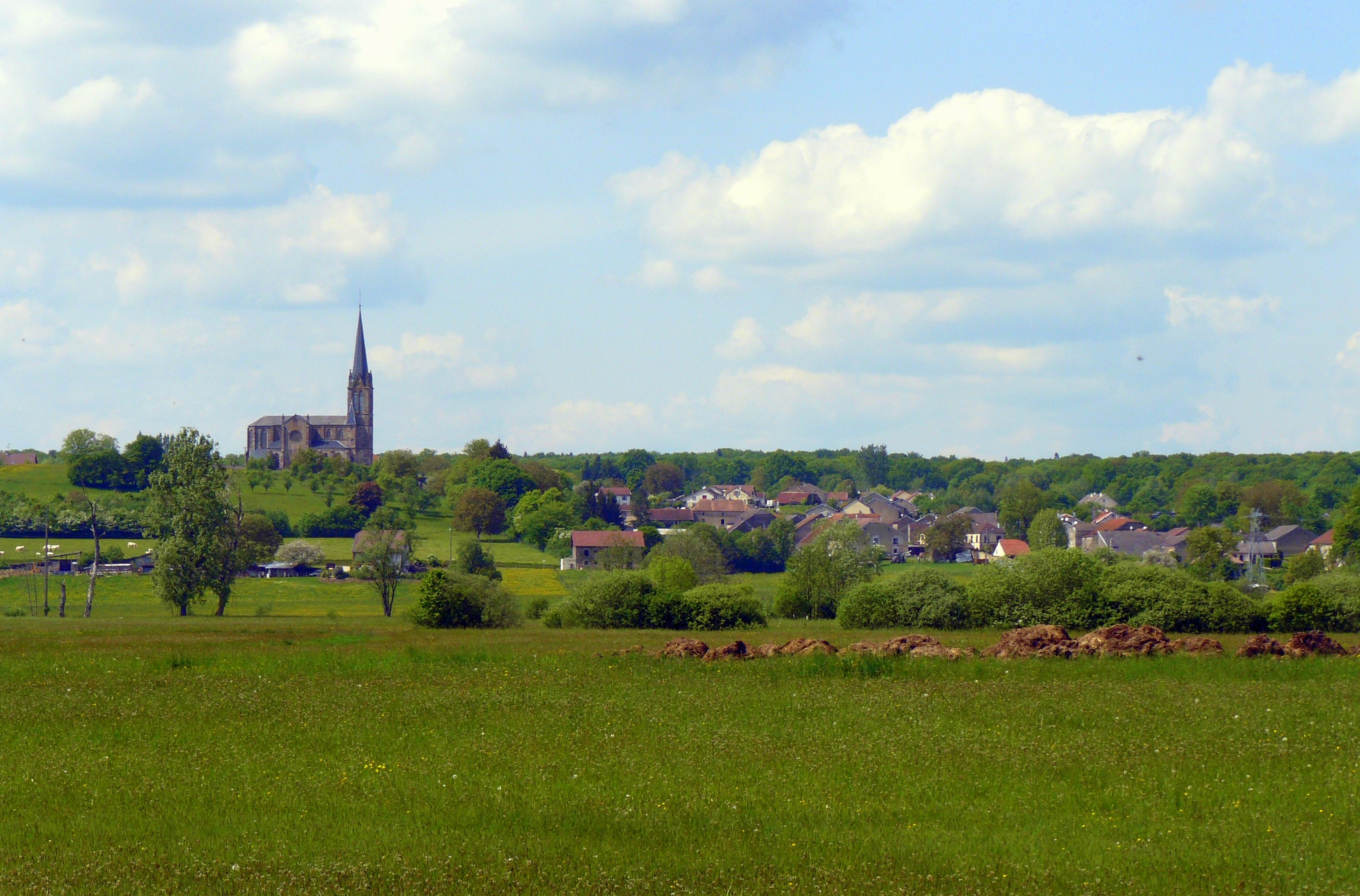
- A general view of Hautevelle

- Coat of arms
- Location of Hautevelle
- Location within France Location within Bourgogne-Franche-Comté
- Coordinates: 47°50′37″N 6°17′05″E
- Country: France
- Region: Bourgogne-Franche-Comté
- Department: Haute-Saône
- Arrondissement: Lure
- Canton: Saint-Loup-sur-Semouse
- Area^{1}: 7.78 km^{2} (3.00 sq mi)
- Highest elevation: 334 m (1,096 ft)
- Lowest elevation: 237 m (778 ft)
- Population (2023): 253
  - Density: 32.5/km^{2} (84.2/sq mi)
- Time zone: UTC+01:00 (CET)
  - Summer (DST): UTC+02:00 (CEST)
- INSEE/Postal code: 70284 /70800
- ^{1} French Land Register data, which excludes lakes, ponds, glaciers > 1 km^{2} (0.386 sq mi or 247 acres) and river estuaries.

Hautevelle (French pronunciation: [ot.vɛl]) is a commune in the Haute-Saône department, in the region of Bourgogne-Franche-Comté, eastern France.

== See also ==
- Communes of the Haute-Saône department
