= Villers-lès-Luxeuil =

- Commune
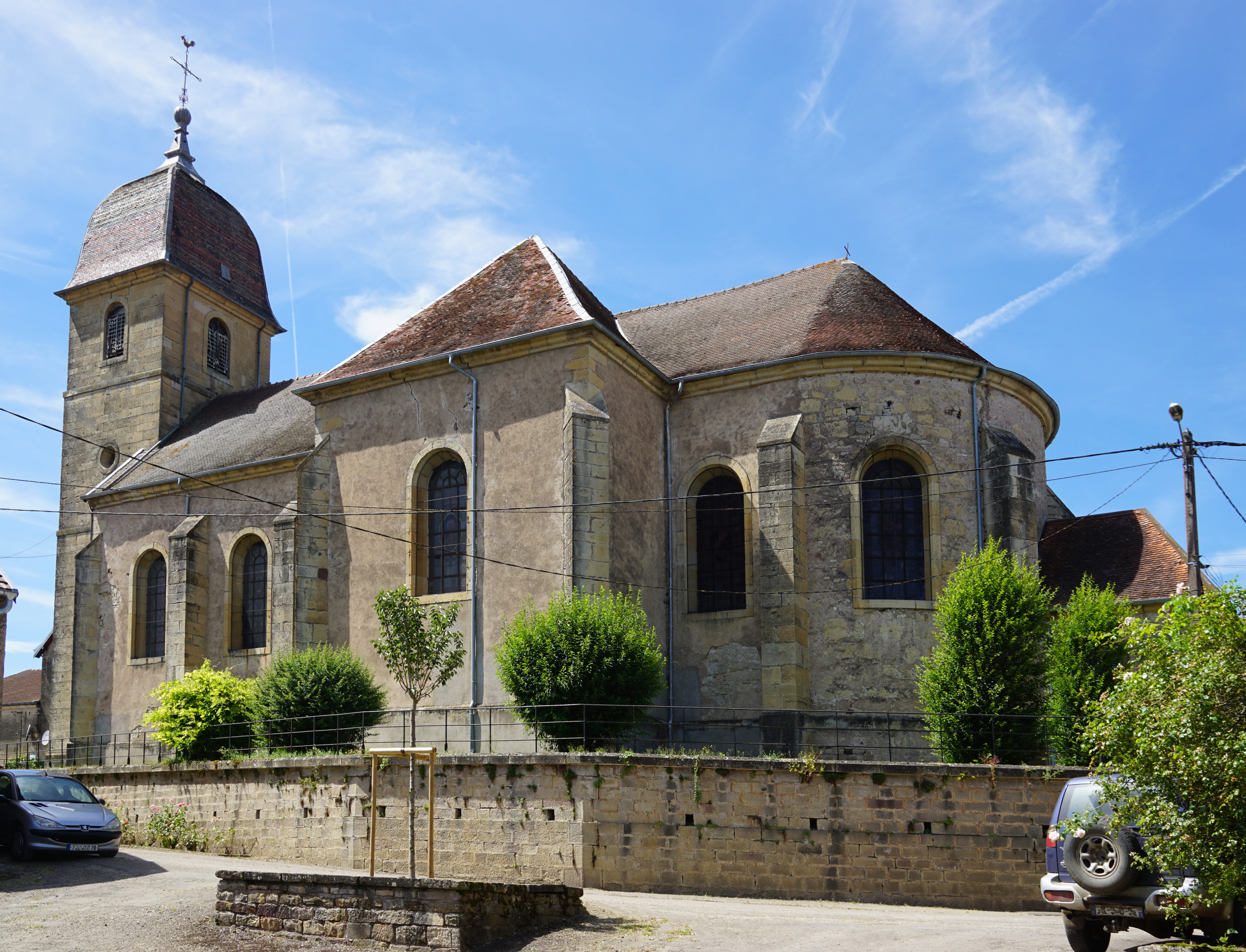
- The church in Villers-lès-Luxeuil
- Location of Villers-lès-Luxeuil
- Location within France Location within Bourgogne-Franche-Comté
- Coordinates: 47°46′21″N 6°17′14″E
- Country: France
- Region: Bourgogne-Franche-Comté
- Department: Haute-Saône
- Arrondissement: Lure
- Canton: Saint-Loup-sur-Semouse
- Area^{1}: 9.10 km^{2} (3.51 sq mi)
- Highest elevation: 395 m (1,296 ft)
- Lowest elevation: 253 m (830 ft)
- Population (2023): 310
  - Density: 34/km^{2} (88/sq mi)
- Time zone: UTC+01:00 (CET)
  - Summer (DST): UTC+02:00 (CEST)
- INSEE/Postal code: 70564 /70300
- ^{1} French Land Register data, which excludes lakes, ponds, glaciers > 1 km^{2} (0.386 sq mi or 247 acres) and river estuaries.

Villers-lès-Luxeuil is a commune in the Haute-Saône department in the region of Bourgogne-Franche-Comté in eastern France.

== See also ==
- Communes of the Haute-Saône department
