= Velorcey =

- Commune
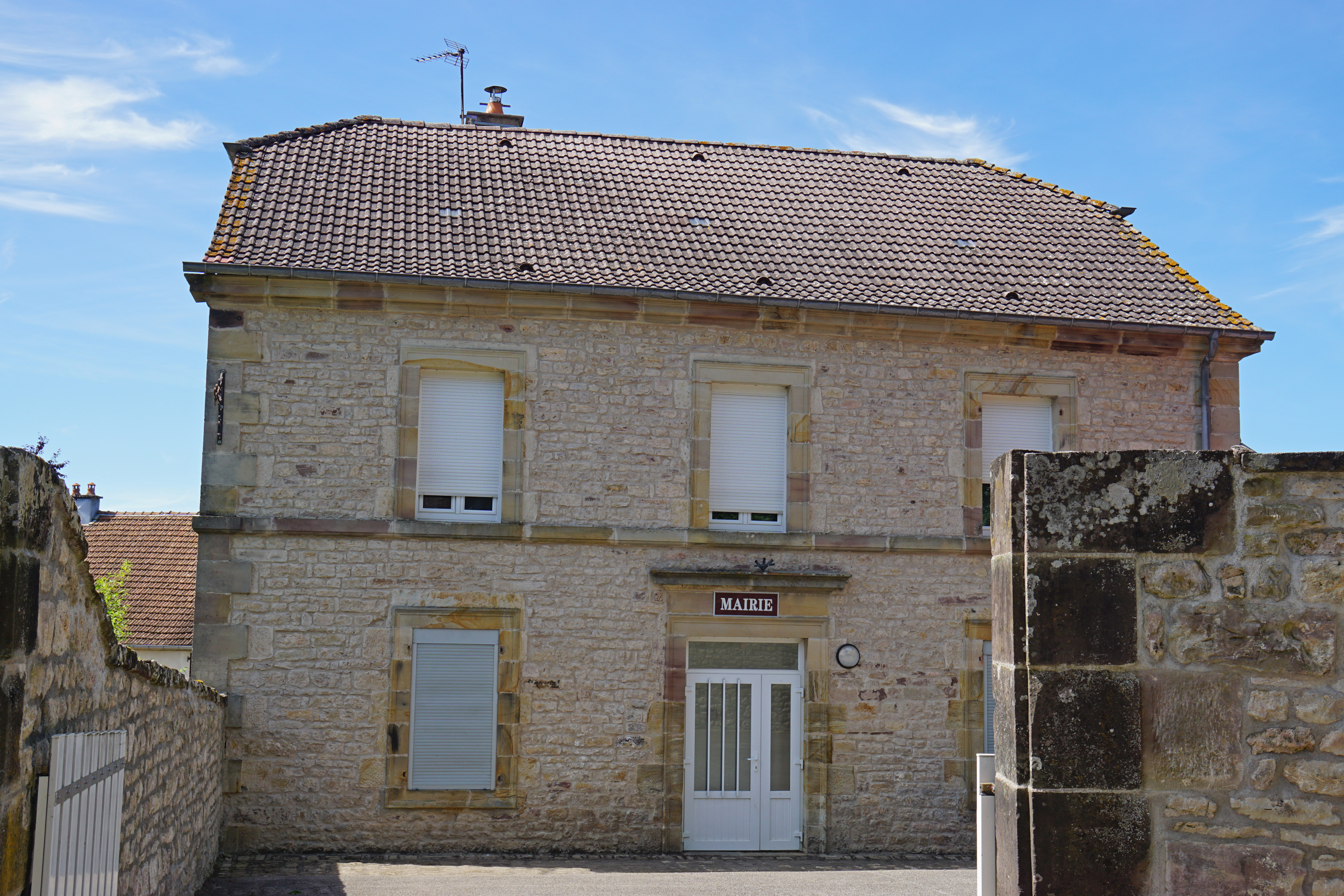
- The town hall in Velorcey

- Coat of arms
- Location of Velorcey
- Location within France Location within Bourgogne-Franche-Comté
- Coordinates: 47°46′43″N 6°15′08″E
- Country: France
- Region: Bourgogne-Franche-Comté
- Department: Haute-Saône
- Arrondissement: Lure
- Canton: Saint-Loup-sur-Semouse
- Area^{1}: 6.18 km^{2} (2.39 sq mi)
- Highest elevation: 310 m (1,020 ft)
- Lowest elevation: 237 m (778 ft)
- Population (2023): 206
  - Density: 33.3/km^{2} (86.3/sq mi)
- Time zone: UTC+01:00 (CET)
  - Summer (DST): UTC+02:00 (CEST)
- INSEE/Postal code: 70541 /70300
- ^{1} French Land Register data, which excludes lakes, ponds, glaciers > 1 km^{2} (0.386 sq mi or 247 acres) and river estuaries.

Velorcey is a commune in the Haute-Saône department in the region of Bourgogne-Franche-Comté in eastern France.

Velorcey is situated in the Haute-Saône (Bourgogne-Franche-Comté region) in the north-east of France at 19 km from Vesoul, the department capital. (General information: Velorcey is 312 km from Paris).

Popular places to visit nearby include Vesoul at 19 km and Ronchamp chapel at 29 km.

== See also ==
- Communes of the Haute-Saône department
