= Éhuns =

- Commune
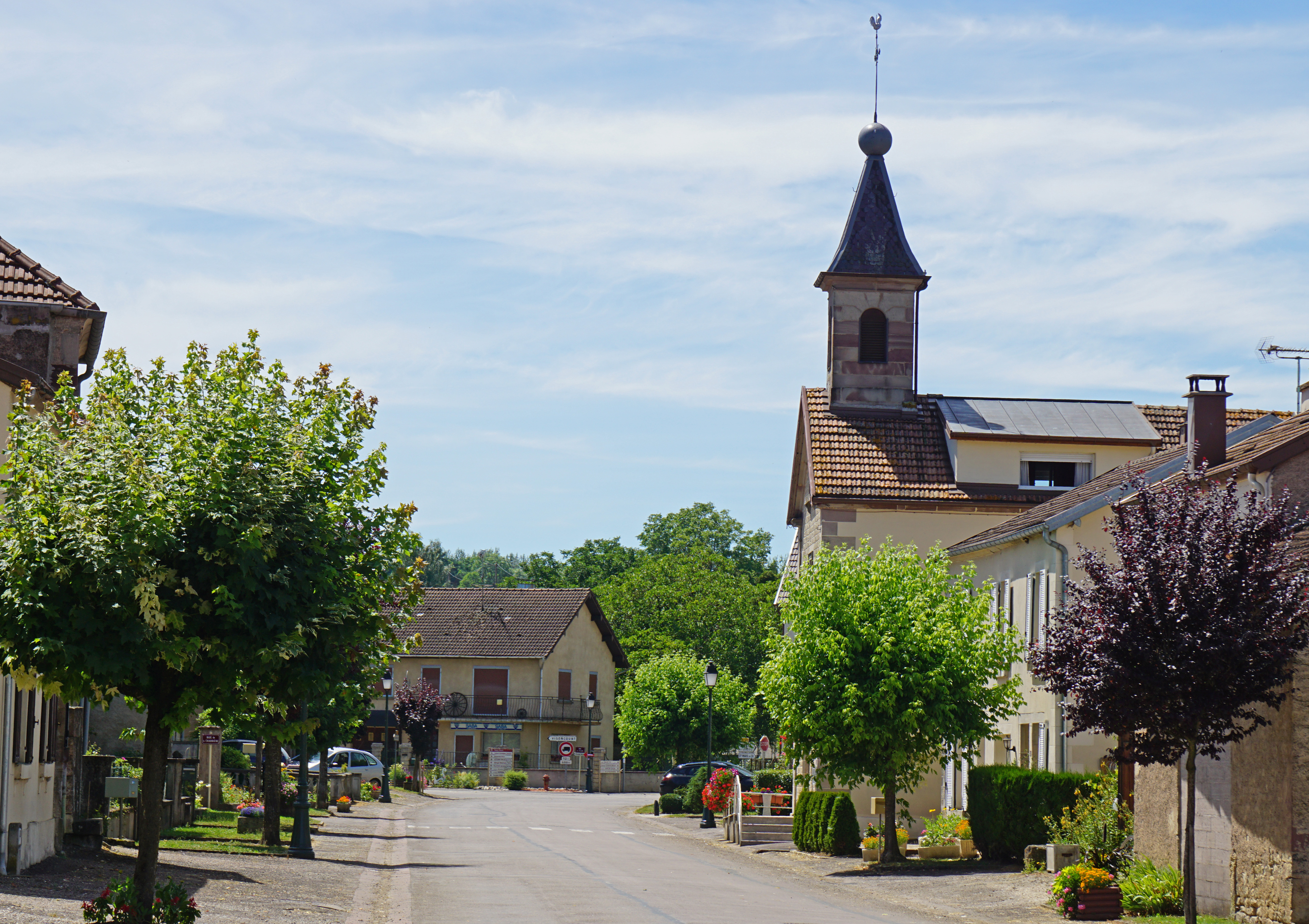
- The bell tower and surroundings in Éhuns
- Location of Éhuns
- Location within France Location within Bourgogne-Franche-Comté
- Coordinates: 47°46′25″N 6°18′47″E
- Country: France
- Region: Bourgogne-Franche-Comté
- Department: Haute-Saône
- Arrondissement: Lure
- Canton: Saint-Loup-sur-Semouse

Government
  - Mayor (2020–2026): Laurent Tard
- Area^{1}: 5.53 km^{2} (2.14 sq mi)
- Highest elevation: 407 m (1,335 ft)
- Lowest elevation: 254 m (833 ft)
- Population (2023): 223
  - Density: 40.3/km^{2} (104/sq mi)
- Time zone: UTC+01:00 (CET)
  - Summer (DST): UTC+02:00 (CEST)
- INSEE/Postal code: 70213 /70300
- ^{1} French Land Register data, which excludes lakes, ponds, glaciers > 1 km^{2} (0.386 sq mi or 247 acres) and river estuaries.

Éhuns (French pronunciation: [e.œ̃]) is a commune in the Haute-Saône department in the region of Bourgogne-Franche-Comté in eastern France.

== See also ==
- Communes of the Haute-Saône department
