= Conflandey =

- Commune
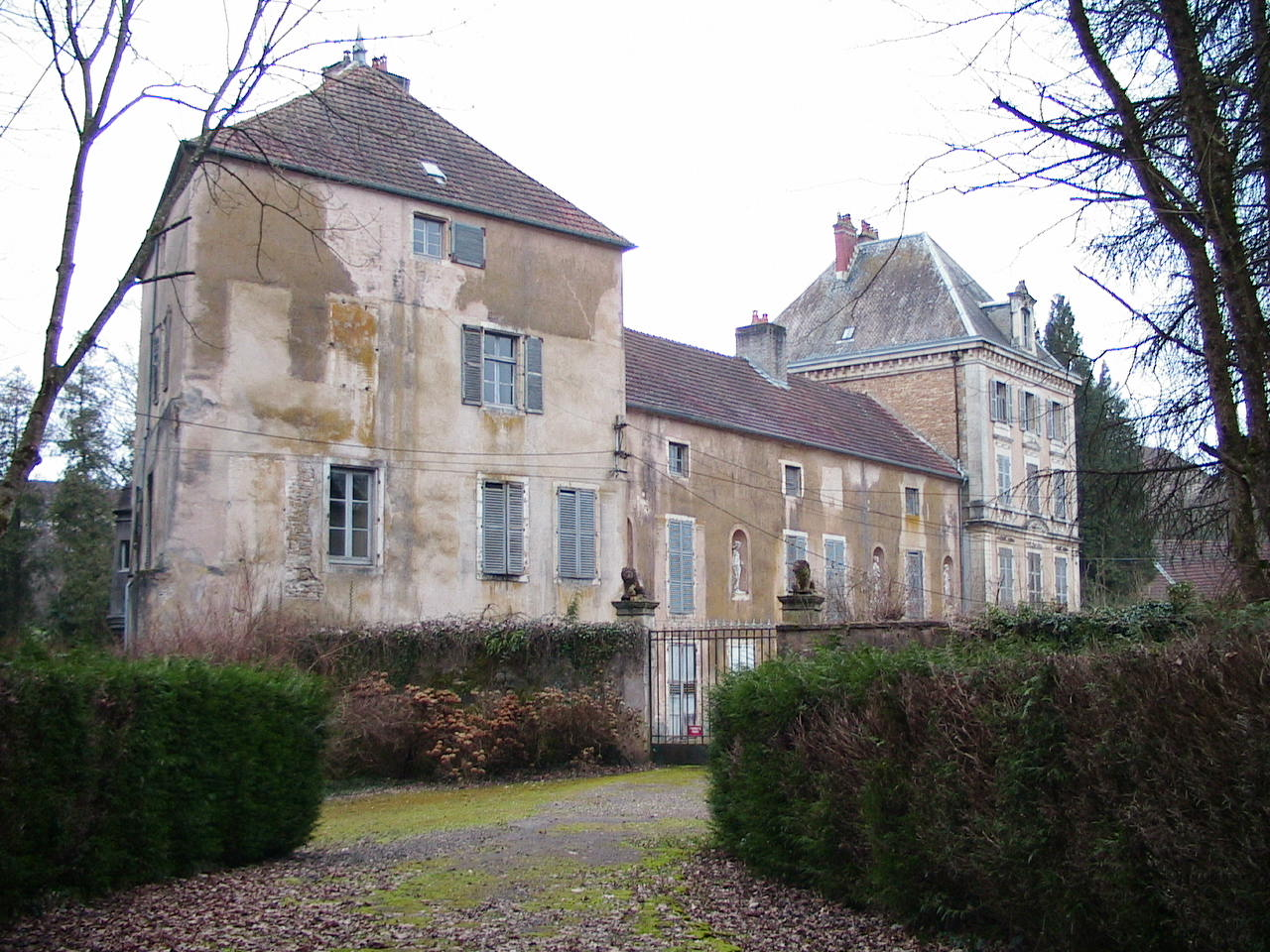
- The chateau in Conflandey

- Coat of arms
- Location of Conflandey
- Location within France Location within Bourgogne-Franche-Comté
- Coordinates: 47°43′43″N 6°02′41″E
- Country: France
- Region: Bourgogne-Franche-Comté
- Department: Haute-Saône
- Arrondissement: Vesoul
- Canton: Port-sur-Saône

Government
  - Mayor (2021–2026): Arnaud Durget
- Area^{1}: 5.30 km^{2} (2.05 sq mi)
- Highest elevation: 256 m (840 ft)
- Lowest elevation: 207 m (679 ft)
- Population (2023): 360
  - Density: 68/km^{2} (180/sq mi)
- Time zone: UTC+01:00 (CET)
  - Summer (DST): UTC+02:00 (CEST)
- INSEE/Postal code: 70167 /70170
- ^{1} French Land Register data, which excludes lakes, ponds, glaciers > 1 km^{2} (0.386 sq mi or 247 acres) and river estuaries.

Conflandey (French pronunciation: [kɔ̃flɑ̃dɛ]) is a commune in the Haute-Saône department in the region of Bourgogne-Franche-Comté in eastern France.

== See also ==
- Communes of the Haute-Saône department
