= Bourguignon-lès-Conflans =

- Commune
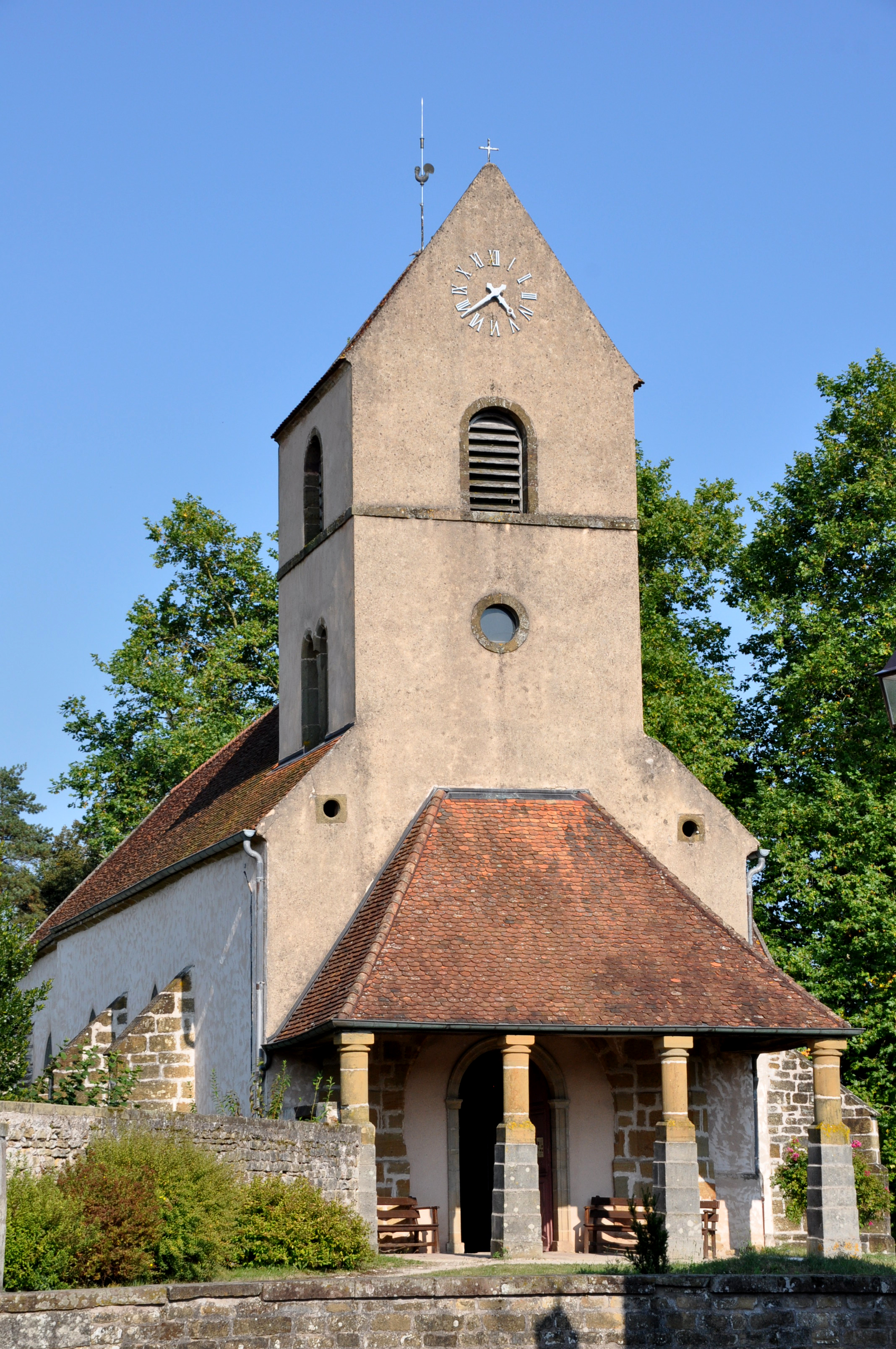
- The church in Bourguignon-lès-Conflans

- Coat of arms
- Location of Bourguignon-lès-Conflans
- Location within France Location within Bourgogne-Franche-Comté
- Coordinates: 47°48′24″N 6°09′52″E
- Country: France
- Region: Bourgogne-Franche-Comté
- Department: Haute-Saône
- Arrondissement: Lure
- Canton: Port-sur-Saône

Government
  - Mayor (2020–2026): Cédric Noly
- Area^{1}: 8.02 km^{2} (3.10 sq mi)
- Highest elevation: 310 m (1,020 ft)
- Lowest elevation: 217 m (712 ft)
- Population (2023): 129
  - Density: 16.1/km^{2} (41.7/sq mi)
- Time zone: UTC+01:00 (CET)
  - Summer (DST): UTC+02:00 (CEST)
- INSEE/Postal code: 70087 /70800
- ^{1} French Land Register data, which excludes lakes, ponds, glaciers > 1 km^{2} (0.386 sq mi or 247 acres) and river estuaries.

Bourguignon-lès-Conflans (French pronunciation: [buʁɡiɲɔ̃ lɛ kɔ̃flɑ̃], literally Bourguignon near Conflans) is a commune in the Haute-Saône department in the region of Bourgogne-Franche-Comté in eastern France.

== See also ==
- Communes of the Haute-Saône department
