= Plainemont =

- Commune
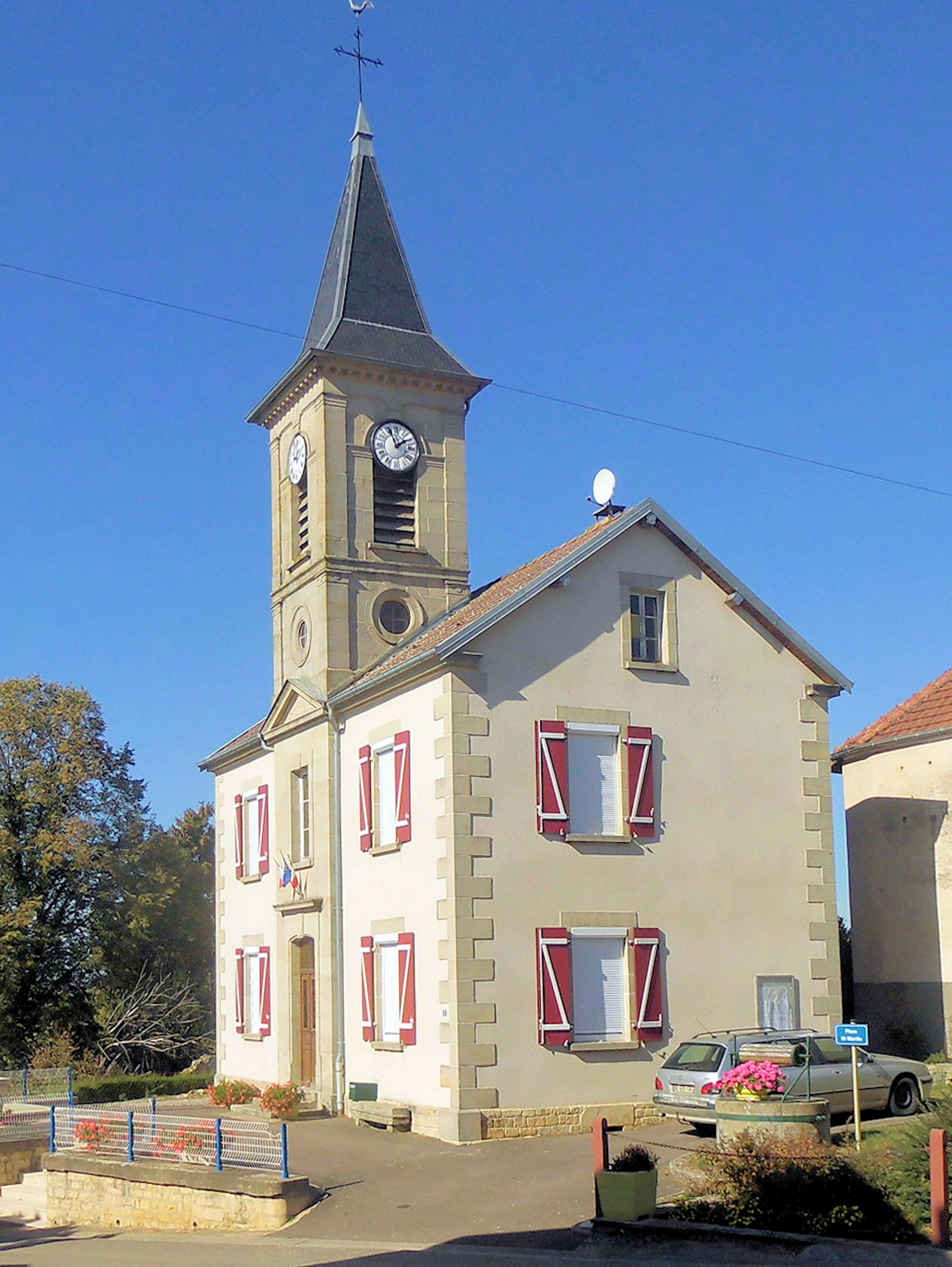
- The town hall in Plainemont
- Location of Plainemont
- Location within France Location within Bourgogne-Franche-Comté
- Coordinates: 47°51′15″N 6°13′08″E
- Country: France
- Region: Bourgogne-Franche-Comté
- Department: Haute-Saône
- Arrondissement: Lure
- Canton: Port-sur-Saône

Government
  - Mayor (2020–2026): Bernard Galmiche
- Area^{1}: 3.30 km^{2} (1.27 sq mi)
- Highest elevation: 303 m (994 ft)
- Lowest elevation: 226 m (741 ft)
- Population (2023): 63
  - Density: 19/km^{2} (49/sq mi)
- Time zone: UTC+01:00 (CET)
  - Summer (DST): UTC+02:00 (CEST)
- INSEE/Postal code: 70412 /70800
- ^{1} French Land Register data, which excludes lakes, ponds, glaciers > 1 km^{2} (0.386 sq mi or 247 acres) and river estuaries.

Plainemont (French pronunciation: [plɛnmɔ̃]) is a commune in the Haute-Saône department in the region of Bourgogne-Franche-Comté in eastern France.

== See also ==
- Communes of the Haute-Saône department
