= Francalmont =

- Commune
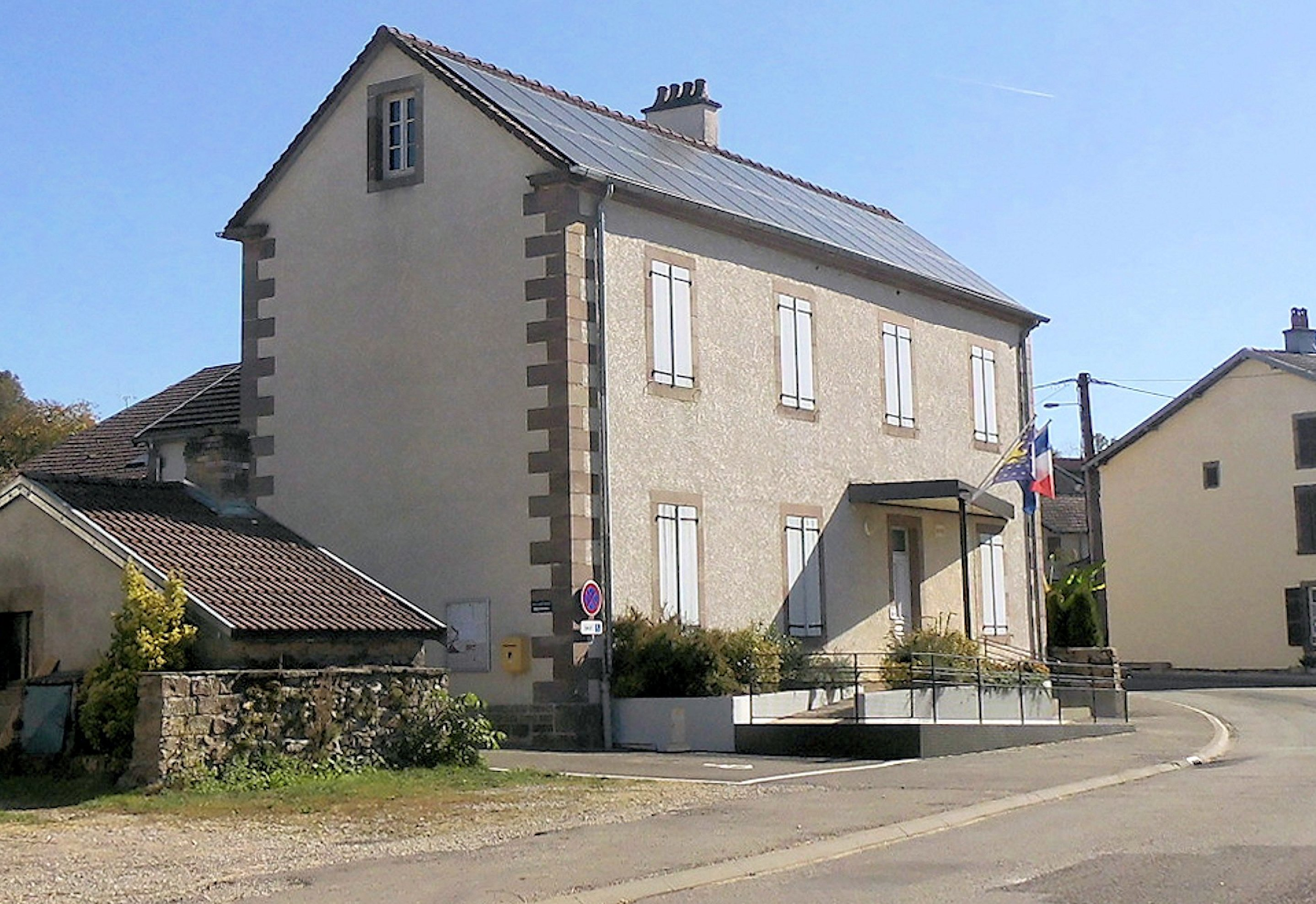
- The town hall in Francalmont
- Location of Francalmont
- Location within France Location within Bourgogne-Franche-Comté
- Coordinates: 47°50′20″N 6°16′07″E
- Country: France
- Region: Bourgogne-Franche-Comté
- Department: Haute-Saône
- Arrondissement: Lure
- Canton: Saint-Loup-sur-Semouse

Government
  - Mayor (2020–2026): Bernard Roger
- Area^{1}: 6.86 km^{2} (2.65 sq mi)
- Highest elevation: 304 m (997 ft)
- Lowest elevation: 234 m (768 ft)
- Population (2023): 121
  - Density: 17.6/km^{2} (45.7/sq mi)
- Time zone: UTC+01:00 (CET)
  - Summer (DST): UTC+02:00 (CEST)
- INSEE/Postal code: 70249 /70800
- ^{1} French Land Register data, which excludes lakes, ponds, glaciers > 1 km^{2} (0.386 sq mi or 247 acres) and river estuaries.

Francalmont (French pronunciation: [fʁɑ̃kalmɔ̃]) is a commune in the Haute-Saône department in the region of Bourgogne-Franche-Comté in eastern France.

== See also ==
- Communes of the Haute-Saône department
