= Abelcourt =

- Commune
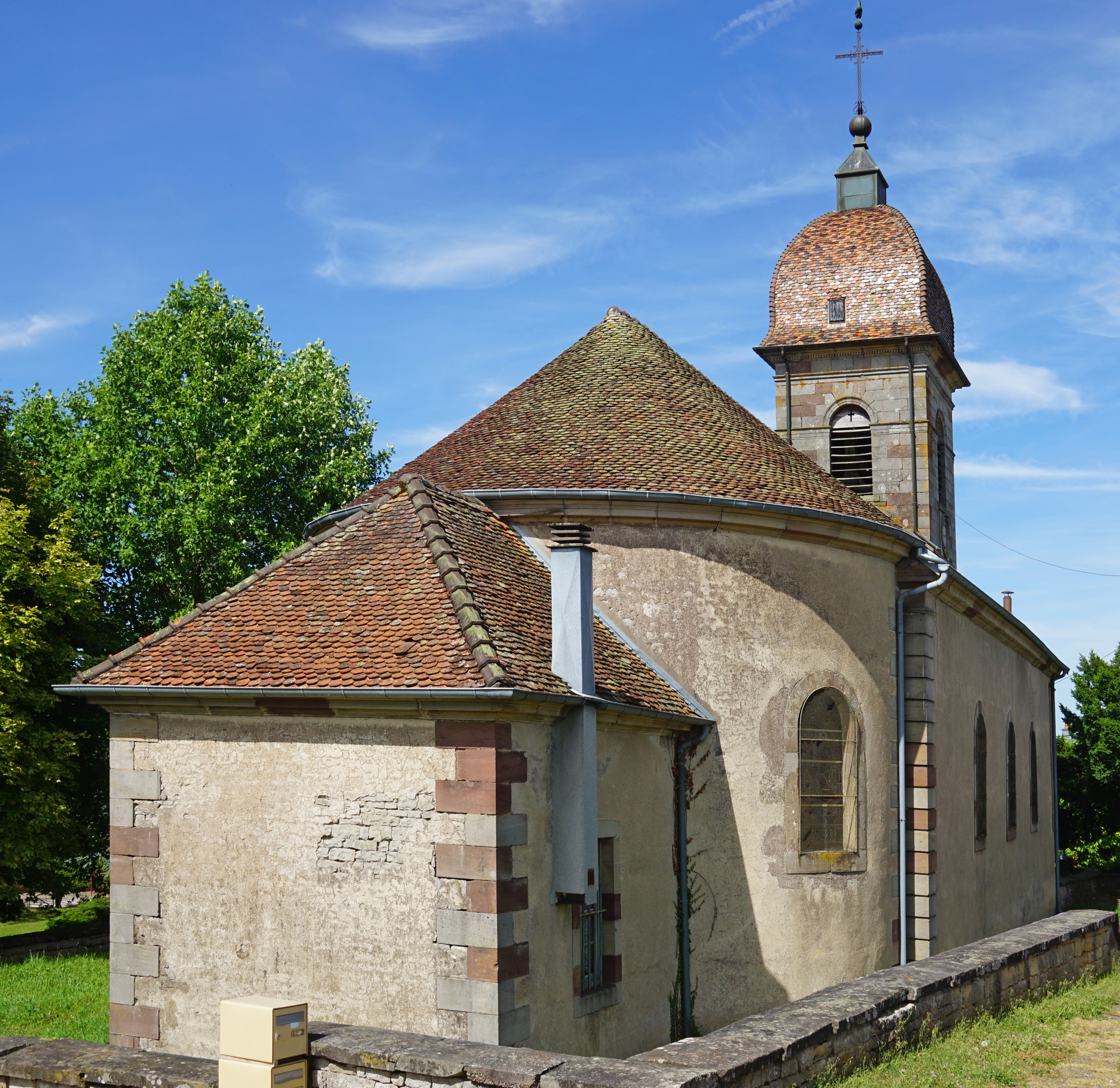
- The church in Abelcourt
- Location of Abelcourt
- Location within France Location within Bourgogne-Franche-Comté
- Coordinates: 47°47′09″N 6°17′27″E
- Country: France
- Region: Bourgogne-Franche-Comté
- Department: Haute-Saône
- Arrondissement: Lure
- Canton: Saint-Loup-sur-Semouse
- Intercommunality: Triangle Vert

Government
  - Mayor (2020–2026): Bernard Jamey
- Area^{1}: 7.46 km^{2} (2.88 sq mi)
- Highest elevation: 302 m (991 ft)
- Lowest elevation: 247 m (810 ft)
- Population (2023): 333
  - Density: 44.6/km^{2} (116/sq mi)
- Demonym(s): Abelcourtois, Abelcourtoises
- Time zone: UTC+01:00 (CET)
  - Summer (DST): UTC+02:00 (CEST)
- INSEE/Postal code: 70001 /70300
- ^{1} French Land Register data, which excludes lakes, ponds, glaciers > 1 km^{2} (0.386 sq mi or 247 acres) and river estuaries.

Abelcourt (French pronunciation: [abɛlkuʁ]) is a commune in the Haute-Saône department in the region of Bourgogne-Franche-Comté in eastern France.

== Population ==
Historical population

Year	Pop.	±% p.a.
1793	315	—
1821	367	+0.55%
1846	402	+0.37%
1872	346	−0.58%
1901	270	−0.85%
1926	196	−1.27%
1946	164	−0.89%
1962	172	+0.30%
1968	157	−1.51%

Year	Pop.	±% p.a.
1975	144	−1.23%
1982	229	+6.85%
1990	253	+1.25%
1999	303	+2.02%
2007	319	+0.65%
2012	348	+1.76%
2017	354	+0.34%
2023	333	−1.01%

Source: EHESS (1793-1999) and INSEE

== See also ==
- Communes of the Haute-Saône department
