= Ainvelle, Haute-Saône =

Ainvelle
- Commune
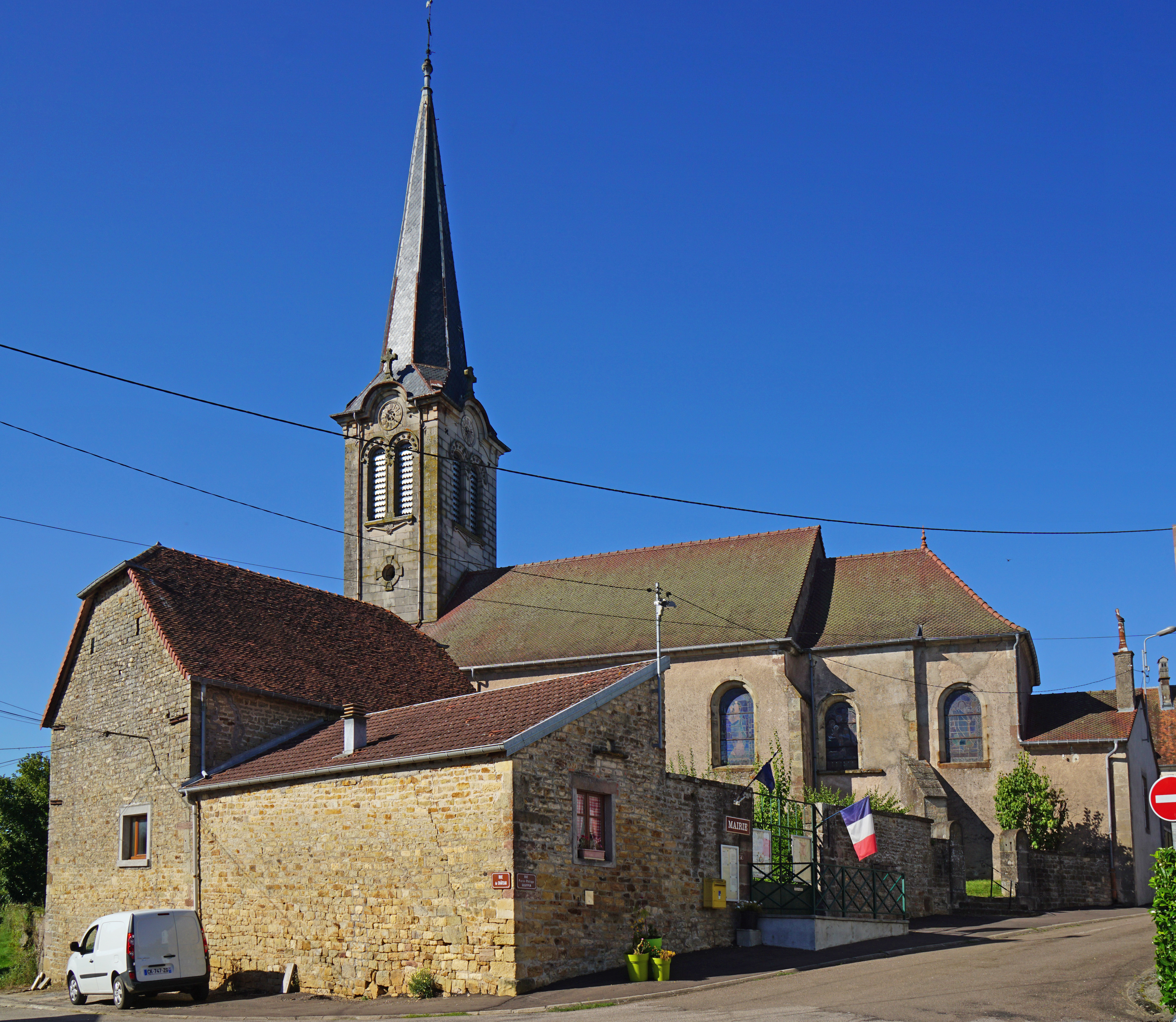
- The church and town hall in Ainvelle

- Coat of arms
- Location of Ainvelle
- Location within France Location within Bourgogne-Franche-Comté
- Coordinates: 47°50′51″N 6°15′05″E
- Country: France
- Region: Bourgogne-Franche-Comté
- Department: Haute-Saône
- Arrondissement: Lure
- Canton: Saint-Loup-sur-Semouse
- Intercommunality: Haute Comté

Government
  - Mayor (2020–2026): Philippe Labache
- Area^{1}: 6.75 km^{2} (2.61 sq mi)
- Highest elevation: 298 m (978 ft)
- Lowest elevation: 228 m (748 ft)
- Population (2023): 149
  - Density: 22.1/km^{2} (57.2/sq mi)
- Time zone: UTC+01:00 (CET)
  - Summer (DST): UTC+02:00 (CEST)
- INSEE/Postal code: 70008 /70800
- ^{1} French Land Register data, which excludes lakes, ponds, glaciers > 1 km^{2} (0.386 sq mi or 247 acres) and river estuaries.

Ainvelle (French pronunciation: [ɛ̃vɛl]) is a commune in the Haute-Saône département in the Bourgogne-Franche-Comté region of eastern France.

== Population ==
Historical population
Year	Pop.	±% p.a.
1968	157	—
1975	155	−0.18%
1982	191	+3.03%
1990	206	+0.95%
1999	219	+0.68%
2007	168	−3.26%
2012	154	−1.73%
2017	148	−0.79%
2023	149	+0.11%
Source: INSEE

== See also ==
- Communes of the Haute-Saône department
