= Saint-Loup-sur-Semouse =

- Commune
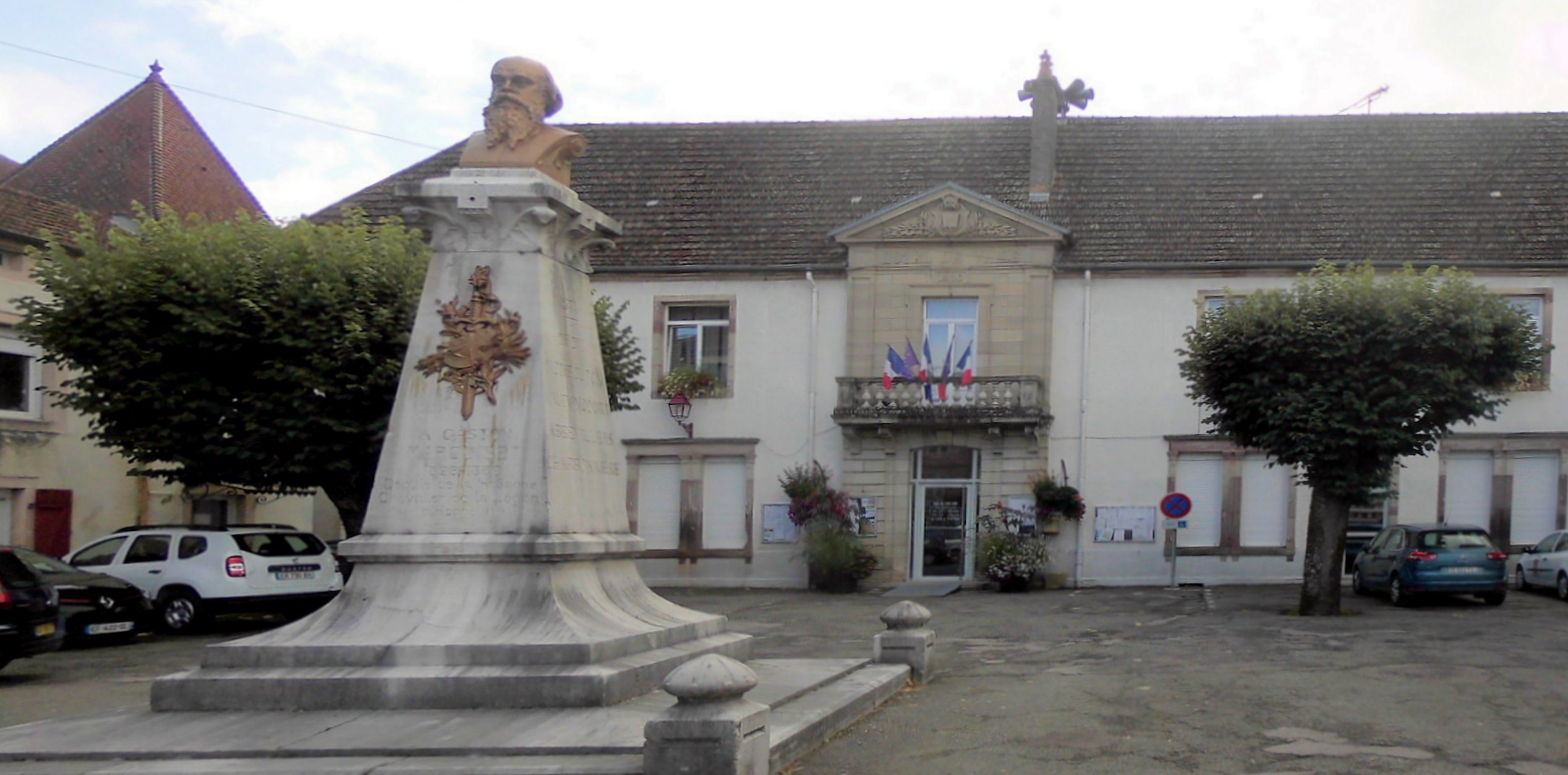
- The town hall and war memorial in Saint-Loup-sur-Semouse

- Coat of arms
- Location of Saint-Loup-sur-Semouse
- Location within France Location within Bourgogne-Franche-Comté
- Coordinates: 47°53′08″N 6°16′27″E
- Country: France
- Region: Bourgogne-Franche-Comté
- Department: Haute-Saône
- Arrondissement: Lure
- Canton: Saint-Loup-sur-Semouse

Government
  - Mayor (2020–2026): Thierry Bordot
- Area^{1}: 16.54 km^{2} (6.39 sq mi)
- Highest elevation: 315 m (1,033 ft)
- Lowest elevation: 231 m (758 ft)
- Population (2023): 2,814
  - Density: 170.1/km^{2} (440.6/sq mi)
- Time zone: UTC+01:00 (CET)
  - Summer (DST): UTC+02:00 (CEST)
- INSEE/Postal code: 70467 /70800
- ^{1} French Land Register data, which excludes lakes, ponds, glaciers > 1 km^{2} (0.386 sq mi or 247 acres) and river estuaries.

Saint-Loup-sur-Semouse (French pronunciation: [sɛ̃ lu syʁ səmuz], lit. 'Saint Loup on Semouse') is a commune in the Haute-Saône department in the region of Bourgogne-Franche-Comté in eastern France.

== Population ==
Historical population
Year	Pop.	±% p.a.
1968	3,468	—
1975	4,692	+4.41%
1982	4,907	+0.64%
1990	4,677	−0.60%
1999	4,291	−0.95%
2007	3,714	−1.79%
2012	3,314	−2.25%
2017	3,221	−0.57%
2023	2,814	−2.23%
Source: INSEE

== See also ==
- Communes of the Haute-Saône department
