= Ormoiche =

- Commune
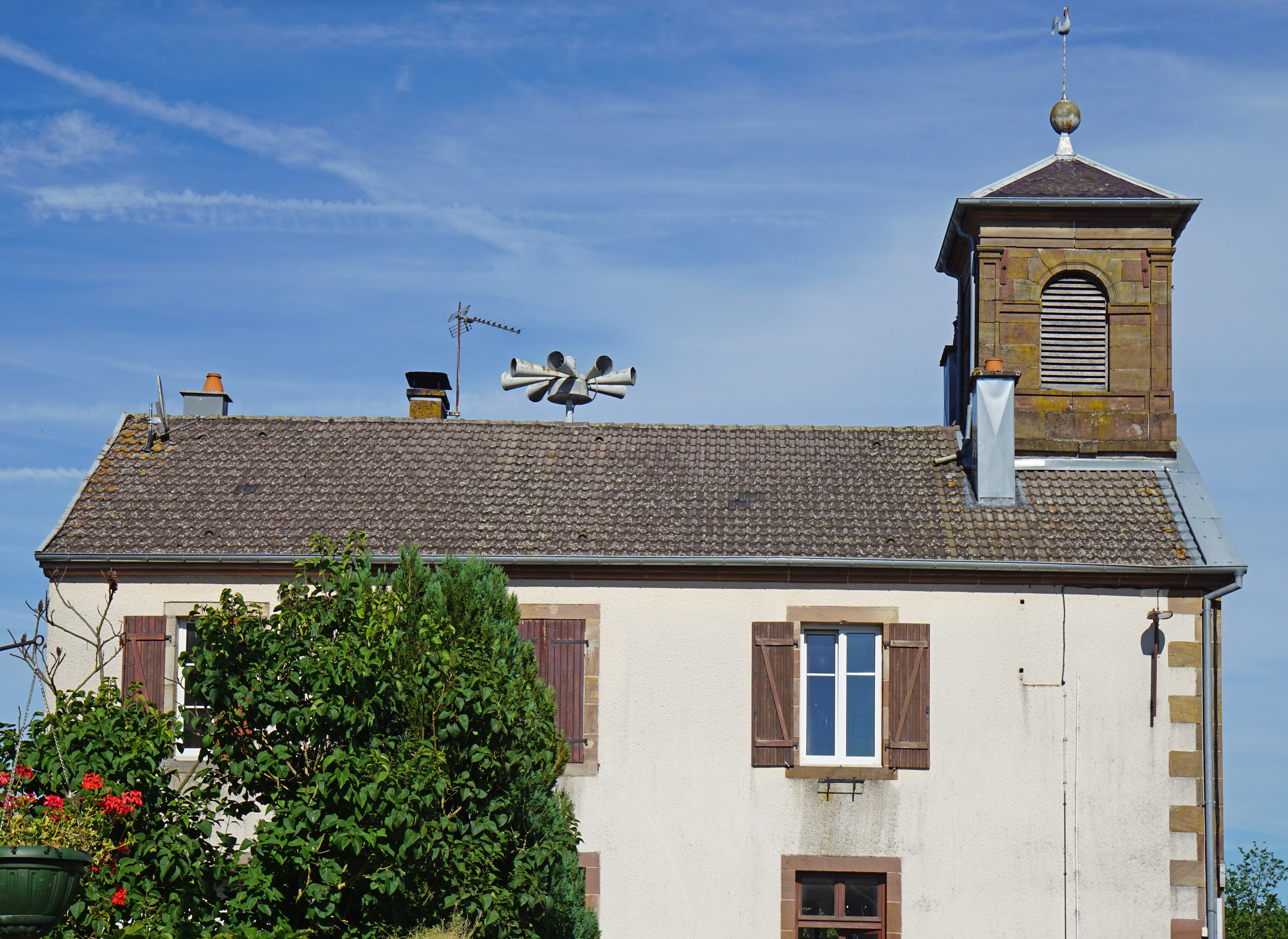
- The town hall in Ormoiche
- Location of Ormoiche
- Location within France Location within Bourgogne-Franche-Comté
- Coordinates: 47°48′23″N 6°18′42″E
- Country: France
- Region: Bourgogne-Franche-Comté
- Department: Haute-Saône
- Arrondissement: Lure
- Canton: Luxeuil-les-Bains

Government
  - Mayor (2020–2026): Philippe Gérard
- Area^{1}: 5.72 km^{2} (2.21 sq mi)
- Highest elevation: 316 m (1,037 ft)
- Lowest elevation: 238 m (781 ft)
- Population (2023): 69
  - Density: 12/km^{2} (31/sq mi)
- Time zone: UTC+01:00 (CET)
  - Summer (DST): UTC+02:00 (CEST)
- INSEE/Postal code: 70398 /70300
- ^{1} French Land Register data, which excludes lakes, ponds, glaciers > 1 km^{2} (0.386 sq mi or 247 acres) and river estuaries.

Ormoiche (French pronunciation: [ɔʁmwaʃ]) is a commune in the Haute-Saône department in the region of Bourgogne-Franche-Comté in eastern France.

== See also ==
- Communes of the Haute-Saône department
