= Sainte-Marie-en-Chaux =

- Commune
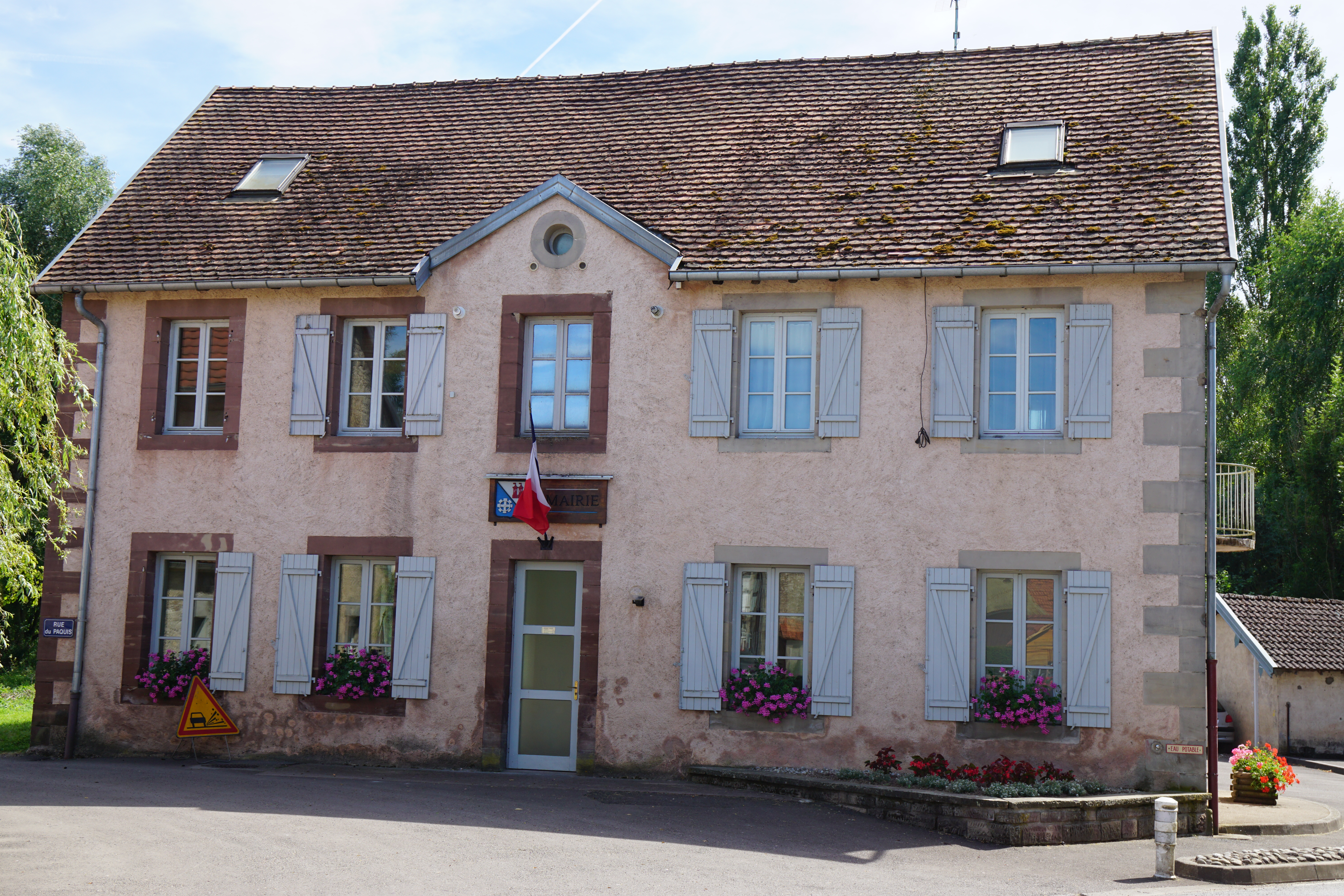
- The town hall in Sainte-Marie-en-Chaux

- Coat of arms
- Location of Sainte-Marie-en-Chaux
- Location within France Location within Bourgogne-Franche-Comté
- Coordinates: 47°47′24″N 6°18′47″E
- Country: France
- Region: Bourgogne-Franche-Comté
- Department: Haute-Saône
- Arrondissement: Lure
- Canton: Saint-Loup-sur-Semouse

Government
  - Mayor (2020–2026): Pierre Duchanois
- Area^{1}: 2.43 km^{2} (0.94 sq mi)
- Highest elevation: 287 m (942 ft)
- Lowest elevation: 247 m (810 ft)
- Population (2023): 162
  - Density: 66.7/km^{2} (173/sq mi)
- Time zone: UTC+01:00 (CET)
  - Summer (DST): UTC+02:00 (CEST)
- INSEE/Postal code: 70470 /70300
- ^{1} French Land Register data, which excludes lakes, ponds, glaciers > 1 km^{2} (0.386 sq mi or 247 acres) and river estuaries.

Sainte-Marie-en-Chaux (French pronunciation: [sɛ̃t maʁi ɑ̃ ʃo]) is a commune in the Haute-Saône department in the region of Bourgogne-Franche-Comté in eastern France.

== See also ==
- Communes of the Haute-Saône department
