= Conflans-sur-Lanterne =

- Commune
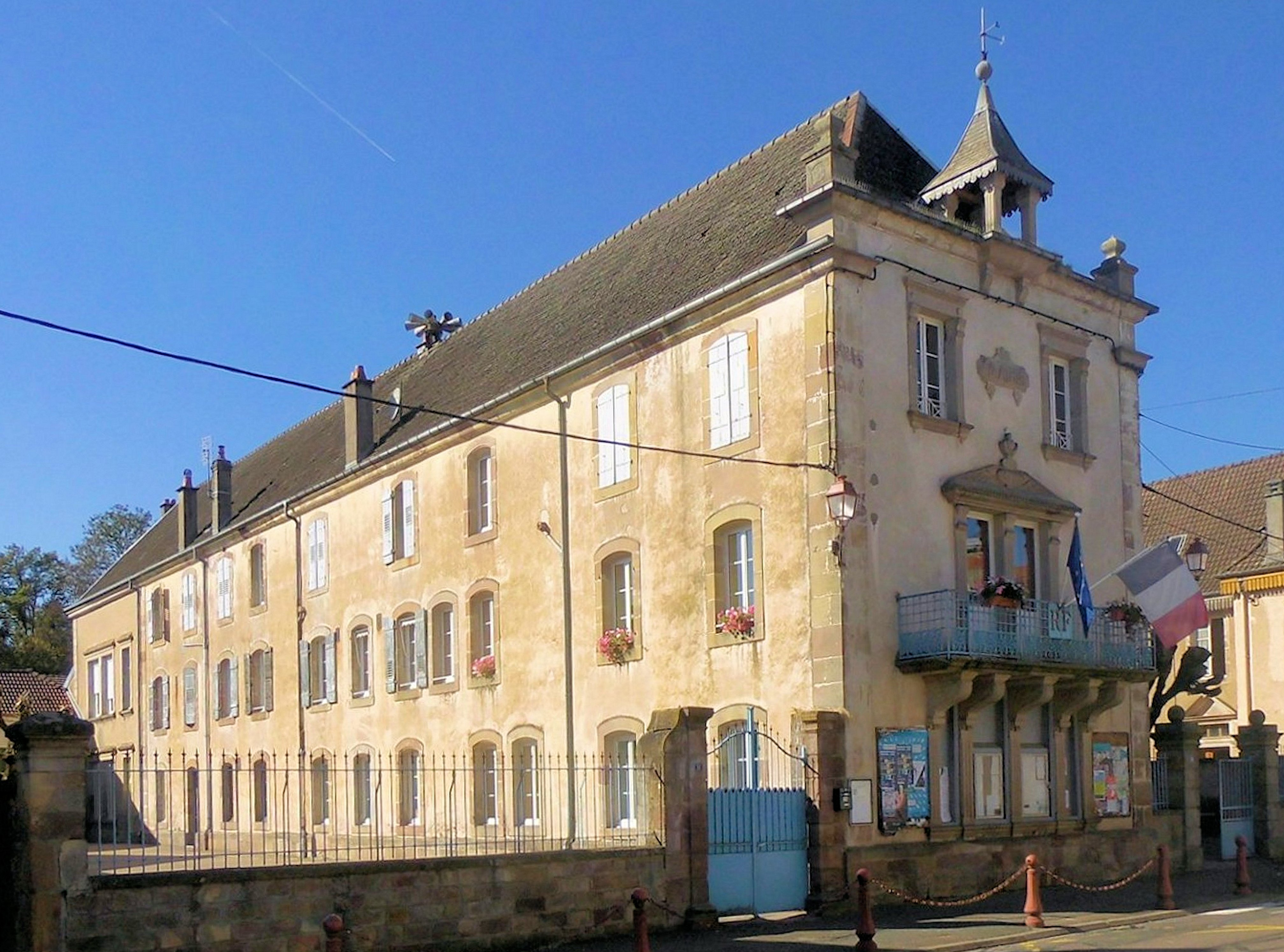
- The town hall and school in Conflans-sur-Lanterne

- Coat of arms
- Location of Conflans-sur-Lanterne
- Location within France Location within Bourgogne-Franche-Comté
- Coordinates: 47°48′57″N 6°12′38″E
- Country: France
- Region: Bourgogne-Franche-Comté
- Department: Haute-Saône
- Arrondissement: Lure
- Canton: Saint-Loup-sur-Semouse

Government
  - Mayor (2020–2026): Henri de Malliard
- Area^{1}: 13.09 km^{2} (5.05 sq mi)
- Highest elevation: 298 m (978 ft)
- Lowest elevation: 223 m (732 ft)
- Population (2023): 564
  - Density: 43.1/km^{2} (112/sq mi)
- Time zone: UTC+01:00 (CET)
  - Summer (DST): UTC+02:00 (CEST)
- INSEE/Postal code: 70168 /70800
- ^{1} French Land Register data, which excludes lakes, ponds, glaciers > 1 km^{2} (0.386 sq mi or 247 acres) and river estuaries.

Conflans-sur-Lanterne (French pronunciation: [kɔ̃flɑ̃ syʁ lɑ̃tɛʁn], lit. 'Conflans on Lanterne', before 1962: Conflans) is a commune in the Haute-Saône department in the region of Bourgogne-Franche-Comté in eastern France.

== See also ==
- Communes of the Haute-Saône department
