= Châtenois =

Châtenois may refer to:

- Châtenois, Bas-Rhin, a commune of the French region of Alsace
- Châtenois, Haute-Saône, a commune of the French region of Franche-Comté
- Châtenois, Jura, a commune of the French region of Franche-Comté
- Châtenois, Vosges, a commune of the French region of Lorraine
  - House of Châtenois, one of the other names for the House of Lorraine, who had their family castle there
- Châtenois-les-Forges, a commune of France in the Territoire de Belfort department
- Courcelles-sous-Châtenois, a commune of France in the Vosges department
- La Neuveville-sous-Châtenois, a commune of France in the Vosges department
- Longchamp-sous-Châtenois, a commune of France in the Vosges department

== See also ==
- Châtenoy (disambiguation)
