= Servigney =

- Commune
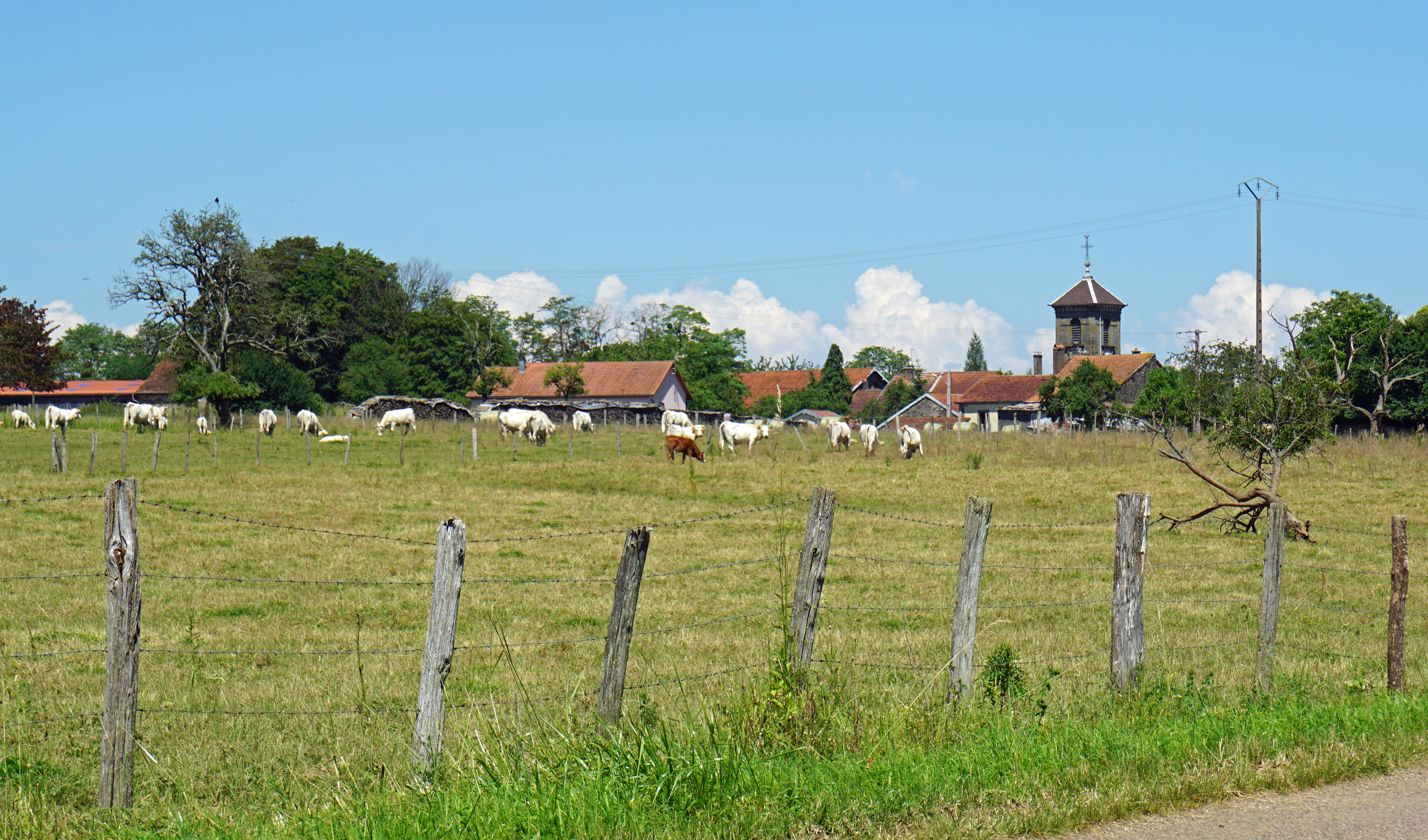
- A general view of Servigney
- Location of Servigney
- Location within France Location within Bourgogne-Franche-Comté
- Coordinates: 47°43′30″N 6°18′04″E
- Country: France
- Region: Bourgogne-Franche-Comté
- Department: Haute-Saône
- Arrondissement: Lure
- Canton: Lure-1

Government
  - Mayor (2020–2026): Marie-Pierre Dupré
- Area^{1}: 5.78 km^{2} (2.23 sq mi)
- Highest elevation: 366 m (1,201 ft)
- Lowest elevation: 262 m (860 ft)
- Population (2023): 122
  - Density: 21.1/km^{2} (54.7/sq mi)
- Time zone: UTC+01:00 (CET)
  - Summer (DST): UTC+02:00 (CEST)
- INSEE/Postal code: 70490 /70240
- ^{1} French Land Register data, which excludes lakes, ponds, glaciers > 1 km^{2} (0.386 sq mi or 247 acres) and river estuaries.

Servigney (French pronunciation: [sɛʁviɲɛ]) is a commune in the Haute-Saône department in the region of Bourgogne-Franche-Comté in eastern France.

== See also ==
- Communes of the Haute-Saône department
