= Quers =

- Commune
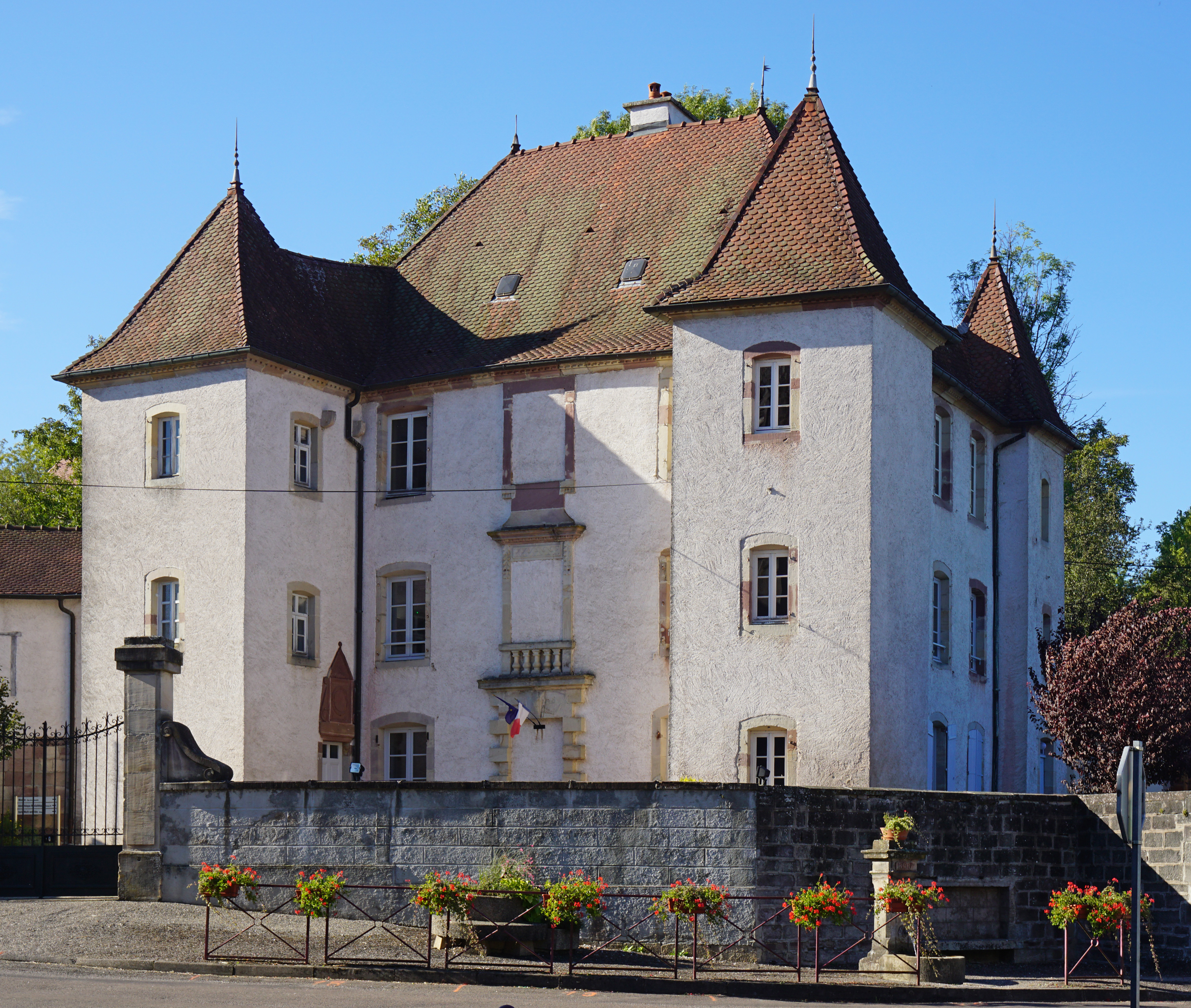
- Town hall

- Coat of arms
- Location of Quers
- Location within France Location within Bourgogne-Franche-Comté
- Coordinates: 47°44′08″N 6°25′35″E
- Country: France
- Region: Bourgogne-Franche-Comté
- Department: Haute-Saône
- Arrondissement: Lure
- Canton: Lure-1
- Area^{1}: 9.93 km^{2} (3.83 sq mi)
- Highest elevation: 339 m (1,112 ft)
- Lowest elevation: 277 m (909 ft)
- Population (2023): 340
  - Density: 34/km^{2} (89/sq mi)
- Time zone: UTC+01:00 (CET)
  - Summer (DST): UTC+02:00 (CEST)
- INSEE/Postal code: 70432 /70200
- ^{1} French Land Register data, which excludes lakes, ponds, glaciers > 1 km^{2} (0.386 sq mi or 247 acres) and river estuaries.

Quers is a commune in the Haute-Saône department in the region of Bourgogne-Franche-Comté in eastern France.

== See also ==
- Communes of the Haute-Saône department
