= Franchevelle =

Town in Bourgogne-Franche-Comté, France

- Commune
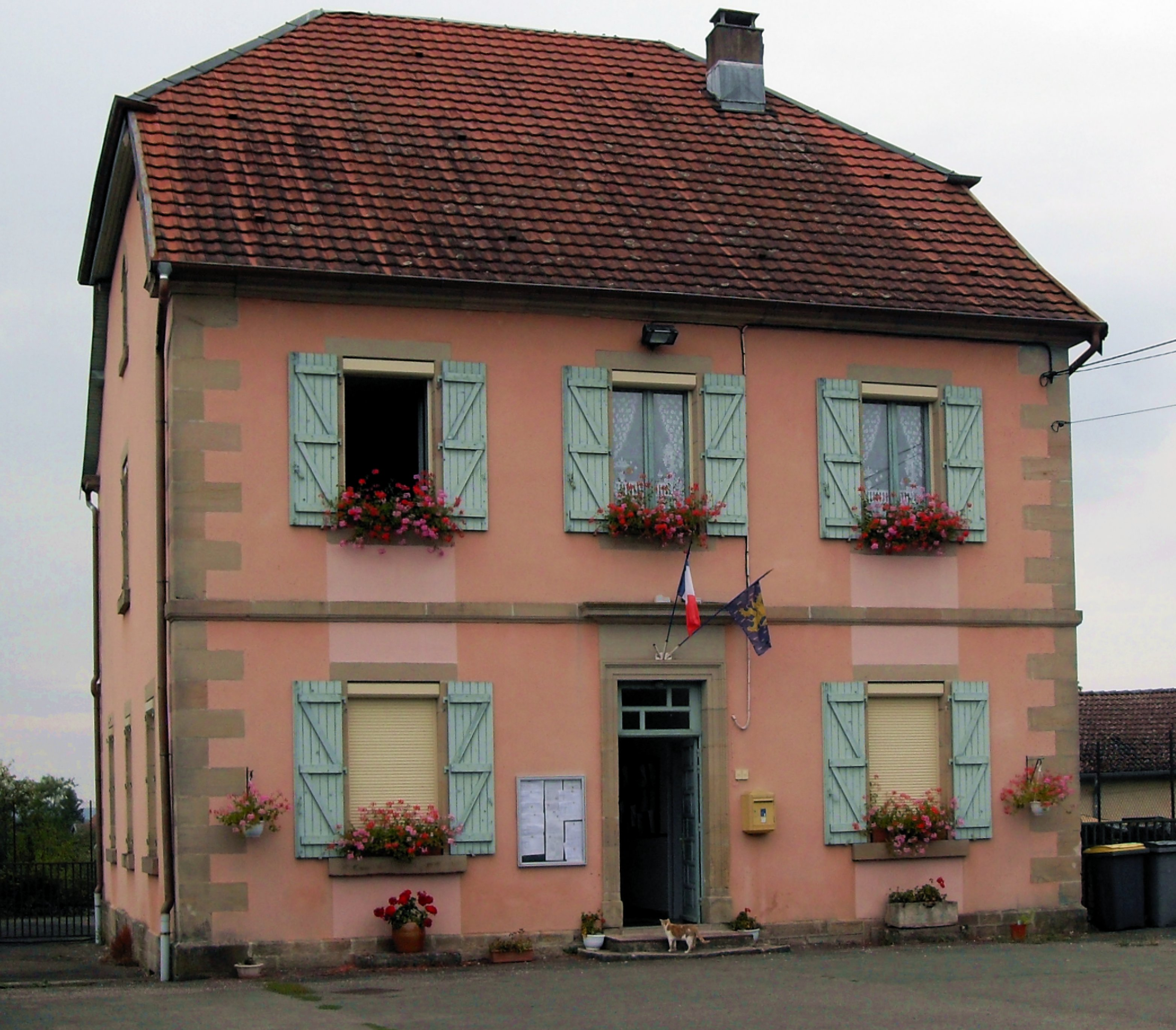
- The town hall in Franchevelle

- Coat of arms
- Location of Franchevelle
- Location within France Location within Bourgogne-Franche-Comté
- Coordinates: 47°44′28″N 6°27′42″E
- Country: France
- Region: Bourgogne-Franche-Comté
- Department: Haute-Saône
- Arrondissement: Lure
- Canton: Lure-1

Government
  - Mayor (2020–2026): Raymond Bilquez
- Area^{1}: 10.42 km^{2} (4.02 sq mi)
- Highest elevation: 350 m (1,150 ft)
- Lowest elevation: 283 m (928 ft)
- Population (2023): 491
  - Density: 47.1/km^{2} (122/sq mi)
- Time zone: UTC+01:00 (CET)
  - Summer (DST): UTC+02:00 (CEST)
- INSEE/Postal code: 70250 /70200
- ^{1} French Land Register data, which excludes lakes, ponds, glaciers > 1 km^{2} (0.386 sq mi or 247 acres) and river estuaries.

Franchevelle (French pronunciation: [fʁɑ̃ʃvɛl]) is a commune in the Haute-Saône department in the region of Bourgogne-Franche-Comté in eastern France.

== See also ==
- Communes of the Haute-Saône department
