= Dambenoît-lès-Colombe =

- Commune
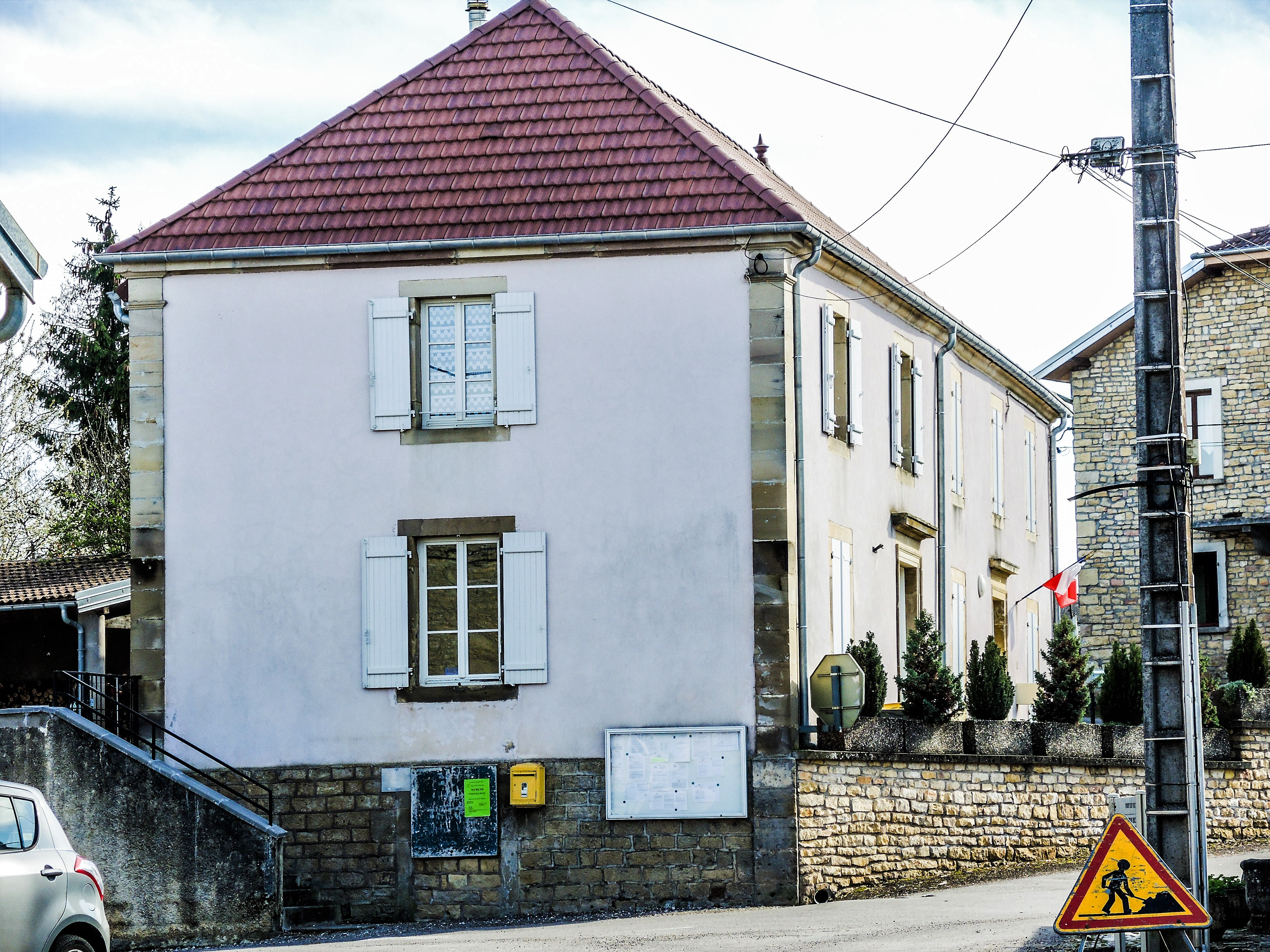
- The town hall in Dambenoît-lès-Colombe

- Coat of arms
- Location of Dambenoît-lès-Colombe
- Location within France Location within Bourgogne-Franche-Comté
- Coordinates: 47°43′24″N 6°23′09″E
- Country: France
- Region: Bourgogne-Franche-Comté
- Department: Haute-Saône
- Arrondissement: Lure
- Canton: Lure-1

Government
  - Mayor (2020–2026): François-Régis Grandvoinet
- Area^{1}: 8.69 km^{2} (3.36 sq mi)
- Highest elevation: 448 m (1,470 ft)
- Lowest elevation: 303 m (994 ft)
- Population (2023): 272
  - Density: 31.3/km^{2} (81.1/sq mi)
- Time zone: UTC+01:00 (CET)
  - Summer (DST): UTC+02:00 (CEST)
- INSEE/Postal code: 70195 /70200
- ^{1} French Land Register data, which excludes lakes, ponds, glaciers > 1 km^{2} (0.386 sq mi or 247 acres) and river estuaries.

Dambenoît-lès-Colombe (French pronunciation: [dɑ̃b(ə)nwa lɛ kɔlɔ̃b]) is a commune in the Haute-Saône department in the region of Bourgogne-Franche-Comté in eastern France. It was created in 1973 by the merger of the former communes Colombe-lès-Bithaine and Dambenoît.

== See also ==
- Communes of the Haute-Saône department
