= Châteney =

- Commune
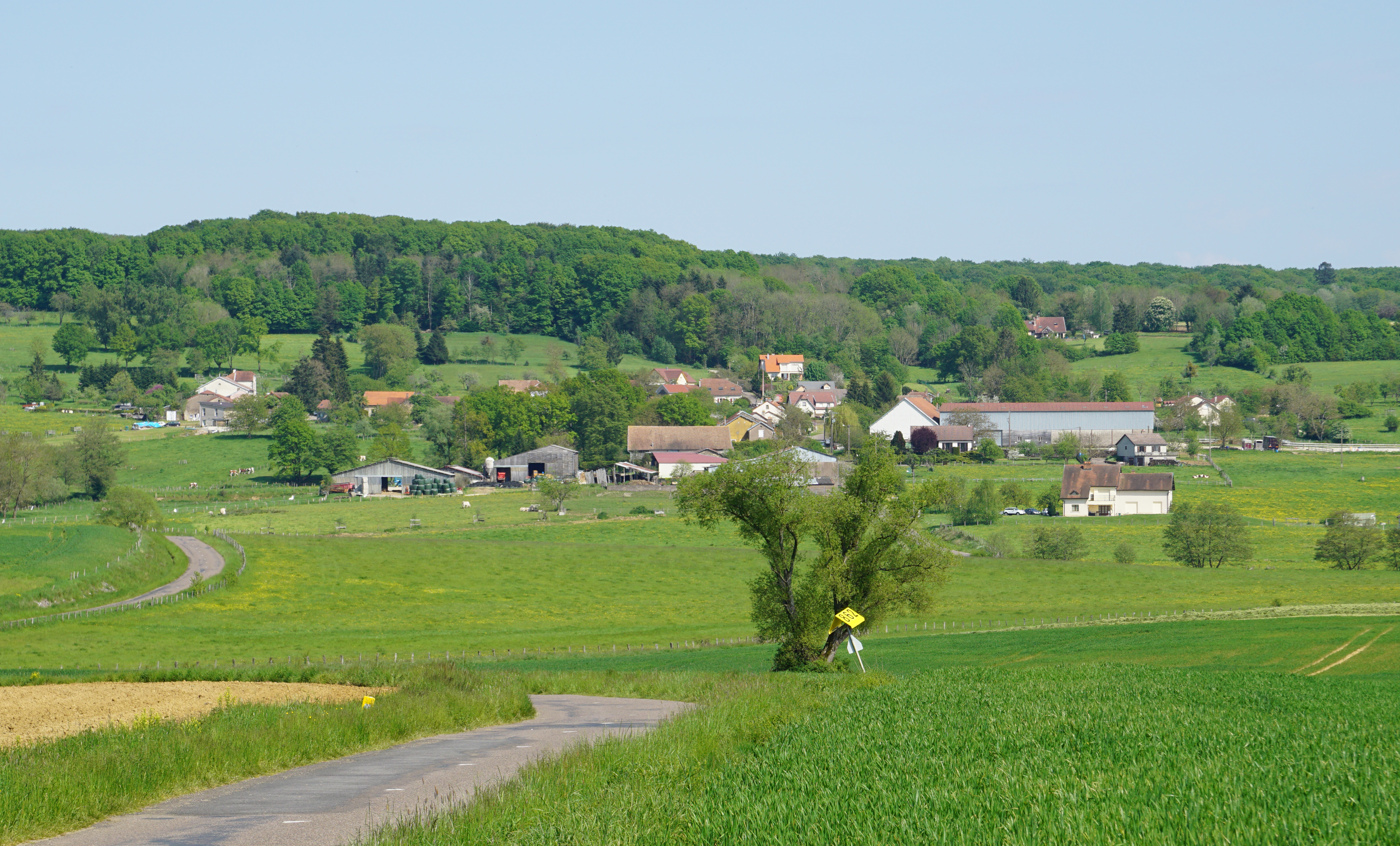
- A general view of Châteney

- Coat of arms
- Location of Châteney
- Location within France Location within Bourgogne-Franche-Comté
- Coordinates: 47°41′34″N 6°18′52″E
- Country: France
- Region: Bourgogne-Franche-Comté
- Department: Haute-Saône
- Arrondissement: Lure
- Canton: Lure-1

Government
  - Mayor (2020–2026): Michèle Jacques
- Area^{1}: 2.60 km^{2} (1.00 sq mi)
- Highest elevation: 414 m (1,358 ft)
- Lowest elevation: 287 m (942 ft)
- Population (2023): 60
  - Density: 23/km^{2} (60/sq mi)
- Time zone: UTC+01:00 (CET)
  - Summer (DST): UTC+02:00 (CEST)
- INSEE/Postal code: 70140 /70240
- ^{1} French Land Register data, which excludes lakes, ponds, glaciers > 1 km^{2} (0.386 sq mi or 247 acres) and river estuaries.

Châteney (French pronunciation: [ʃatnɛ]) is a commune in the Haute-Saône department in the region of Bourgogne-Franche-Comté in eastern France.

== See also ==
- Communes of the Haute-Saône department
