= Canton of Lure-1 =

Canton of France

Coordinates: 47.69°N 6.49°E

The canton of Lure-1 is an administrative division of the Haute-Saône department, northeastern France. It was created at the French canton reorganisation which came into effect in March 2015. Its seat is in Lure.

It consists of the following communes:

1. Adelans-et-le-Val-de-Bithaine
2. Betoncourt-lès-Brotte
3. Bouhans-lès-Lure
4. Châteney
5. Châtenois
6. La Creuse
7. Creveney
8. Dambenoît-lès-Colombe
9. Franchevelle
10. Froideterre
11. Genevrey
12. Linexert
13. Lure (partly)
14. Malbouhans
15. La Neuvelle-lès-Lure
16. Quers
17. Ronchamp
18. Saint-Germain
19. Saulx
20. Servigney
21. Velleminfroy
