= Châtenoy =

Châtenoy may refer to:

- Châtenoy, a commune of the Loiret department, in France
- Châtenoy, a commune of the Seine-et-Marne department, in France

== See also ==
- Châtenois (disambiguation)
