= La Creuse =

- Commune
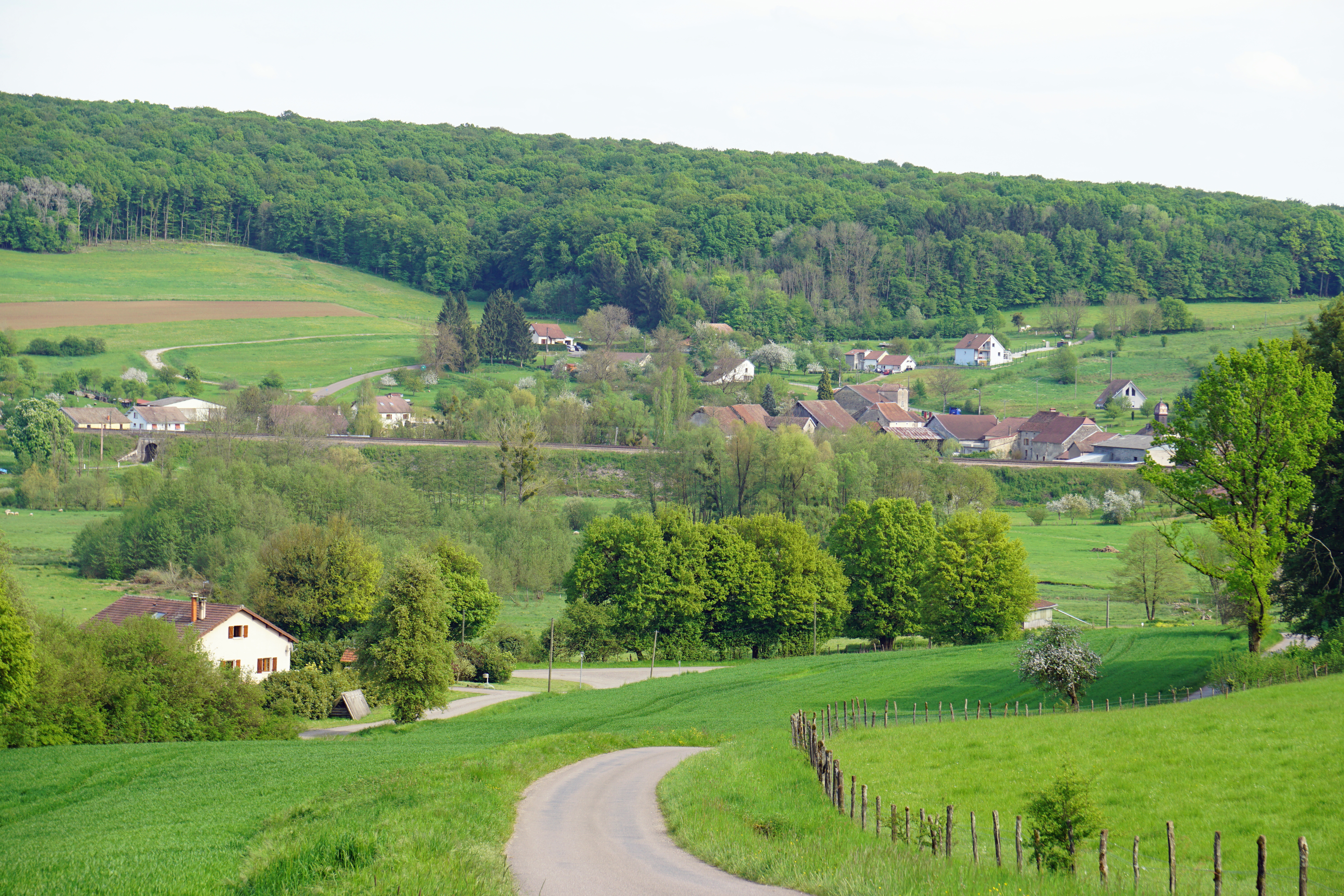
- A general view of La Creuse

- Coat of arms
- Location of La Creuse
- Location within France Location within Bourgogne-Franche-Comté
- Coordinates: 47°40′34″N 6°20′51″E
- Country: France
- Region: Bourgogne-Franche-Comté
- Department: Haute-Saône
- Arrondissement: Lure
- Canton: Lure-1

Government
  - Mayor (2020–2026): Francis Thomas
- Area^{1}: 5.04 km^{2} (1.95 sq mi)
- Highest elevation: 412 m (1,352 ft)
- Lowest elevation: 284 m (932 ft)
- Population (2023): 73
  - Density: 14/km^{2} (38/sq mi)
- Time zone: UTC+01:00 (CET)
  - Summer (DST): UTC+02:00 (CEST)
- INSEE/Postal code: 70186 /70240
- ^{1} French Land Register data, which excludes lakes, ponds, glaciers > 1 km^{2} (0.386 sq mi or 247 acres) and river estuaries.

La Creuse (French pronunciation: [la kʁøz]) is a commune in the Haute-Saône department in the region of Bourgogne-Franche-Comté in eastern France.

== See also ==
- Communes of the Haute-Saône department
