= Betoncourt-lès-Brotte =

- Commune
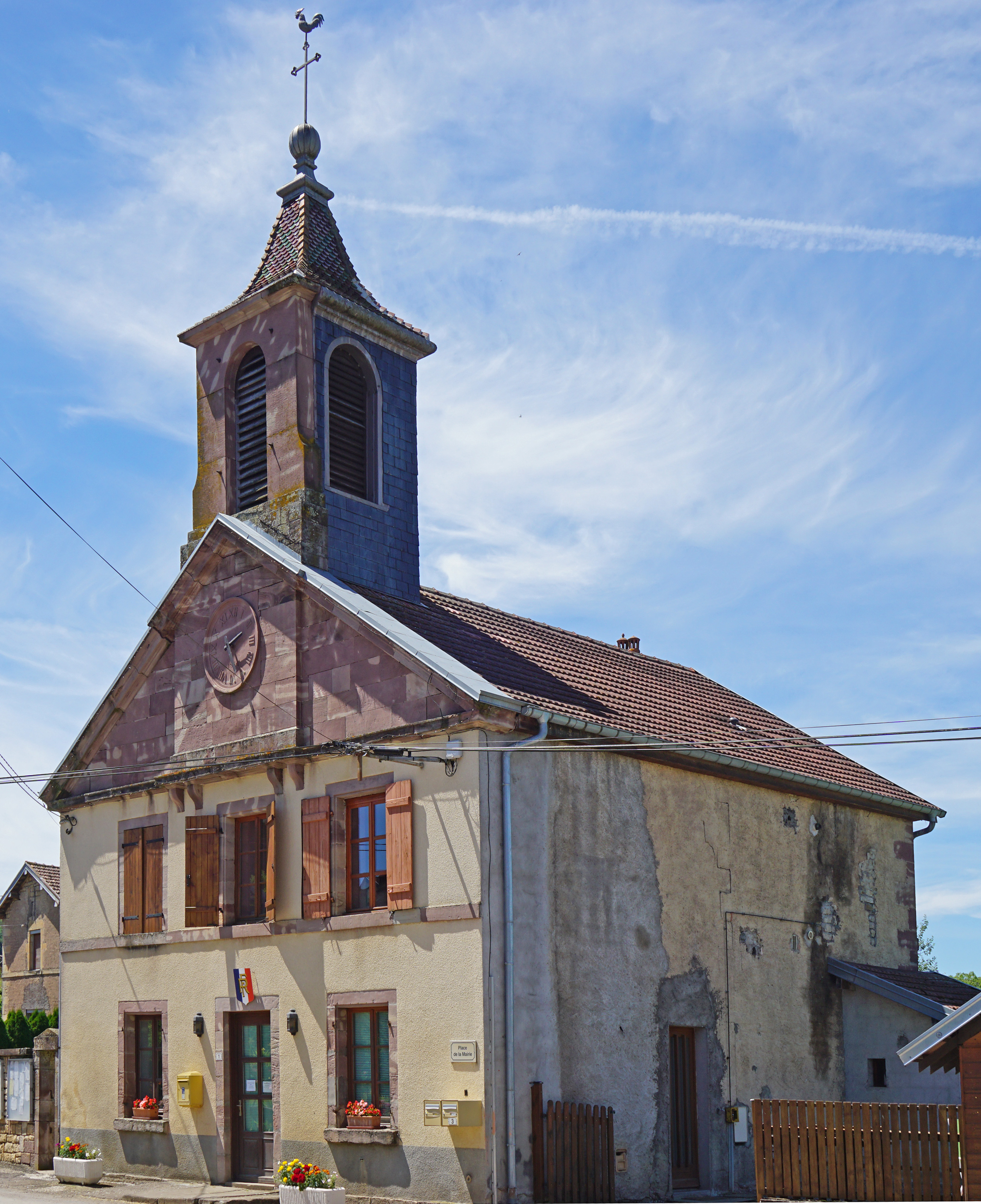
- The town hall in Betoncourt-lès-Brotte

- Coat of arms
- Location of Betoncourt-lès-Brotte
- Location within France Location within Bourgogne-Franche-Comté
- Coordinates: 47°44′32″N 6°20′34″E
- Country: France
- Region: Bourgogne-Franche-Comté
- Department: Haute-Saône
- Arrondissement: Lure
- Canton: Lure-1

Government
  - Mayor (2023–2026): Arnaud Cholley
- Area^{1}: 3.07 km^{2} (1.19 sq mi)
- Highest elevation: 437 m (1,434 ft)
- Lowest elevation: 272 m (892 ft)
- Population (2023): 113
  - Density: 36.8/km^{2} (95.3/sq mi)
- Time zone: UTC+01:00 (CET)
  - Summer (DST): UTC+02:00 (CEST)
- INSEE/Postal code: 70067 /70300
- ^{1} French Land Register data, which excludes lakes, ponds, glaciers > 1 km^{2} (0.386 sq mi or 247 acres) and river estuaries.

Betoncourt-lès-Brotte is a commune in the Haute-Saône department in the region of Bourgogne-Franche-Comté in eastern France.

== See also ==
- Communes of the Haute-Saône department
