= Velleminfroy =

- Commune
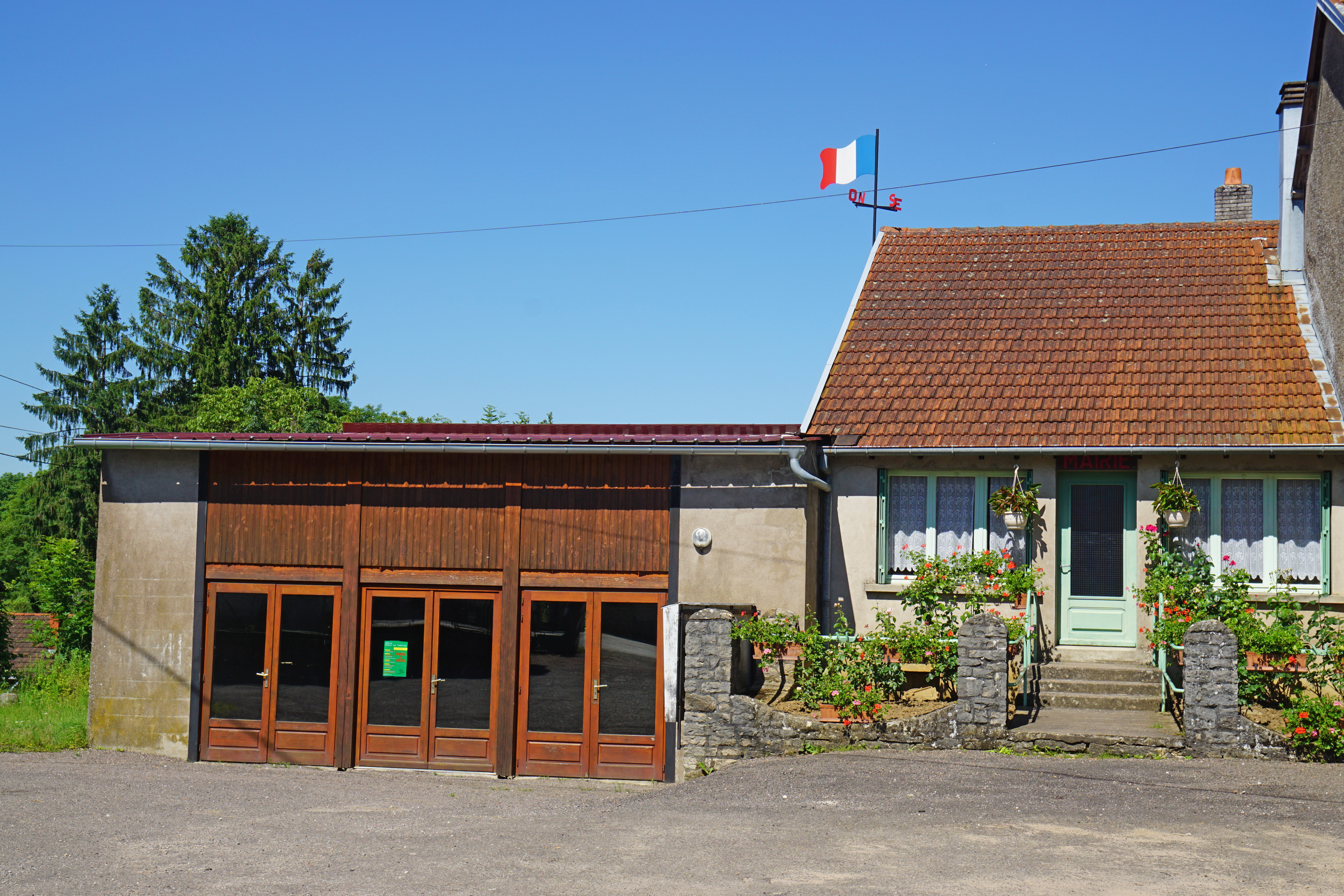
- The town hall in Velleminfroy
- Location of Velleminfroy
- Location within France Location within Bourgogne-Franche-Comté
- Coordinates: 47°39′47″N 6°19′07″E
- Country: France
- Region: Bourgogne-Franche-Comté
- Department: Haute-Saône
- Arrondissement: Lure
- Canton: Lure-1
- Area^{1}: 6.02 km^{2} (2.32 sq mi)
- Highest elevation: 379 m (1,243 ft)
- Lowest elevation: 278 m (912 ft)
- Population (2023): 294
  - Density: 48.8/km^{2} (126/sq mi)
- Time zone: UTC+01:00 (CET)
  - Summer (DST): UTC+02:00 (CEST)
- INSEE/Postal code: 70537 /70240
- ^{1} French Land Register data, which excludes lakes, ponds, glaciers > 1 km^{2} (0.386 sq mi or 247 acres) and river estuaries.

Velleminfroy is a commune in the Haute-Saône department in the region of Bourgogne-Franche-Comté in eastern France.

== See also ==
- Communes of the Haute-Saône department
