= Adelans-et-le-Val-de-Bithaine =

- Commune
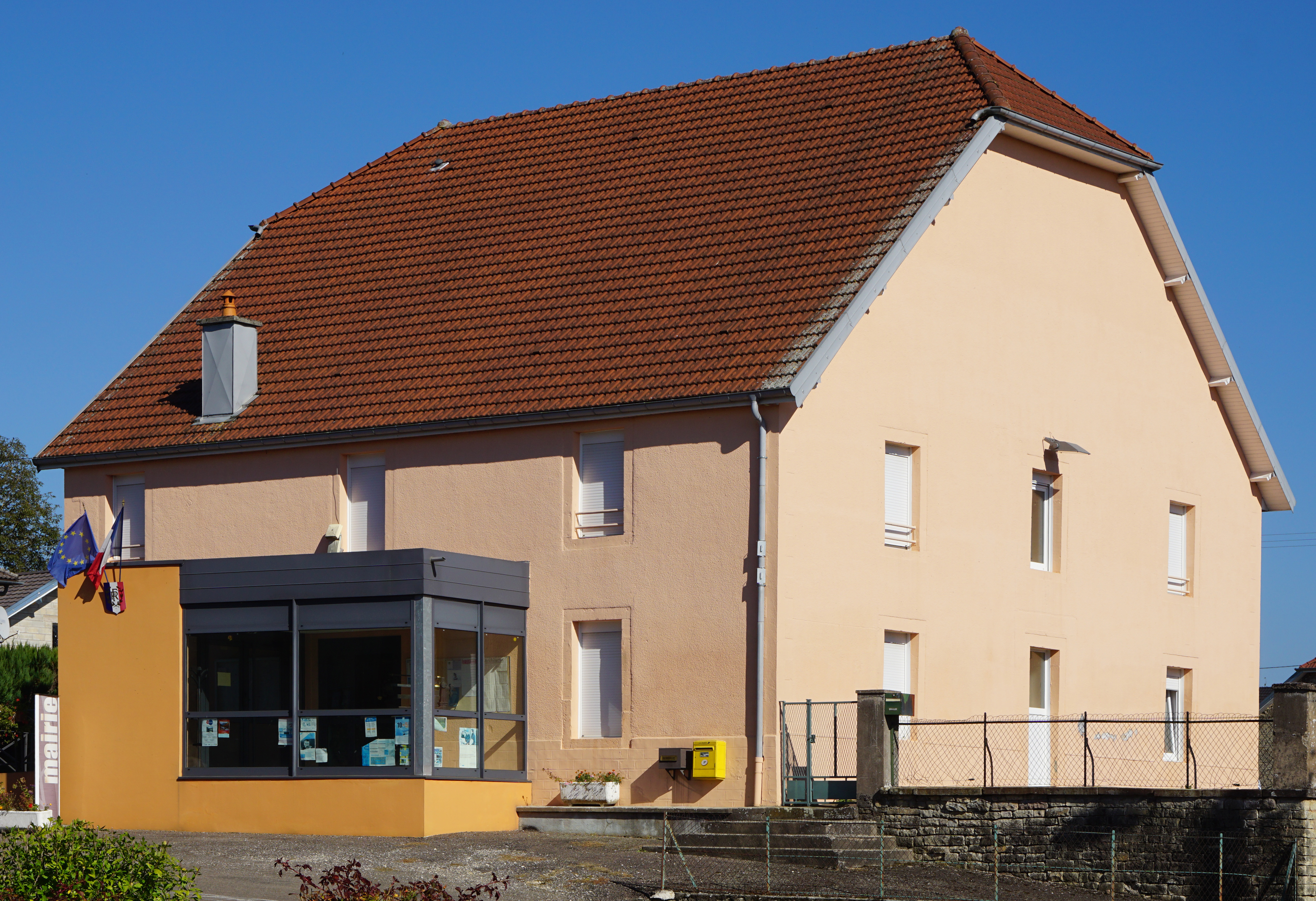
- The town hall in Adelans-et-le-Val-de-Bithaine

- Coat of arms
- Location of Adelans-et-le-Val-de-Bithaine
- Location within France Location within Bourgogne-Franche-Comté
- Coordinates: 47°42′36″N 6°23′55″E
- Country: France
- Region: Bourgogne-Franche-Comté
- Department: Haute-Saône
- Arrondissement: Lure
- Canton: Lure-1
- Intercommunality: Triangle Vert

Government
  - Mayor (2020–2026): Jean-Marie Bringout
- Area^{1}: 17.30 km^{2} (6.68 sq mi)
- Highest elevation: 445 m (1,460 ft)
- Lowest elevation: 292 m (958 ft)
- Population (2023): 311
  - Density: 18.0/km^{2} (46.6/sq mi)
- Time zone: UTC+01:00 (CET)
  - Summer (DST): UTC+02:00 (CEST)
- INSEE/Postal code: 70004 /70200
- ^{1} French Land Register data, which excludes lakes, ponds, glaciers > 1 km^{2} (0.386 sq mi or 247 acres) and river estuaries.

Adelans-et-le-Val-de-Bithaine (French pronunciation: [adlɑ̃ e lə val də bitɛn]) is a commune in the Haute-Saône department in the region of Bourgogne-Franche-Comté in eastern France.

== Population ==
Historical population
Year	Pop.	±% p.a.
1968	200	—
1975	183	−1.26%
1982	219	+2.60%
1990	285	+3.35%
1999	251	−1.40%
2007	316	+2.92%
2012	304	−0.77%
2017	301	−0.20%
2023	311	+0.55%
Source: INSEE

== See also ==
- Communes of the Haute-Saône department
