= Bouhans-lès-Lure =

- Commune
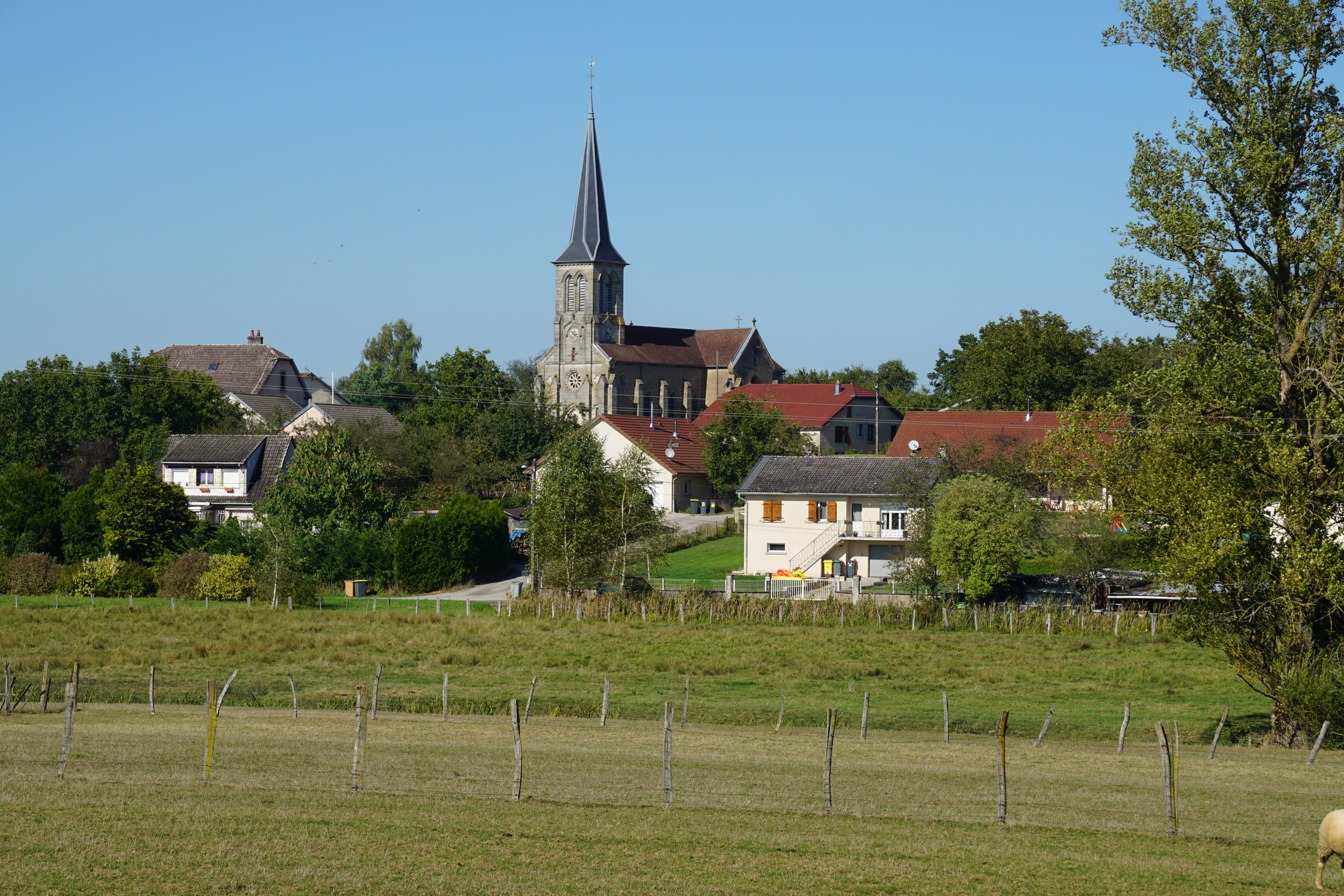
- A general view of Bouhans-lès-Lure

- Coat of arms
- Location of Bouhans-lès-Lure
- Location within France Location within Bourgogne-Franche-Comté
- Coordinates: 47°41′44″N 6°25′25″E
- Country: France
- Region: Bourgogne-Franche-Comté
- Department: Haute-Saône
- Arrondissement: Lure
- Canton: Lure-1

Government
  - Mayor (2020–2026): Éric Fréchin
- Area^{1}: 9.11 km^{2} (3.52 sq mi)
- Highest elevation: 385 m (1,263 ft)
- Lowest elevation: 231 m (758 ft)
- Population (2023): 267
  - Density: 29.3/km^{2} (75.9/sq mi)
- Time zone: UTC+01:00 (CET)
  - Summer (DST): UTC+02:00 (CEST)
- INSEE/Postal code: 70081 /70200
- ^{1} French Land Register data, which excludes lakes, ponds, glaciers > 1 km^{2} (0.386 sq mi or 247 acres) and river estuaries.

Bouhans-lès-Lure (French pronunciation: [bu.ɑ̃ lɛ lyʁ], literally Bouhans near Lure) is a commune in the Haute-Saône department in the region of Bourgogne-Franche-Comté in eastern France.

== See also ==
- Communes of the Haute-Saône department
