= Linexert =

- Commune
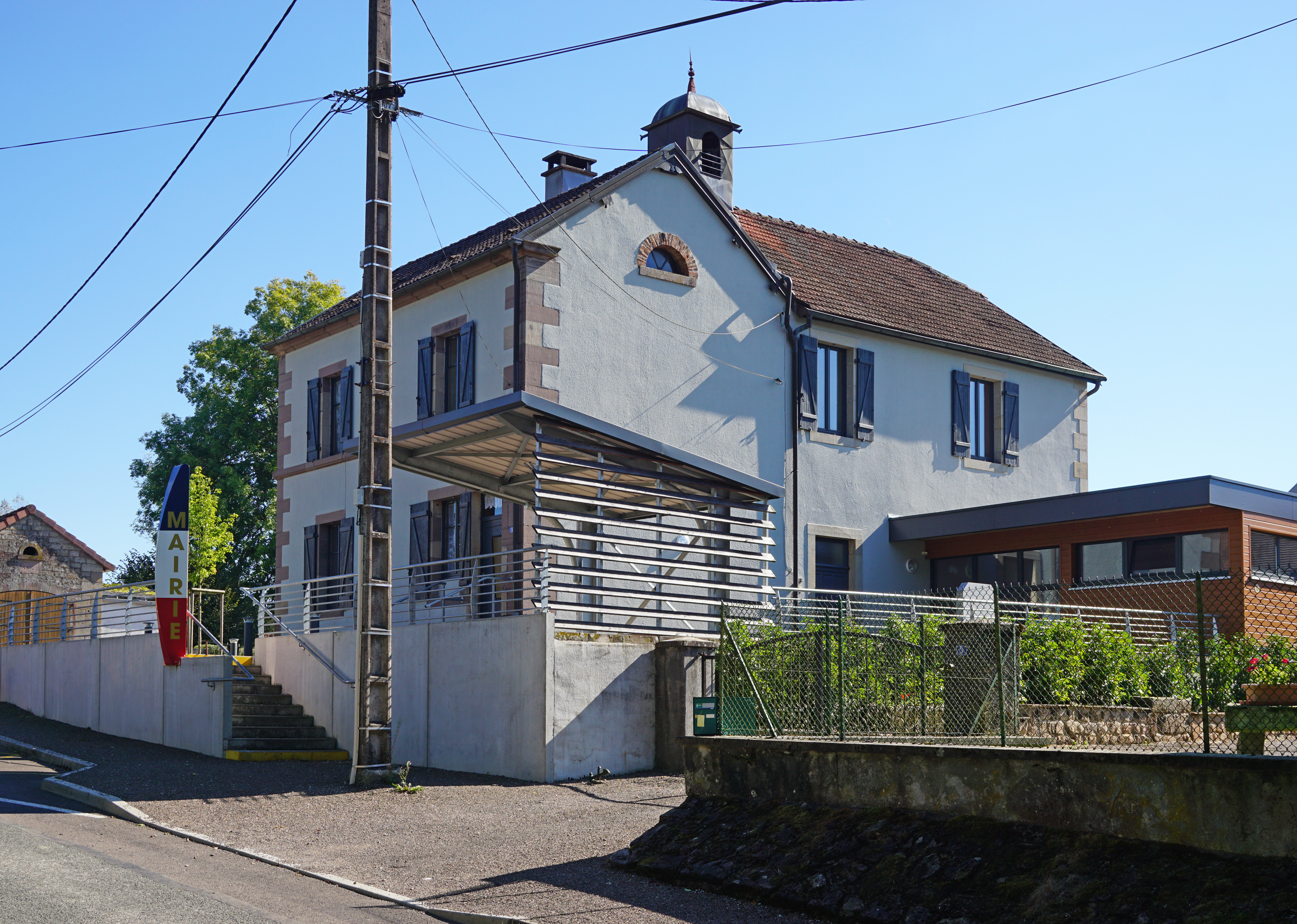
- The town hall in Linexert

- Coat of arms
- Location of Linexert
- Location within France Location within Bourgogne-Franche-Comté
- Coordinates: 47°44′39″N 6°28′59″E
- Country: France
- Region: Bourgogne-Franche-Comté
- Department: Haute-Saône
- Arrondissement: Lure
- Canton: Lure-1
- Area^{1}: 1.99 km^{2} (0.77 sq mi)
- Highest elevation: 340 m (1,120 ft)
- Lowest elevation: 301 m (988 ft)
- Population (2023): 115
  - Density: 57.8/km^{2} (150/sq mi)
- Time zone: UTC+01:00 (CET)
  - Summer (DST): UTC+02:00 (CEST)
- INSEE/Postal code: 70304 /70200
- ^{1} French Land Register data, which excludes lakes, ponds, glaciers > 1 km^{2} (0.386 sq mi or 247 acres) and river estuaries.

Linexert is a commune in the Haute-Saône department in France's Bourgogne-Franche-Comté region.

== See also ==
- Communes of the Haute-Saône department
