= Genevrey =

- Commune
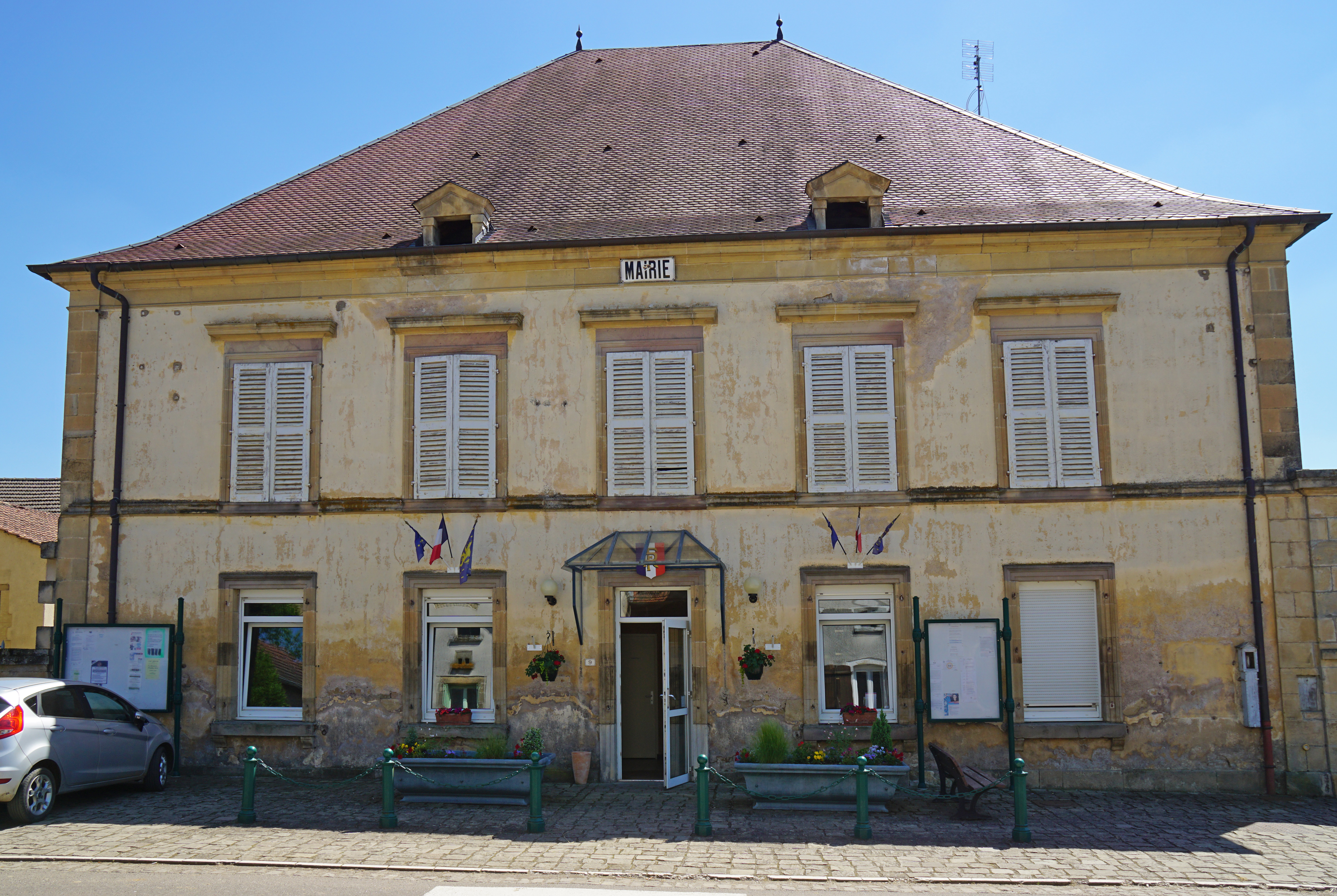
- The town hall in Genevrey
- Location of Genevrey
- Location within France Location within Bourgogne-Franche-Comté
- Coordinates: 47°43′28″N 6°19′32″E
- Country: France
- Region: Bourgogne-Franche-Comté
- Department: Haute-Saône
- Arrondissement: Lure
- Canton: Lure-1

Government
  - Mayor (2020–2026): Cyrille Froidevaux
- Area^{1}: 11.97 km^{2} (4.62 sq mi)
- Highest elevation: 453 m (1,486 ft)
- Lowest elevation: 289 m (948 ft)
- Population (2023): 247
  - Density: 20.6/km^{2} (53.4/sq mi)
- Time zone: UTC+01:00 (CET)
  - Summer (DST): UTC+02:00 (CEST)
- INSEE/Postal code: 70263 /70240
- ^{1} French Land Register data, which excludes lakes, ponds, glaciers > 1 km^{2} (0.386 sq mi or 247 acres) and river estuaries.

Genevrey (French pronunciation: [ʒənvʁɛ]) is a commune in the Haute-Saône department in the region of Bourgogne-Franche-Comté in eastern France.

== See also ==
- Communes of the Haute-Saône department
