= Aroffe =

- Commune
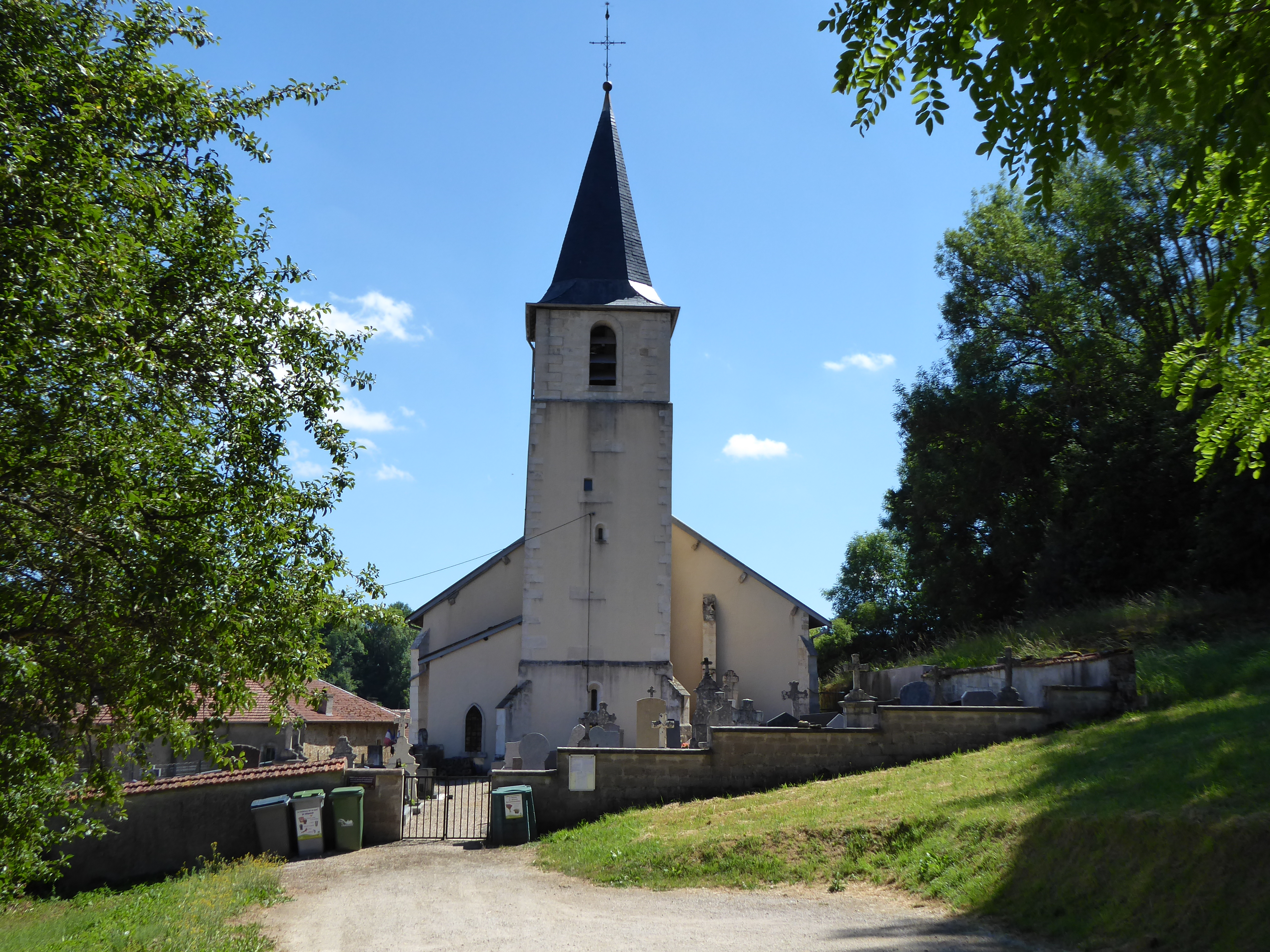
- The church in Aroffe

- Coat of arms
- Location of Aroffe
- Location within France Location within Grand Est
- Coordinates: 48°24′06″N 5°54′00″E
- Country: France
- Region: Grand Est
- Department: Vosges
- Arrondissement: Neufchâteau
- Canton: Mirecourt
- Intercommunality: CC Ouest Vosgien

Government
  - Mayor (2020–2026): Agnès Foray
- Area^{1}: 8.51 km^{2} (3.29 sq mi)
- Elevation: 370 m (1,210 ft)
- Highest elevation: 460 m (1,510 ft)
- Lowest elevation: 347 m (1,138 ft)
- Population (2023): 93
  - Density: 11/km^{2} (28/sq mi)
- Time zone: UTC+01:00 (CET)
  - Summer (DST): UTC+02:00 (CEST)
- INSEE/Postal code: 88013 /88170
- ^{1} French Land Register data, which excludes lakes, ponds, glaciers > 1 km^{2} (0.386 sq mi or 247 acres) and river estuaries.

Aroffe (French pronunciation: [aʁɔf]) is a commune in the Vosges department in Grand Est in northeastern France.

== See also ==
- Communes of the Vosges department
