= Froideterre =

- Commune
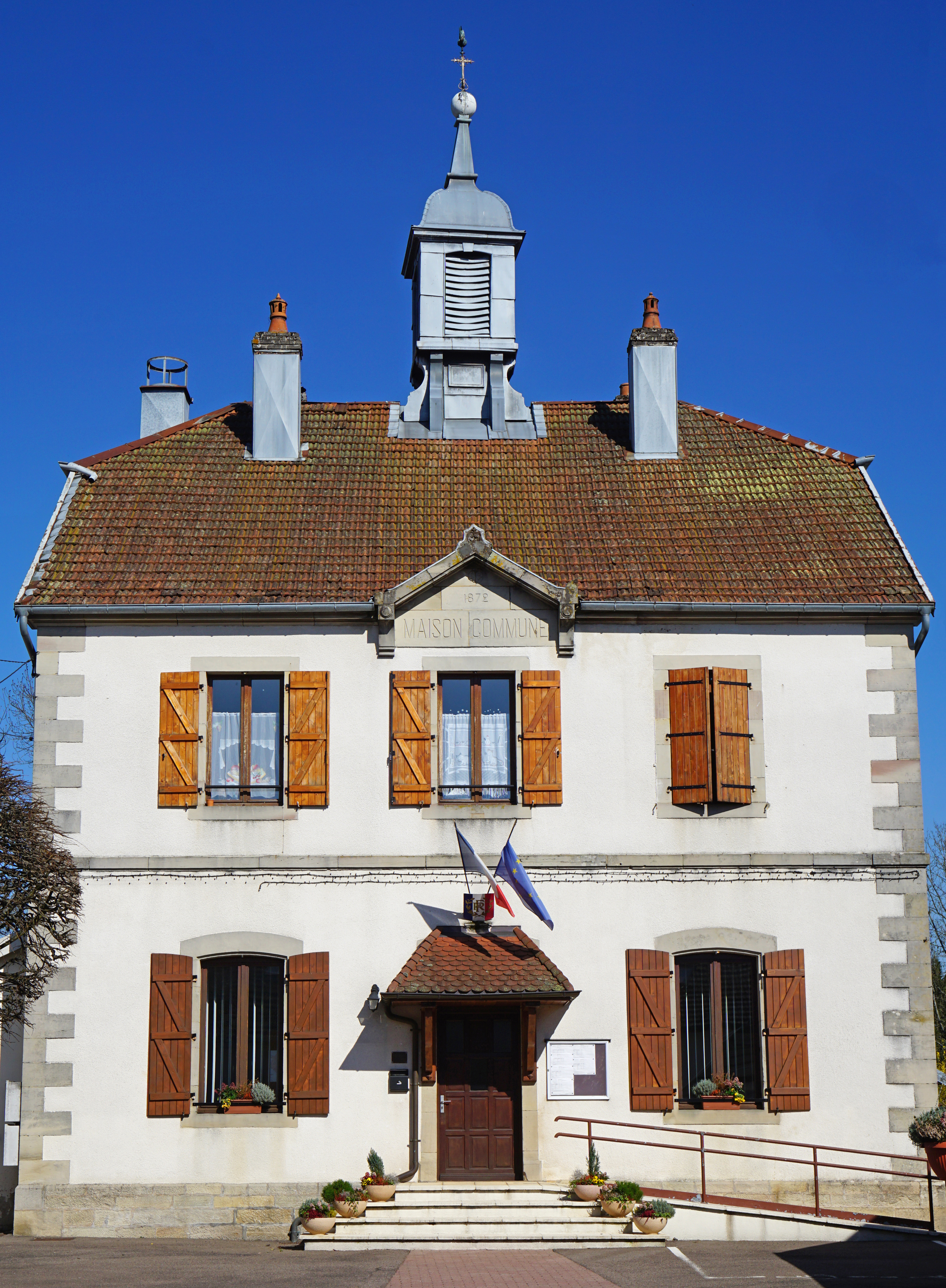
- The town hall in Froideterre
- Location of Froideterre
- Location within France Location within Bourgogne-Franche-Comté
- Coordinates: 47°42′28″N 6°31′58″E
- Country: France
- Region: Bourgogne-Franche-Comté
- Department: Haute-Saône
- Arrondissement: Lure
- Canton: Lure-1

Government
  - Mayor (2020–2026): Sylvie Mourey
- Area^{1}: 2.83 km^{2} (1.09 sq mi)
- Highest elevation: 337 m (1,106 ft)
- Lowest elevation: 299 m (981 ft)
- Population (2023): 359
  - Density: 127/km^{2} (329/sq mi)
- Time zone: UTC+01:00 (CET)
  - Summer (DST): UTC+02:00 (CEST)
- INSEE/Postal code: 70259 /70200
- ^{1} French Land Register data, which excludes lakes, ponds, glaciers > 1 km^{2} (0.386 sq mi or 247 acres) and river estuaries.

Froideterre (French pronunciation: [fʁwadtɛʁ]) is a commune in the Haute-Saône department in the region of Bourgogne-Franche-Comté in eastern France.

== See also ==
- Communes of the Haute-Saône department
