= La Neuvelle-lès-Lure =

- Commune
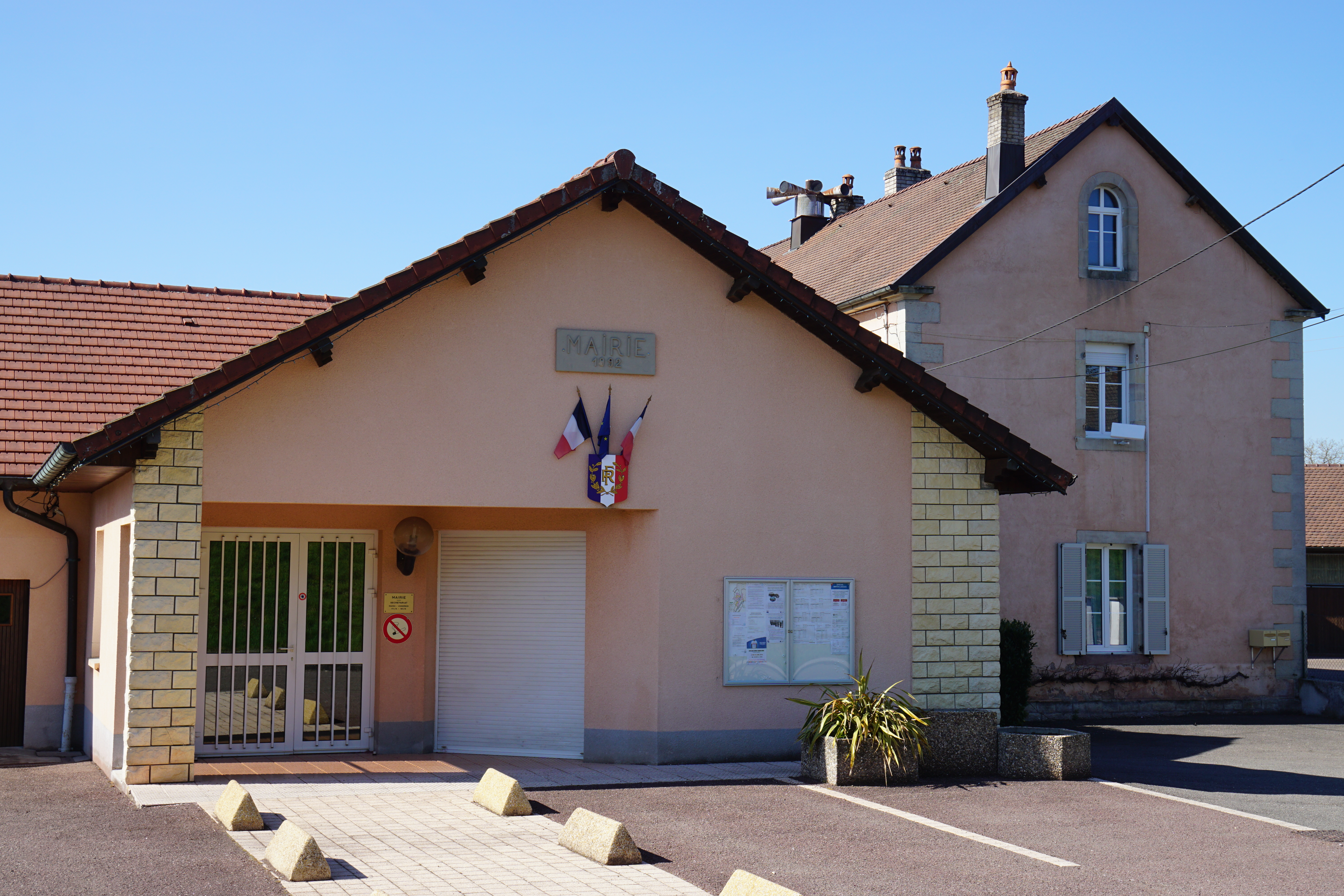
- The town hall in La Neuvelle-lès-Lure

- Coat of arms
- Location of La Neuvelle-lès-Lure
- Location within France Location within Bourgogne-Franche-Comté
- Coordinates: 47°43′09″N 6°33′20″E
- Country: France
- Region: Bourgogne-Franche-Comté
- Department: Haute-Saône
- Arrondissement: Lure
- Canton: Lure-1

Government
  - Mayor (2020–2026): Dominique Laffage
- Area^{1}: 4.88 km^{2} (1.88 sq mi)
- Highest elevation: 336 m (1,102 ft)
- Lowest elevation: 300 m (980 ft)
- Population (2023): 302
  - Density: 61.9/km^{2} (160/sq mi)
- Time zone: UTC+01:00 (CET)
  - Summer (DST): UTC+02:00 (CEST)
- INSEE/Postal code: 70385 /70200
- ^{1} French Land Register data, which excludes lakes, ponds, glaciers > 1 km^{2} (0.386 sq mi or 247 acres) and river estuaries.

La Neuvelle-lès-Lure (French pronunciation: [la nøvɛl lɛ lyʁ], literally La Neuvelle near Lure) is a commune in the Haute-Saône department in the region of Bourgogne-Franche-Comté in eastern France.

== See also ==
- Communes of the Haute-Saône department
