= Malbouhans =

- Commune
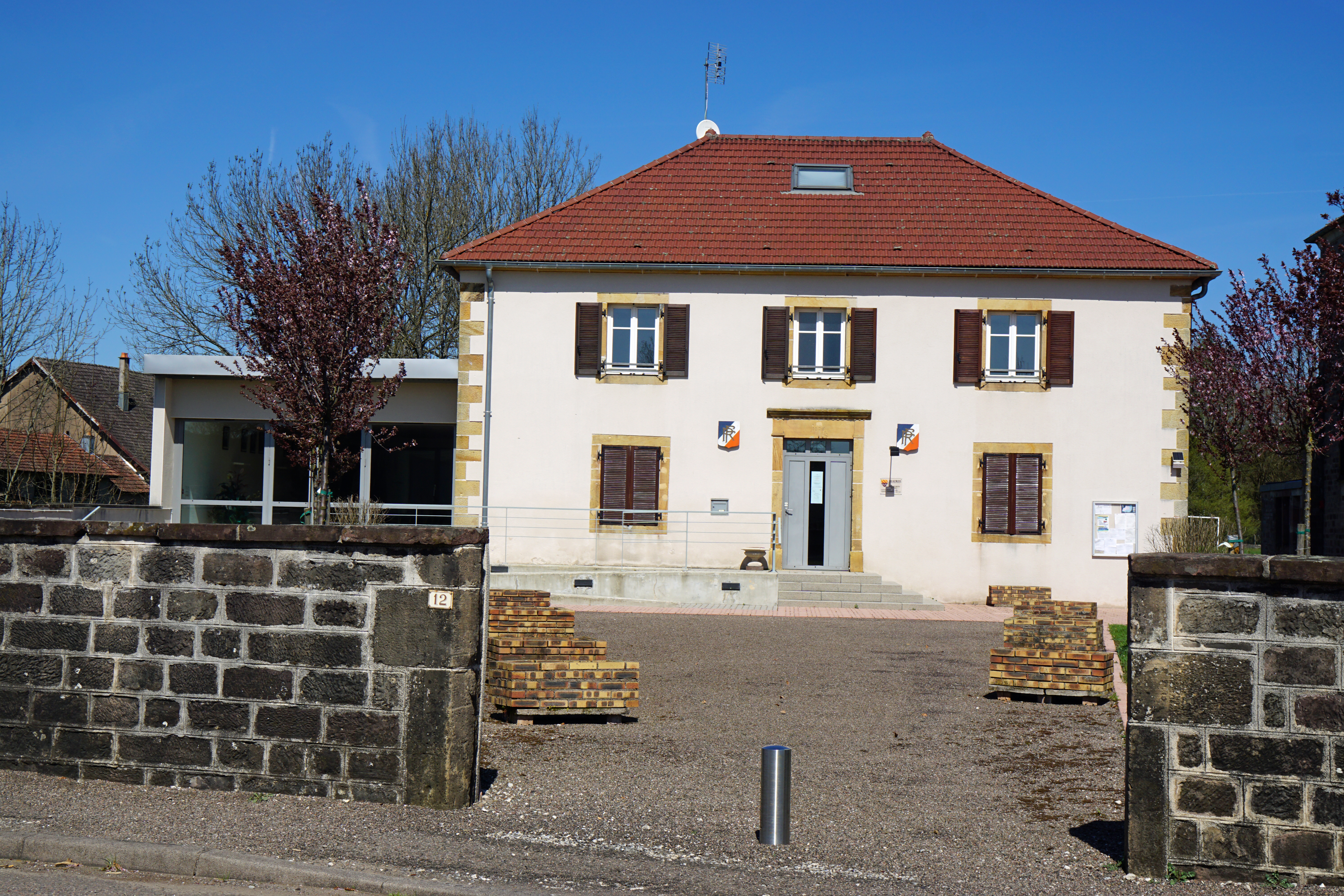
- The town hall in Malbouhans

- Coat of arms
- Location of Malbouhans
- Location within France Location within Bourgogne-Franche-Comté
- Coordinates: 47°42′45″N 6°34′51″E
- Country: France
- Region: Bourgogne-Franche-Comté
- Department: Haute-Saône
- Arrondissement: Lure
- Canton: Lure-1

Government
  - Mayor (2020–2026): Sylvain Masson
- Area^{1}: 7.80 km^{2} (3.01 sq mi)
- Highest elevation: 517 m (1,696 ft)
- Lowest elevation: 310 m (1,020 ft)
- Population (2023): 337
  - Density: 43.2/km^{2} (112/sq mi)
- Time zone: UTC+01:00 (CET)
  - Summer (DST): UTC+02:00 (CEST)
- INSEE/Postal code: 70328 /70200
- ^{1} French Land Register data, which excludes lakes, ponds, glaciers > 1 km^{2} (0.386 sq mi or 247 acres) and river estuaries.

Malbouhans (French pronunciation: [malbu.ɑ̃]) is a commune in the Haute-Saône department in the region of Bourgogne-Franche-Comté in eastern France.

== See also ==
- Communes of the Haute-Saône department
