= Courcelles-sous-Châtenois =

- Commune
- Location of Courcelles-sous-Châtenois
- Location within France Location within Grand Est
- Coordinates: 48°19′41″N 5°48′59″E
- Country: France
- Region: Grand Est
- Department: Vosges
- Arrondissement: Neufchâteau
- Canton: Mirecourt
- Intercommunality: CC l'Ouest Vosgien

Government
  - Mayor (2020–2026): Michel Humblot
- Area^{1}: 2.33 km^{2} (0.90 sq mi)
- Elevation: 360 m (1,180 ft)
- Highest elevation: 471 m (1,545 ft)
- Lowest elevation: 334 m (1,096 ft)
- Population (2023): 74
  - Density: 32/km^{2} (82/sq mi)
- Time zone: UTC+01:00 (CET)
  - Summer (DST): UTC+02:00 (CEST)
- INSEE/Postal code: 88117 /88170
- ^{1} French Land Register data, which excludes lakes, ponds, glaciers > 1 km^{2} (0.386 sq mi or 247 acres) and river estuaries.

Courcelles-sous-Châtenois (French pronunciation: [kuʁsɛl su ʃatnwa], literally Courcelles under Châtenois) is a commune in the Vosges department in Grand Est in northeastern France.

== See also ==
- Communes of the Vosges department
