= Châtenois, Haute-Saône =

Châtenois
- Commune
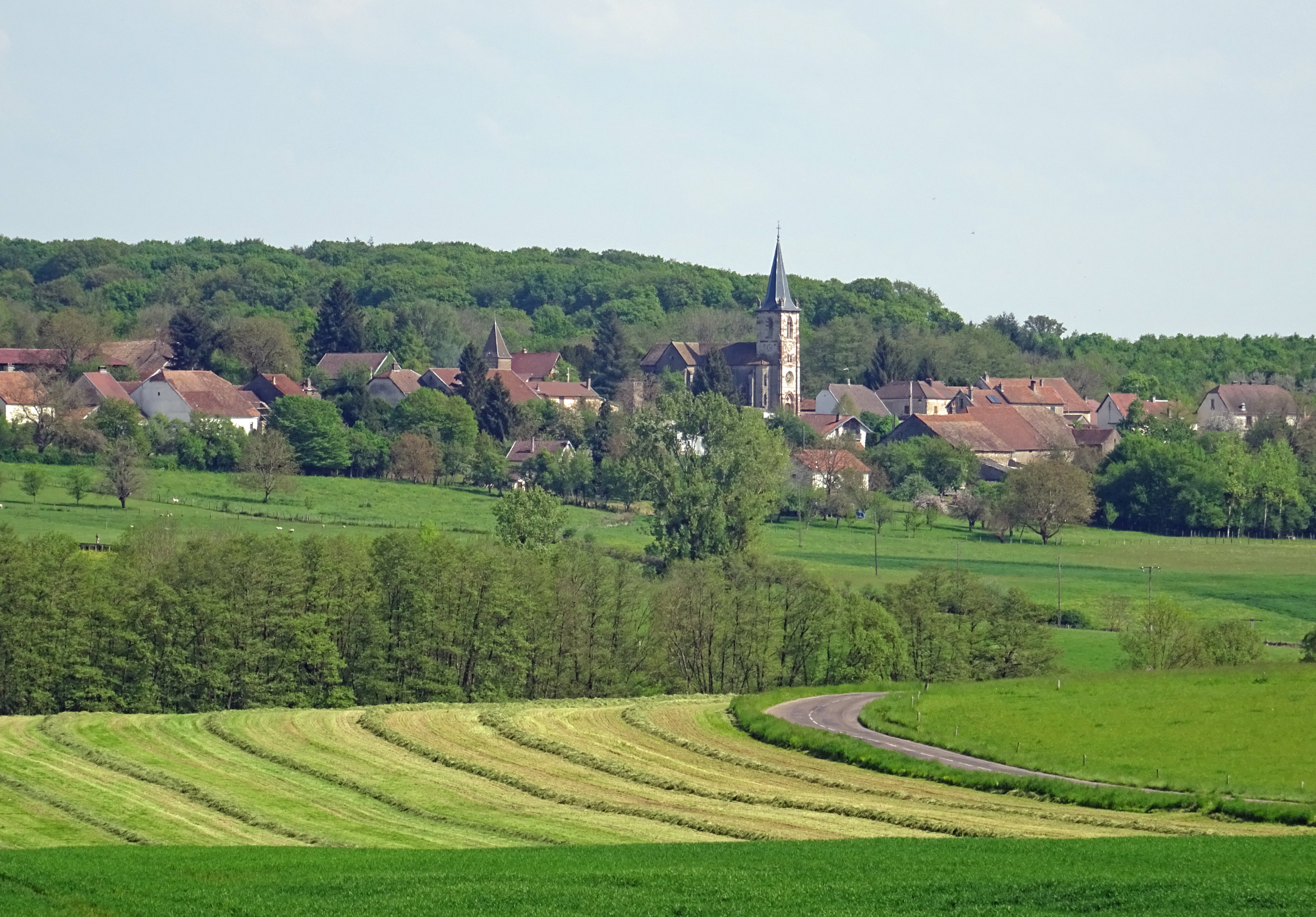
- A general view of Châtenois
- Location of Châtenois
- Location within France Location within Bourgogne-Franche-Comté
- Coordinates: 47°41′06″N 6°18′49″E
- Country: France
- Region: Bourgogne-Franche-Comté
- Department: Haute-Saône
- Arrondissement: Lure
- Canton: Lure-1

Government
  - Mayor (2020–2026): Victor Coulin
- Area^{1}: 5.75 km^{2} (2.22 sq mi)
- Highest elevation: 413 m (1,355 ft)
- Lowest elevation: 278 m (912 ft)
- Population (2023): 116
  - Density: 20.2/km^{2} (52.3/sq mi)
- Time zone: UTC+01:00 (CET)
  - Summer (DST): UTC+02:00 (CEST)
- INSEE/Postal code: 70141 /70240
- ^{1} French Land Register data, which excludes lakes, ponds, glaciers > 1 km^{2} (0.386 sq mi or 247 acres) and river estuaries.

Châtenois (French pronunciation: [ʃatnwa]) is a commune in the Haute-Saône department in the region of Bourgogne-Franche-Comté in eastern France.

== See also ==
- Communes of the Haute-Saône department
