= Plateau des Mille Étangs =

Coordinates: 47.8141°N 6.5880°E

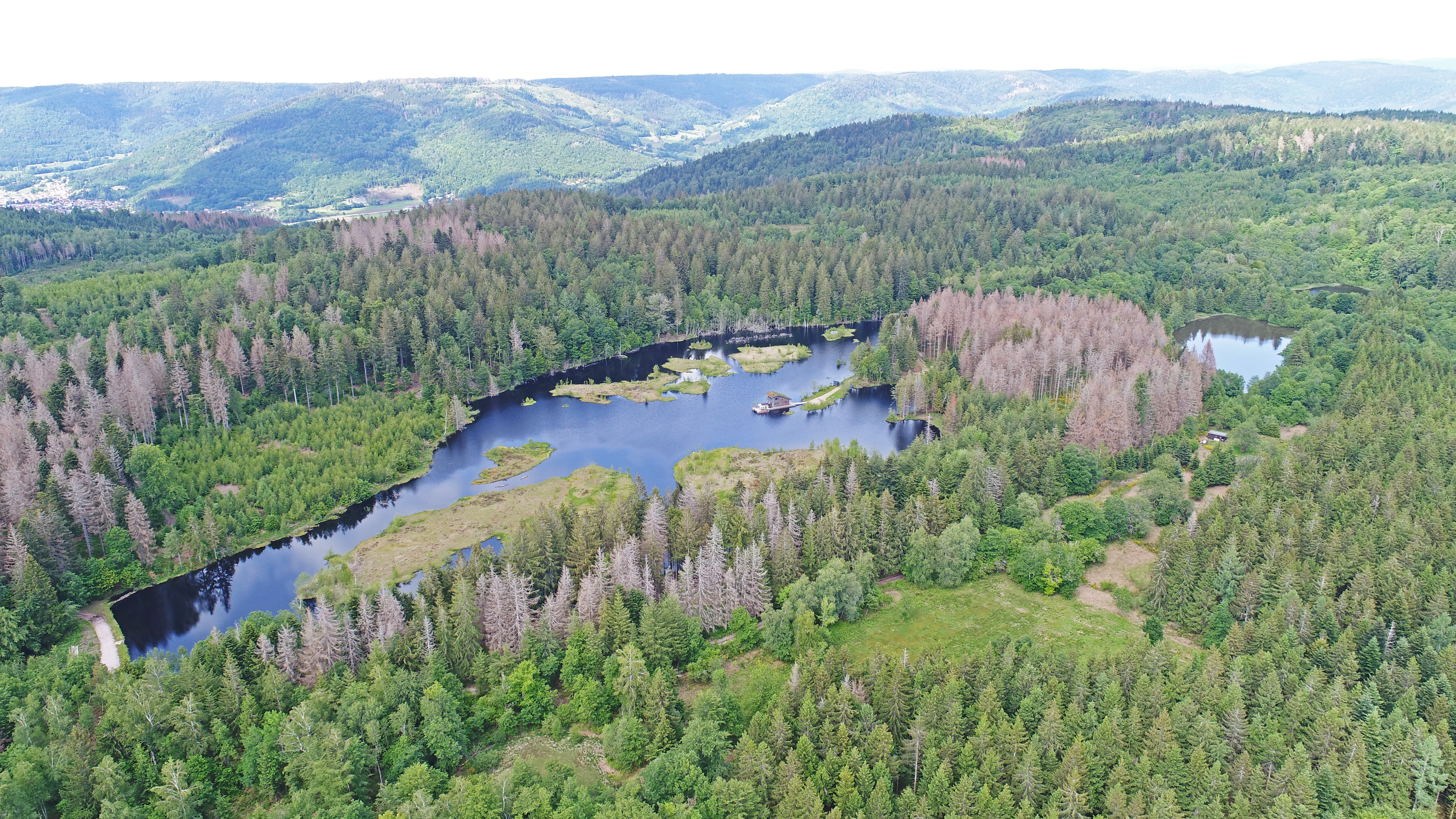
Oranger ponds at Corravillers

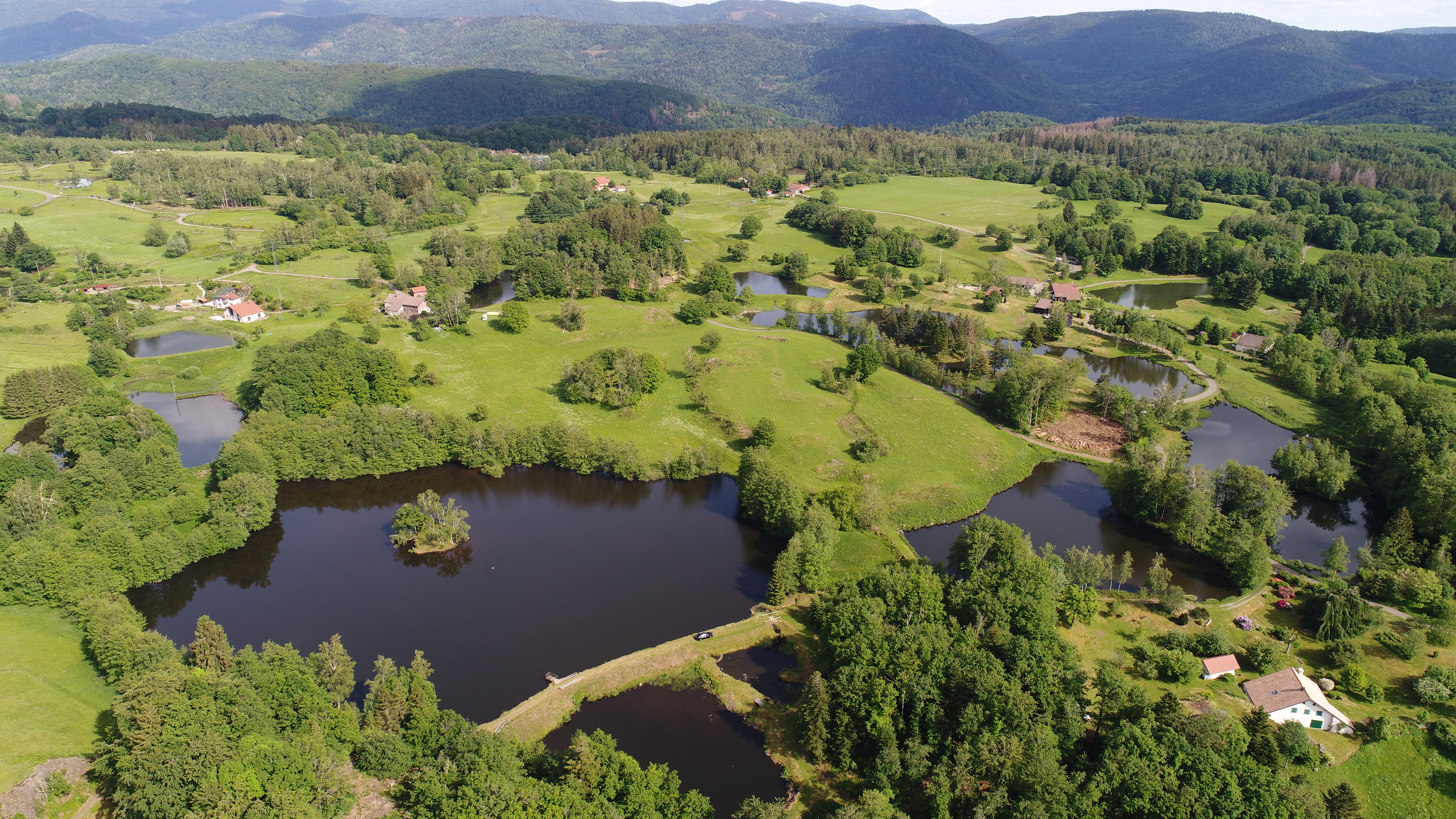
Several ponds of Servance-Miellin

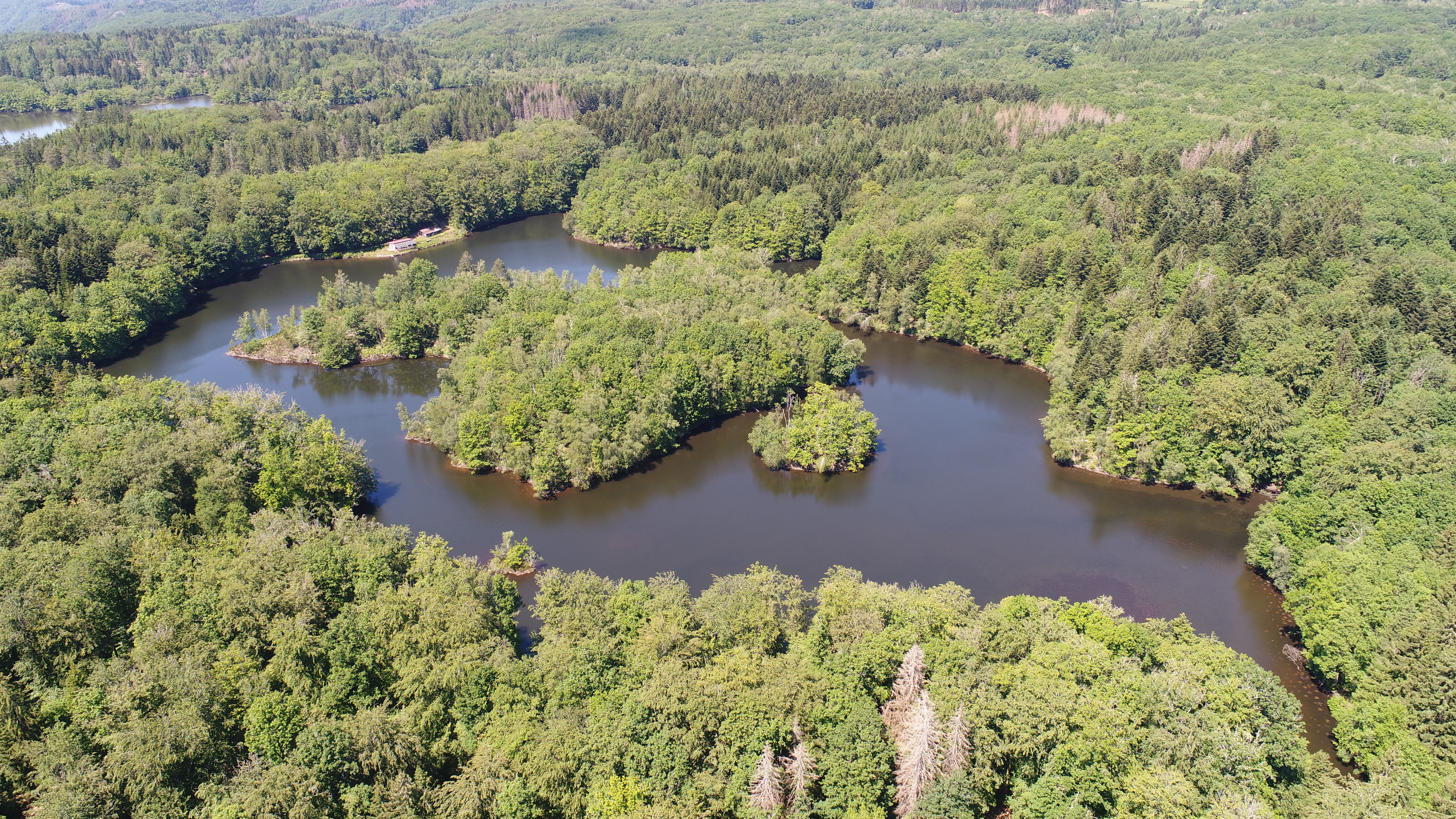
One of the Frahier ponds at Servance-Miellin

The Plateau des Mille étangs (literally : "Thousand Ponds Plateau") is a geographical area of more than 220 km2 located in the northeast part of the Haute-Saône department in the french region of Bourgogne-Franche-Comté.

At the end of the Last Glacial Period, 12,000 years ago, the retreat of the Moselle glacier overflowing above the Vosges formed deepening in the primary basement which covered the region favoring the formation of peatlands, swamps in three plateaus of different altitudes. In the Middle Ages, the space was transformed by Man, who developed fish farming there by developing ponds. These water reserves were then used in the 19th and 20th centuries by the local textile and paper industries.

At the beginning of the 21st century, this region, mostly covered with forest, is of environmental interest due to its wetlands which are home to remarkable biotopes adapted to a cold and humid environment. This Thousand Ponds region is recognized as a Zone naturelle d'intérêt écologique, faunistique et floristique (ZNIEFF), it is largely included in a Natura 2000 area and in the Ballons des Vosges Nature Park; to the south is the Grande Pile peat bog regional nature reserve. The Thousand Ponds also have a tourist interest by its landscapes which are worth to him the nickname of "Little Finland" by analogy with the "Thousand Lakes" Finnish.

Landscape

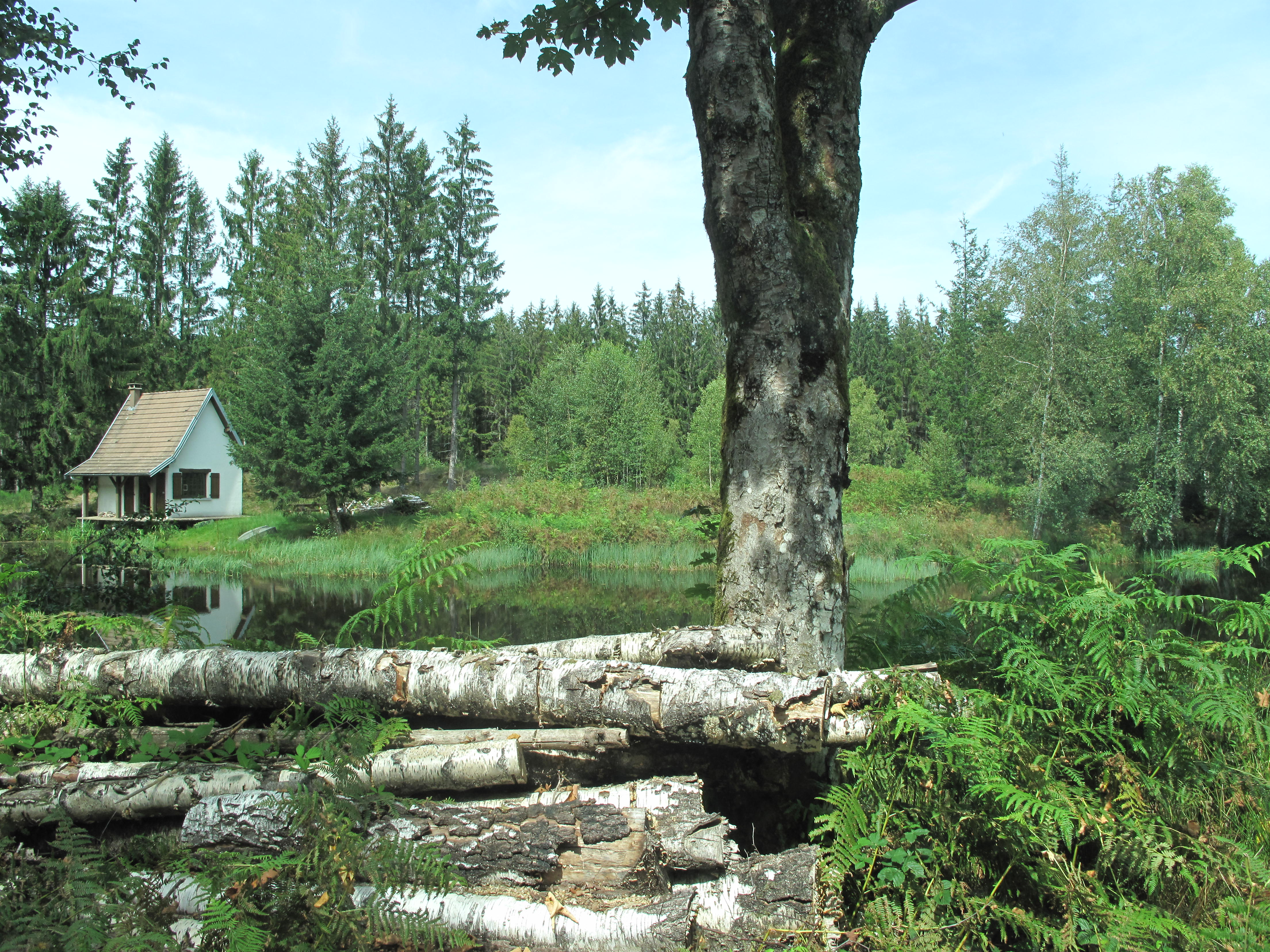
Forest

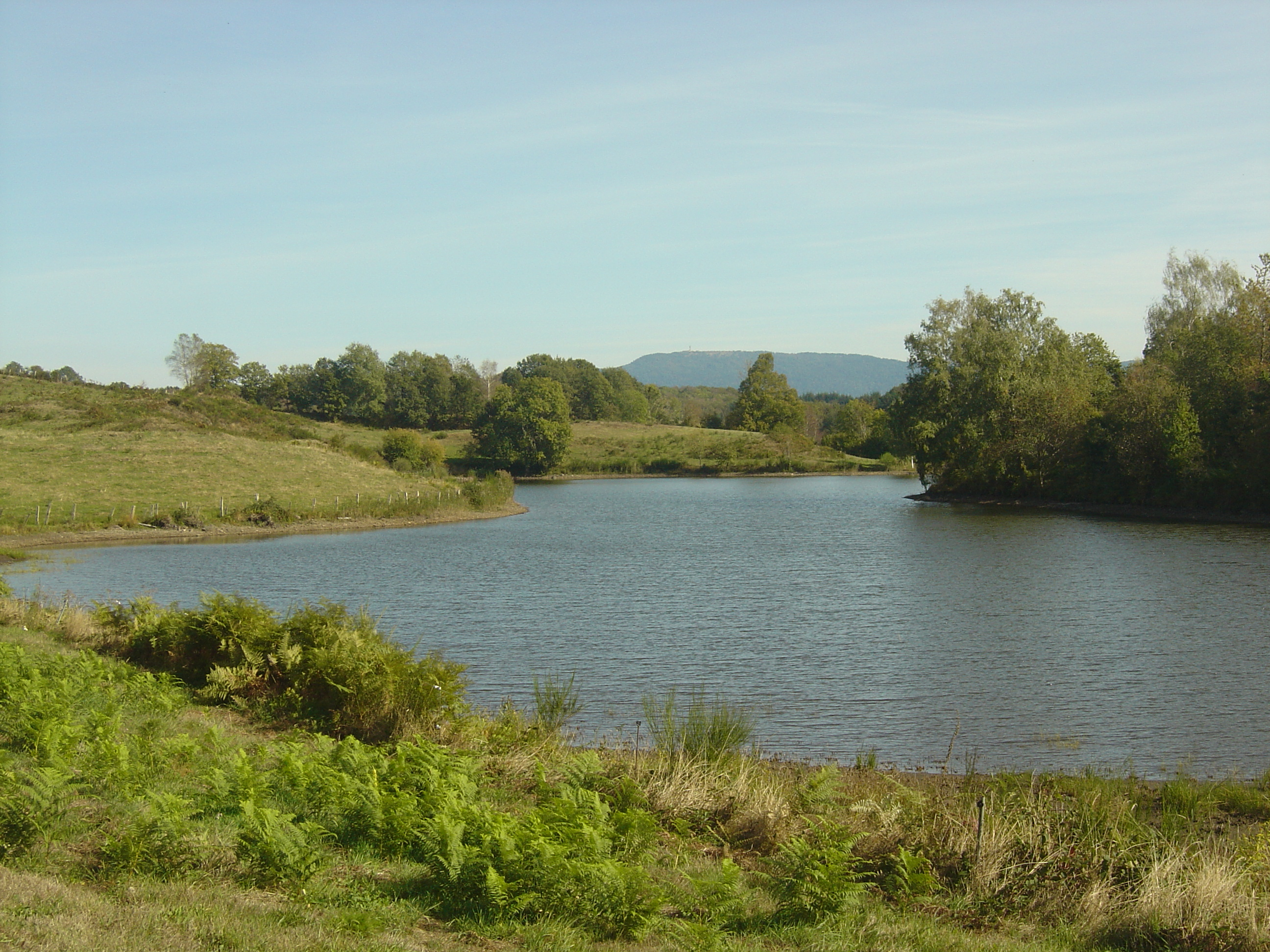
Meadow with ballon de Servance in the background

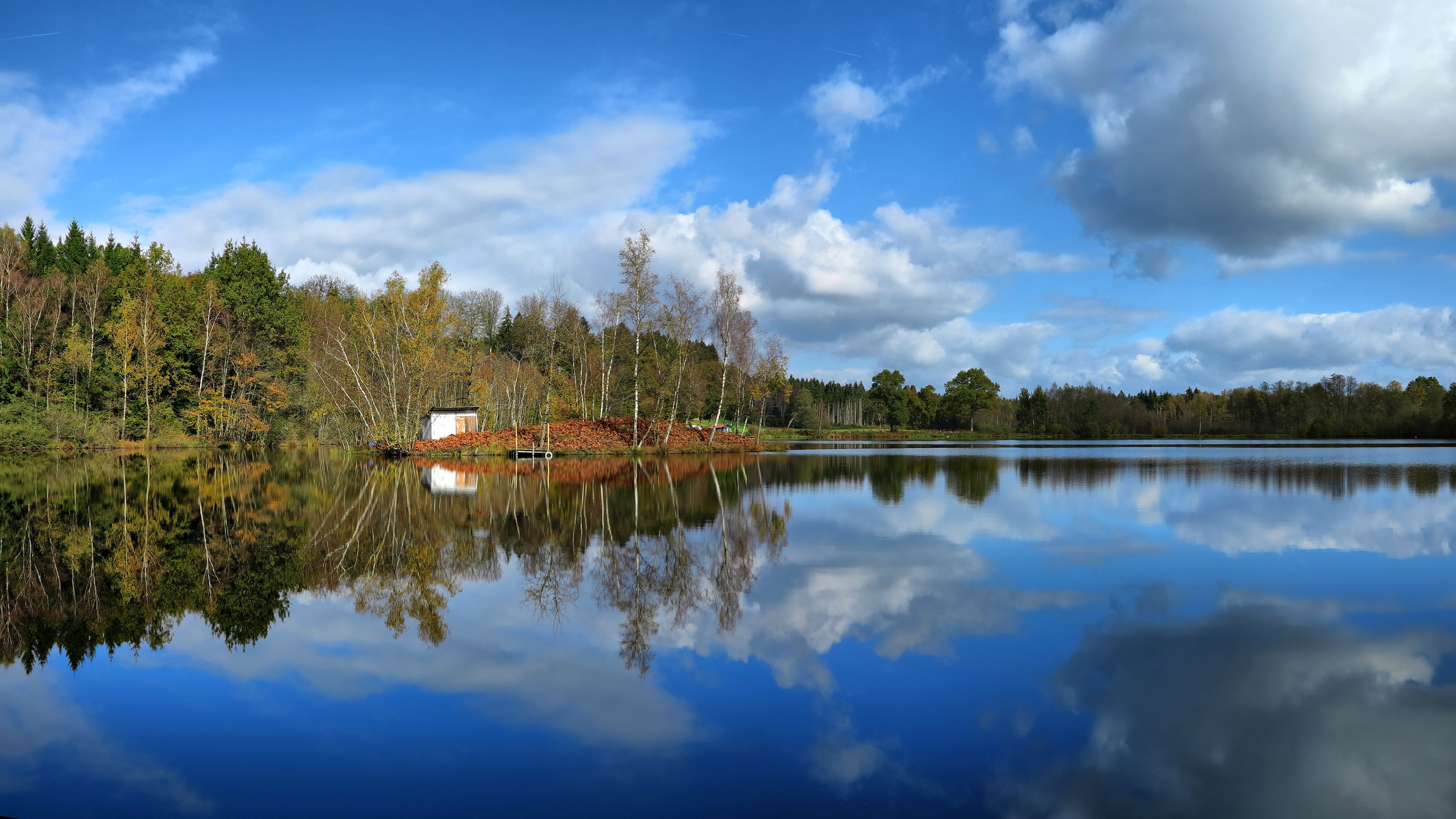
Typical pond with fisherman's hut

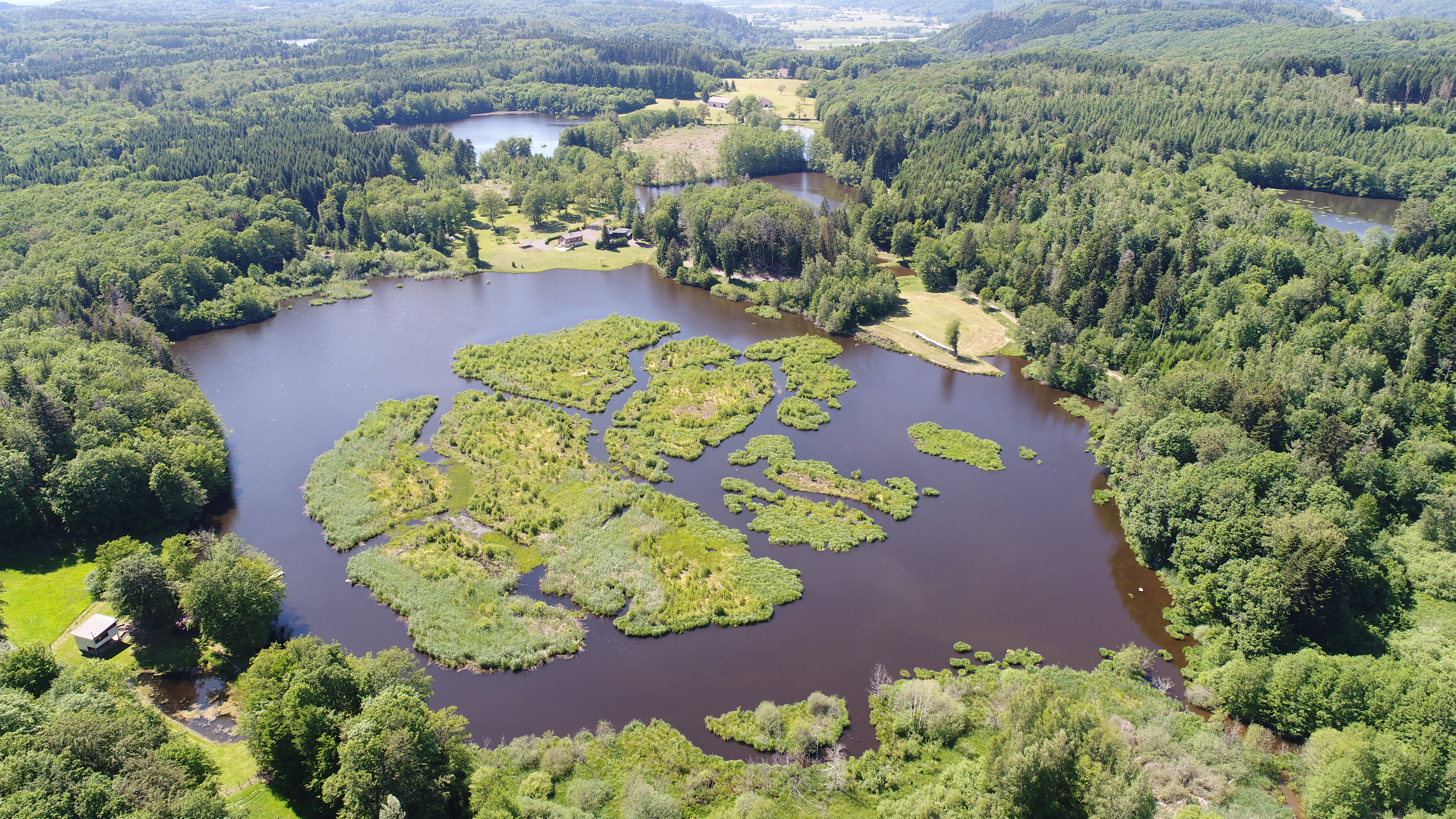
Grands Prés ponds at La Voivre
