= Ballons des Vosges Nature Park =

Protected area in northeastern France

- IUCN category V (protected landscape/seascape)
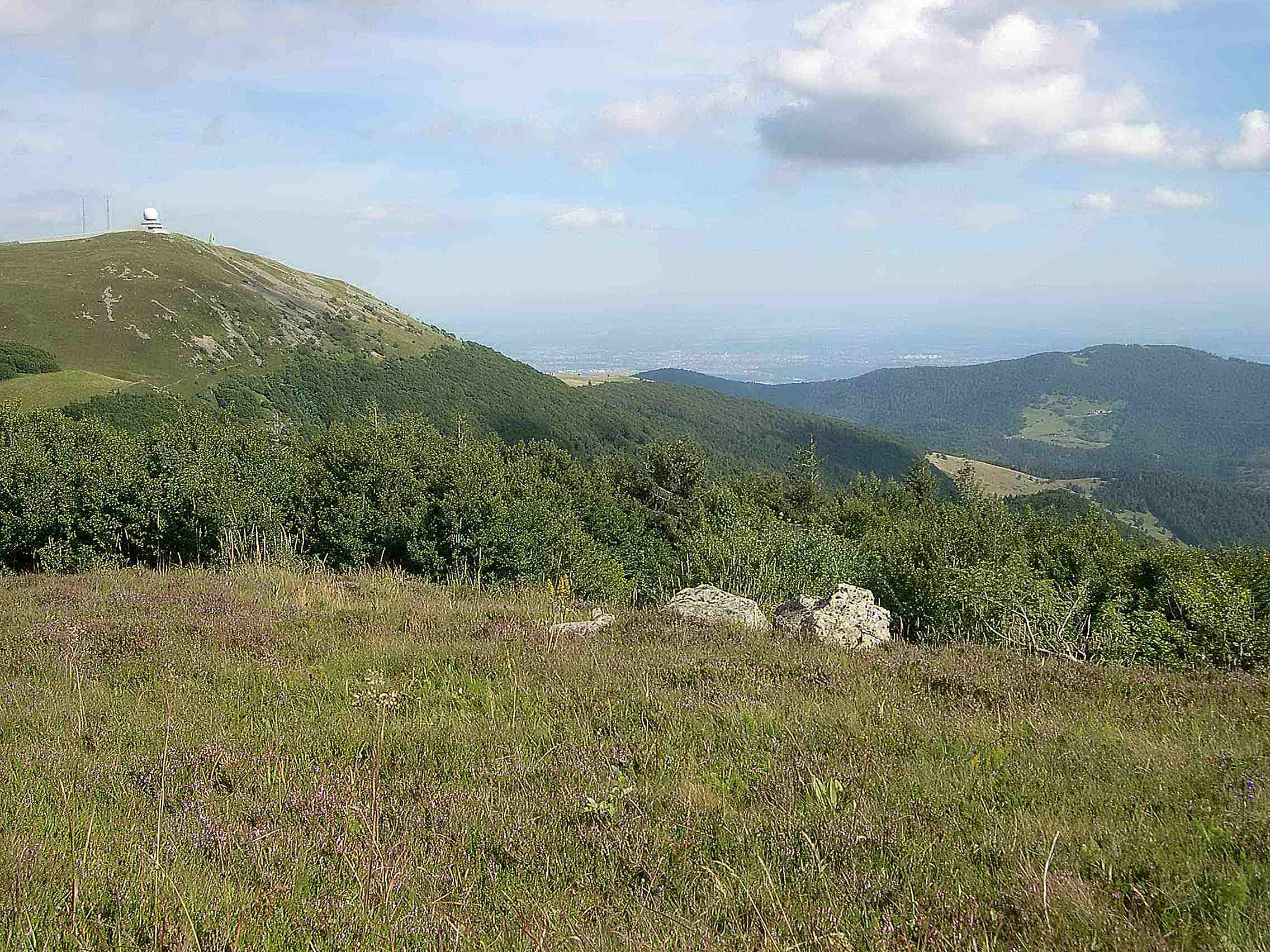
- The Grand Ballon seen from the Storkenkopf

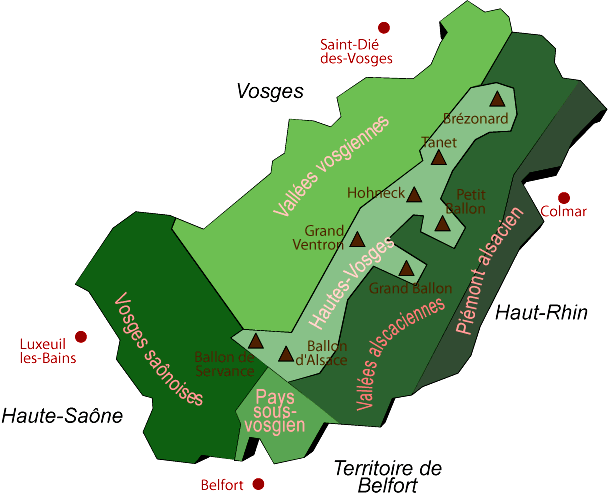
- Location: Grand Est; Bourgogne-Franche-Comté, France
- Coordinates: 47.97716038°N 6.93488367°E
- Area: 2,700 km^{2} (1,000 sq mi)
- Established: 1989
- Governing body: Fédération des parcs naturels régionaux de France
- Website: www.parc-ballons-vosges.fr

The Ballons des Vosges Regional Nature Park (French: Parc naturel régional des Ballons des Vosges) is a protected area of woodland, pasture, wetland, farmland and historical sites in the regions of Grand Est and Bourgogne-Franche-Comté in northeastern France. The area was officially designated as a regional natural park in 1989. 187 communes belonging to the departments of Haut-Rhin, Vosges, Haute-Saône and Territoire de Belfort are members of the park, which hosts 238,000 inhabitants. It is one of the largest and most populated French regional parks. A wide range of habitats available in the park benefit a variety of wildlife such as boreal owl, lynx, peregrine falcon, western capercaillie, Dianthus superbus, cranberry and Drosera.

== Image gallery ==
Landscapes

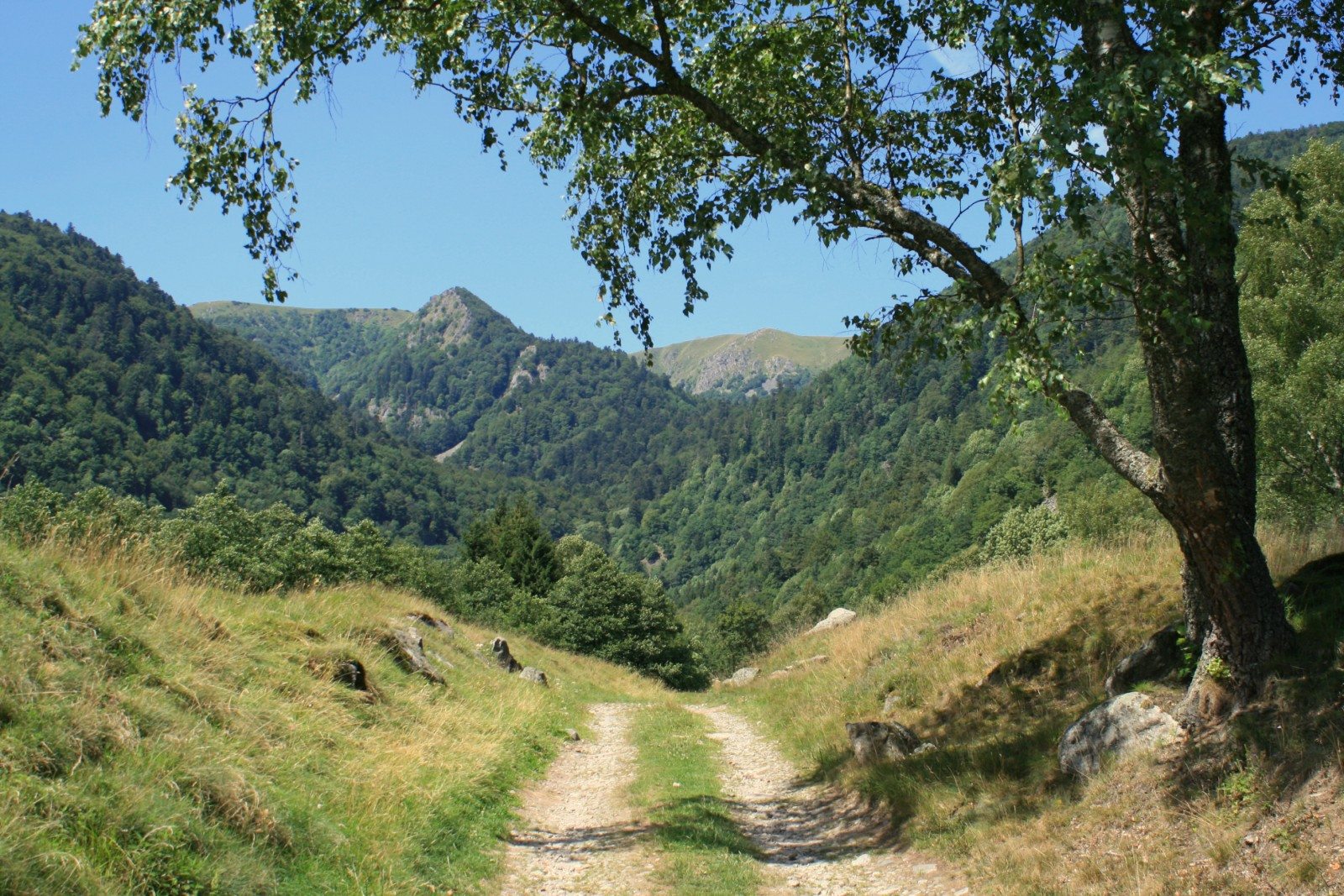

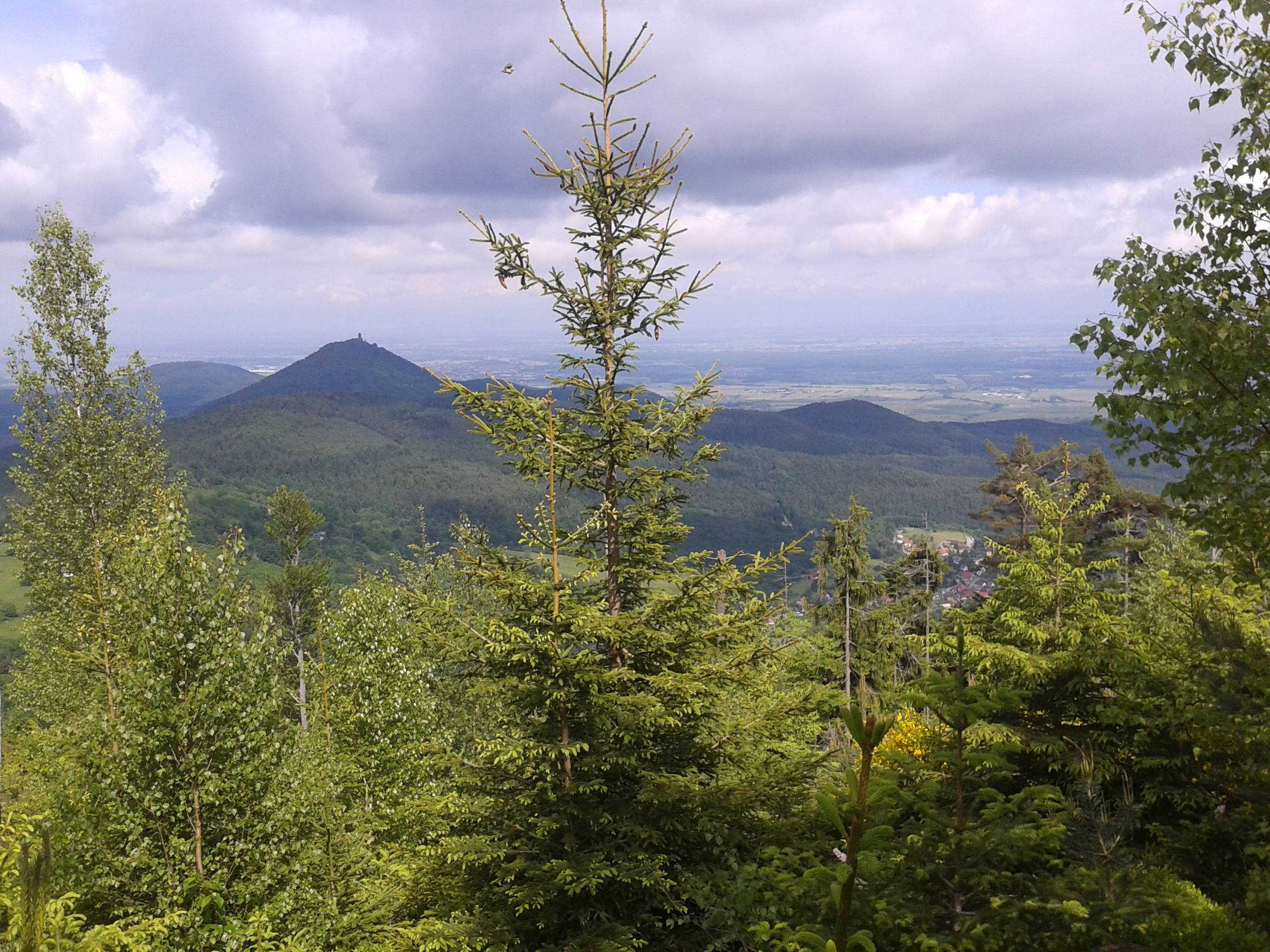

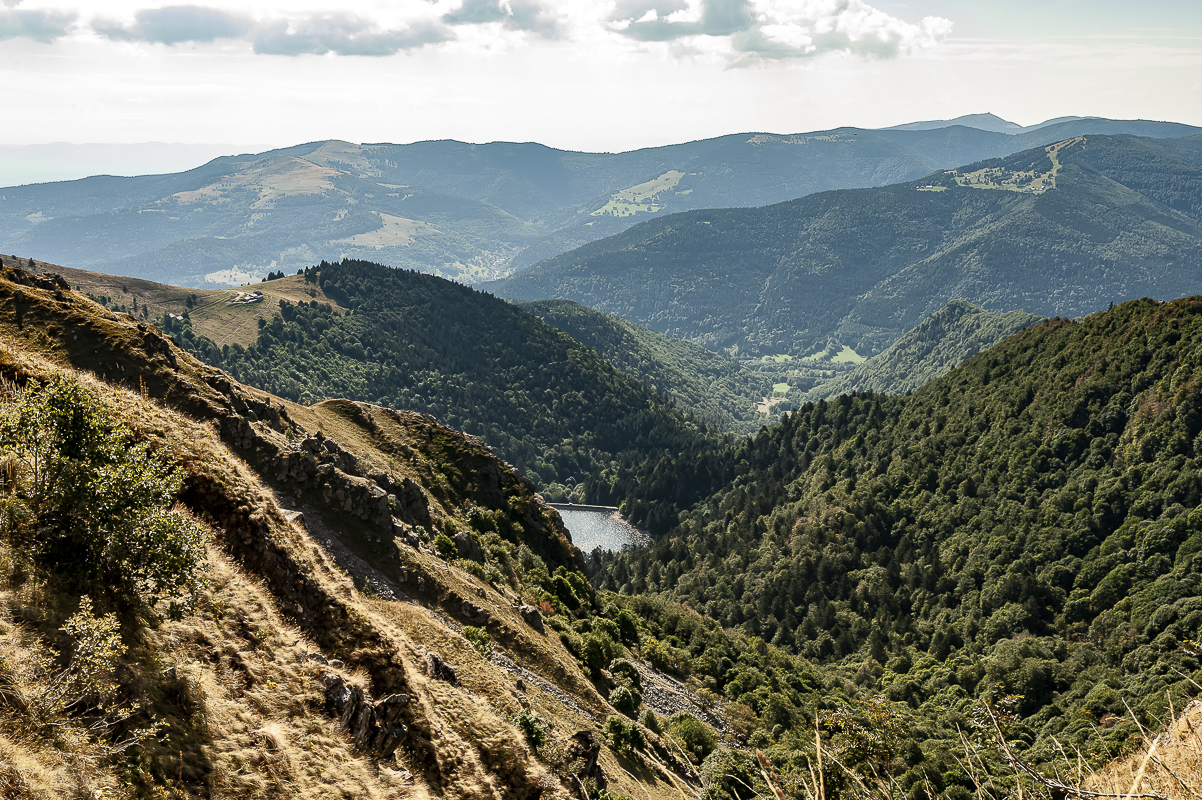
Mont Hohneck

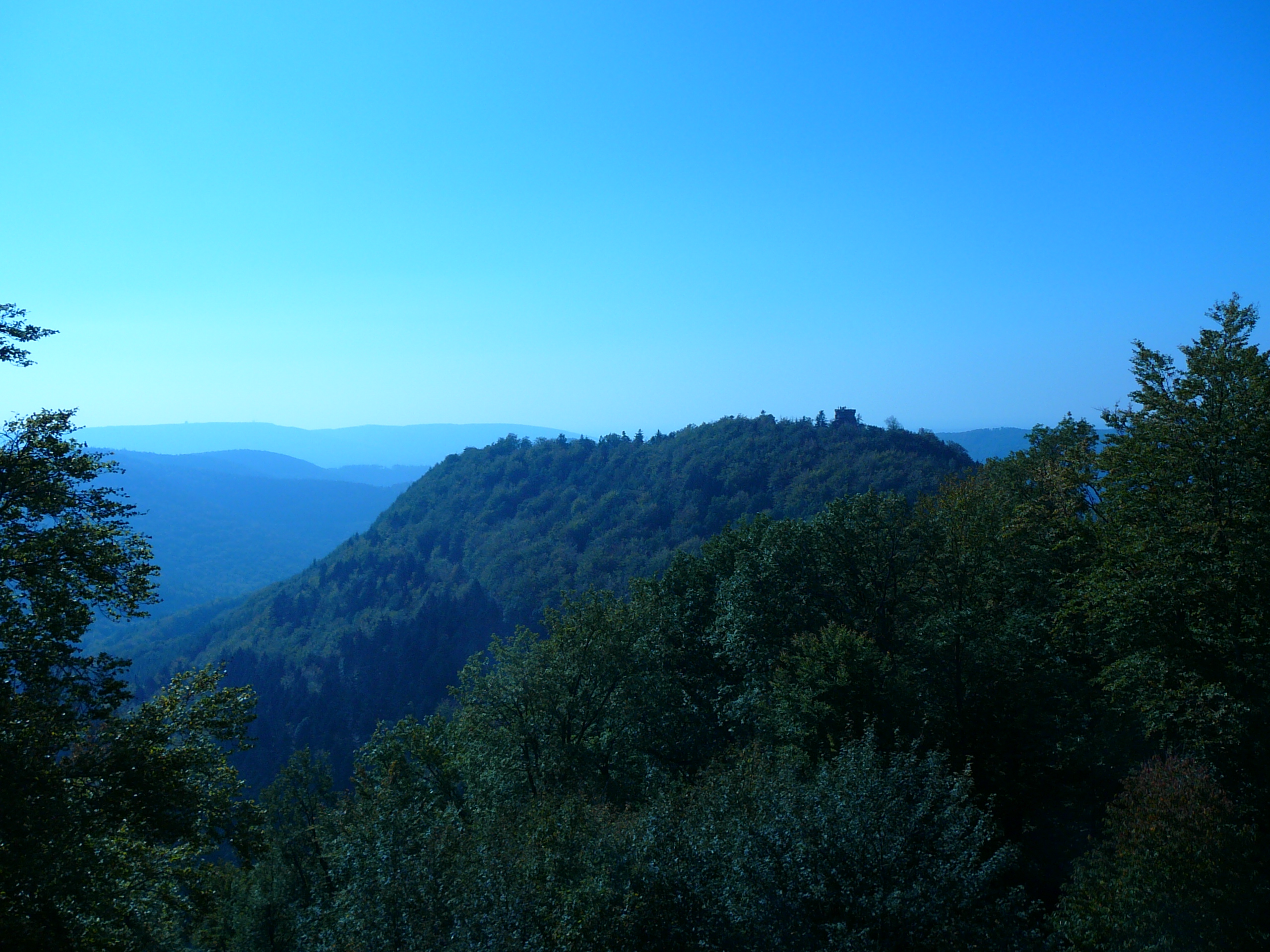
Twilight

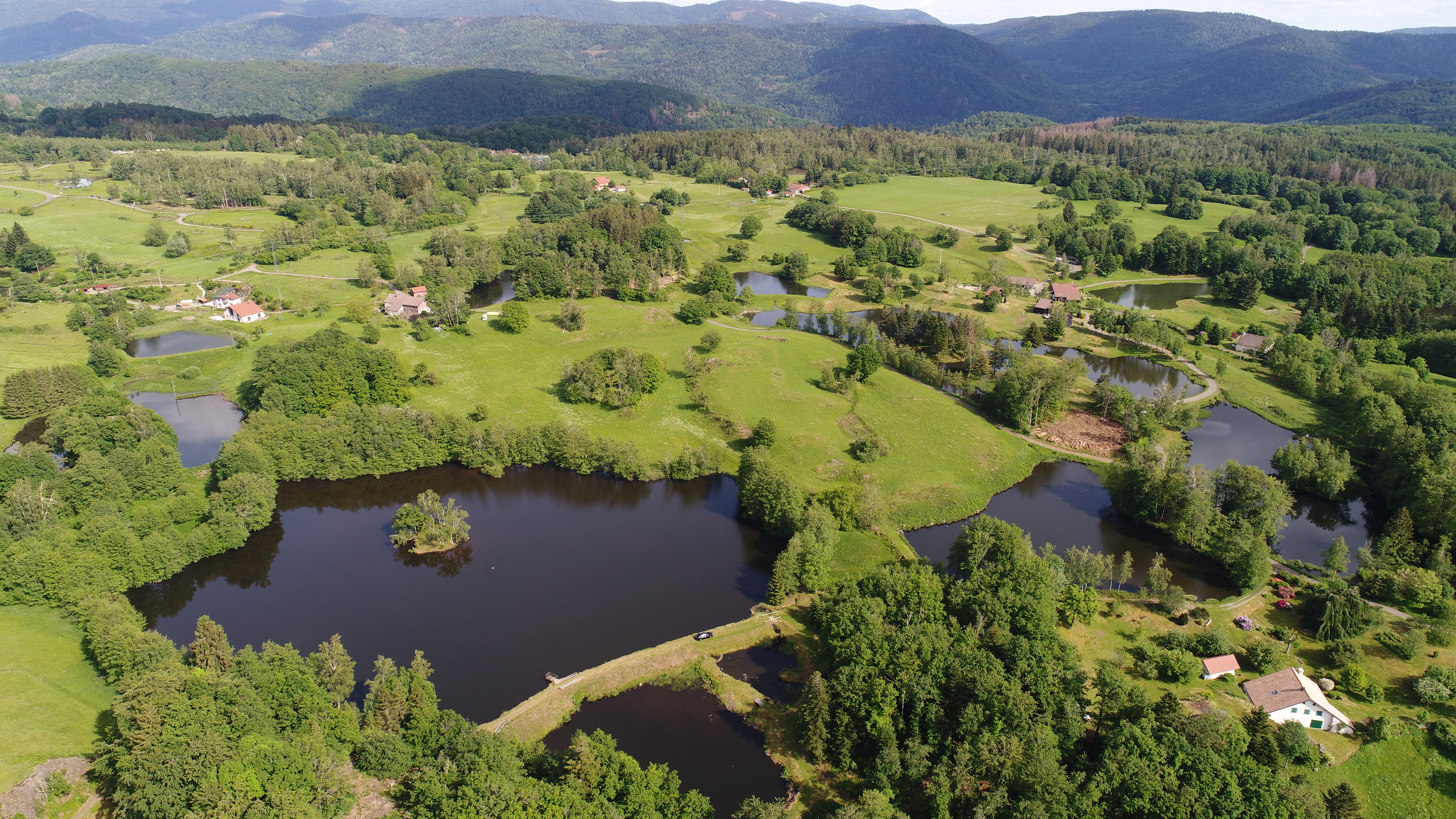
Landcap of Plateau des Mille Étangs

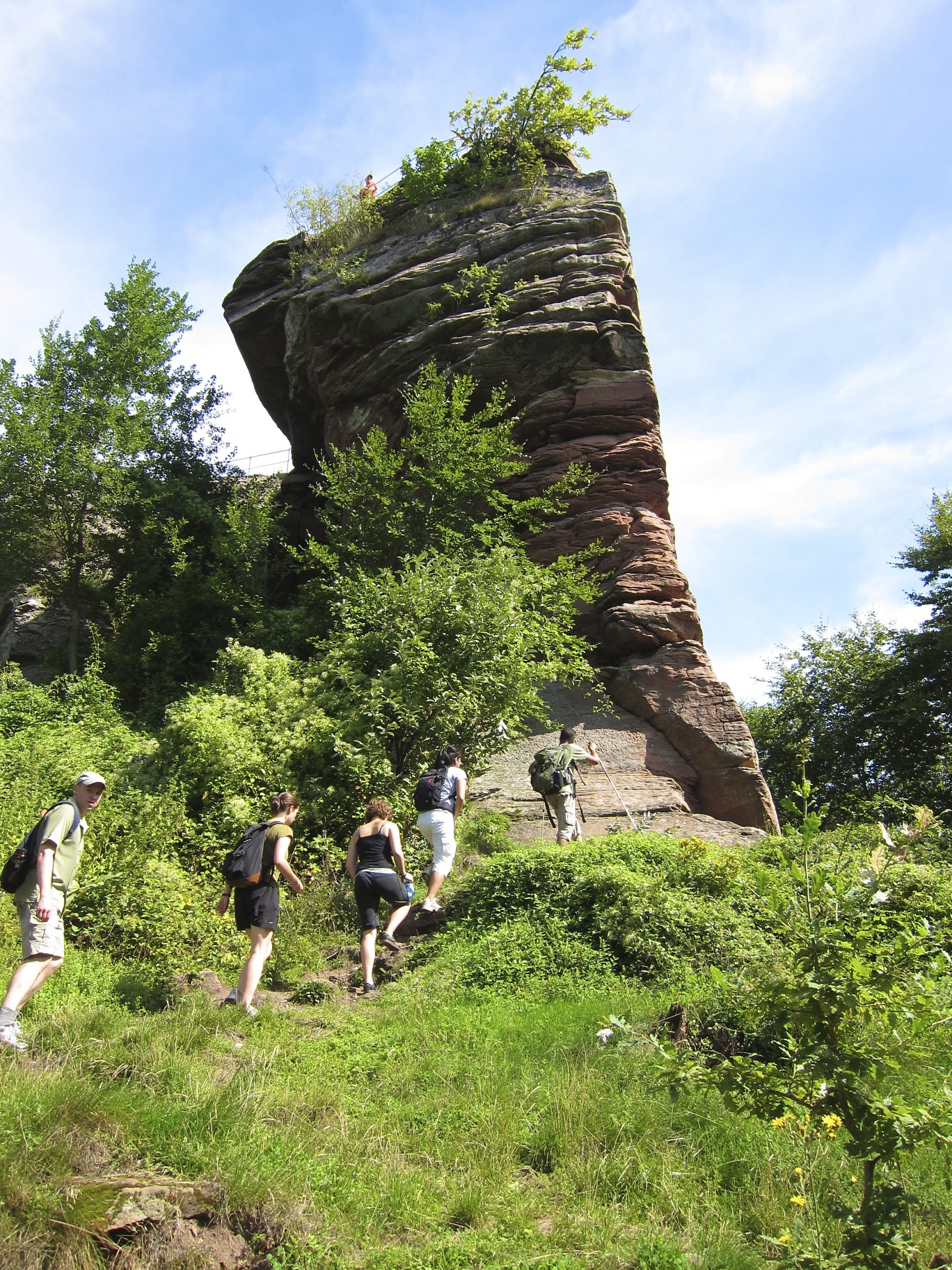
Viewpoint Château de Lœwenstein

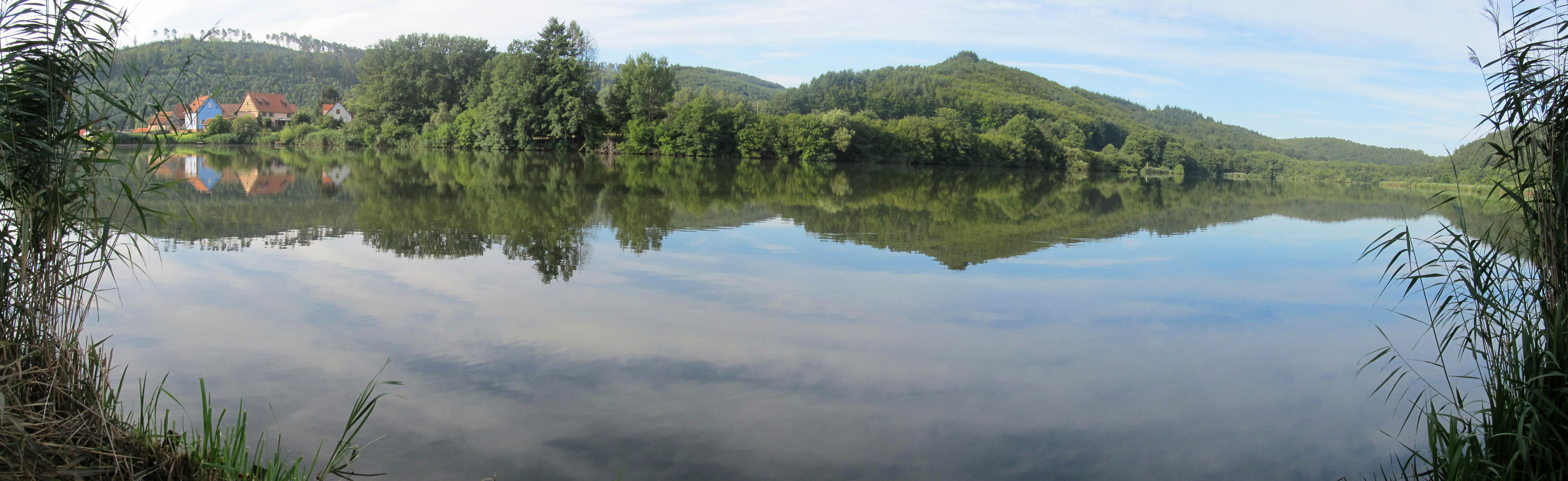
Baerenthal dam

Culture

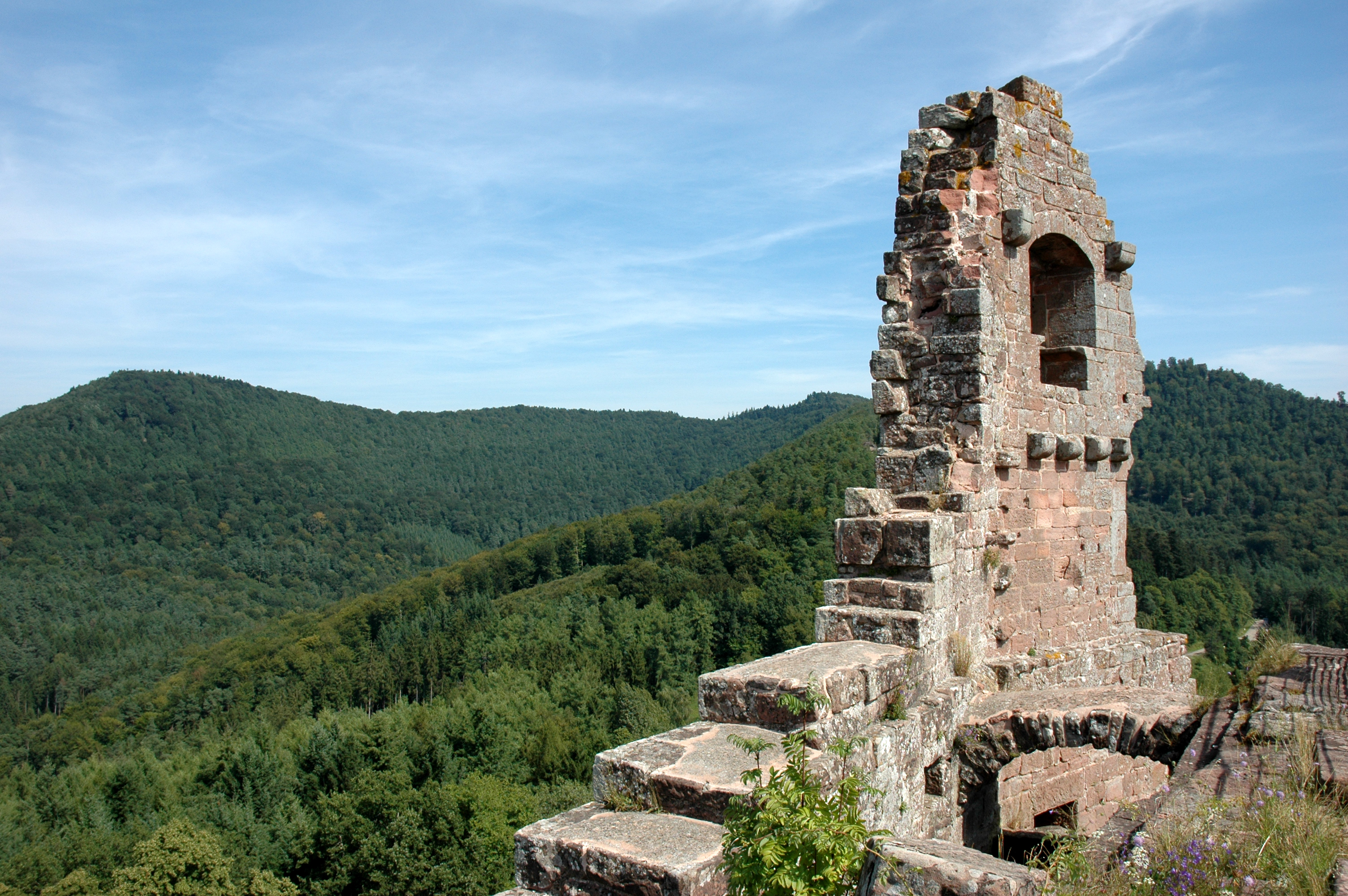
Fleckenstein ruins

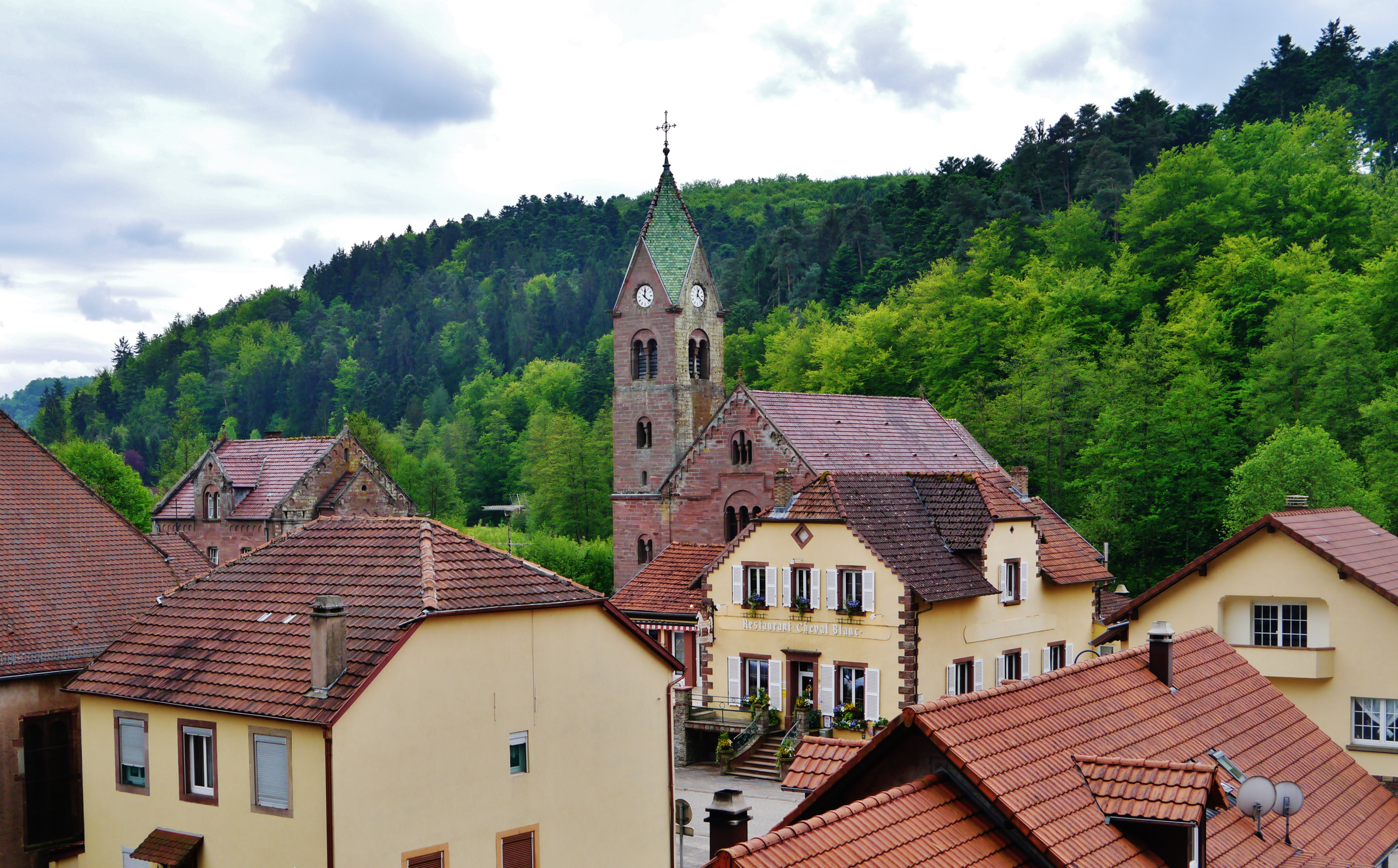
Graufthal village

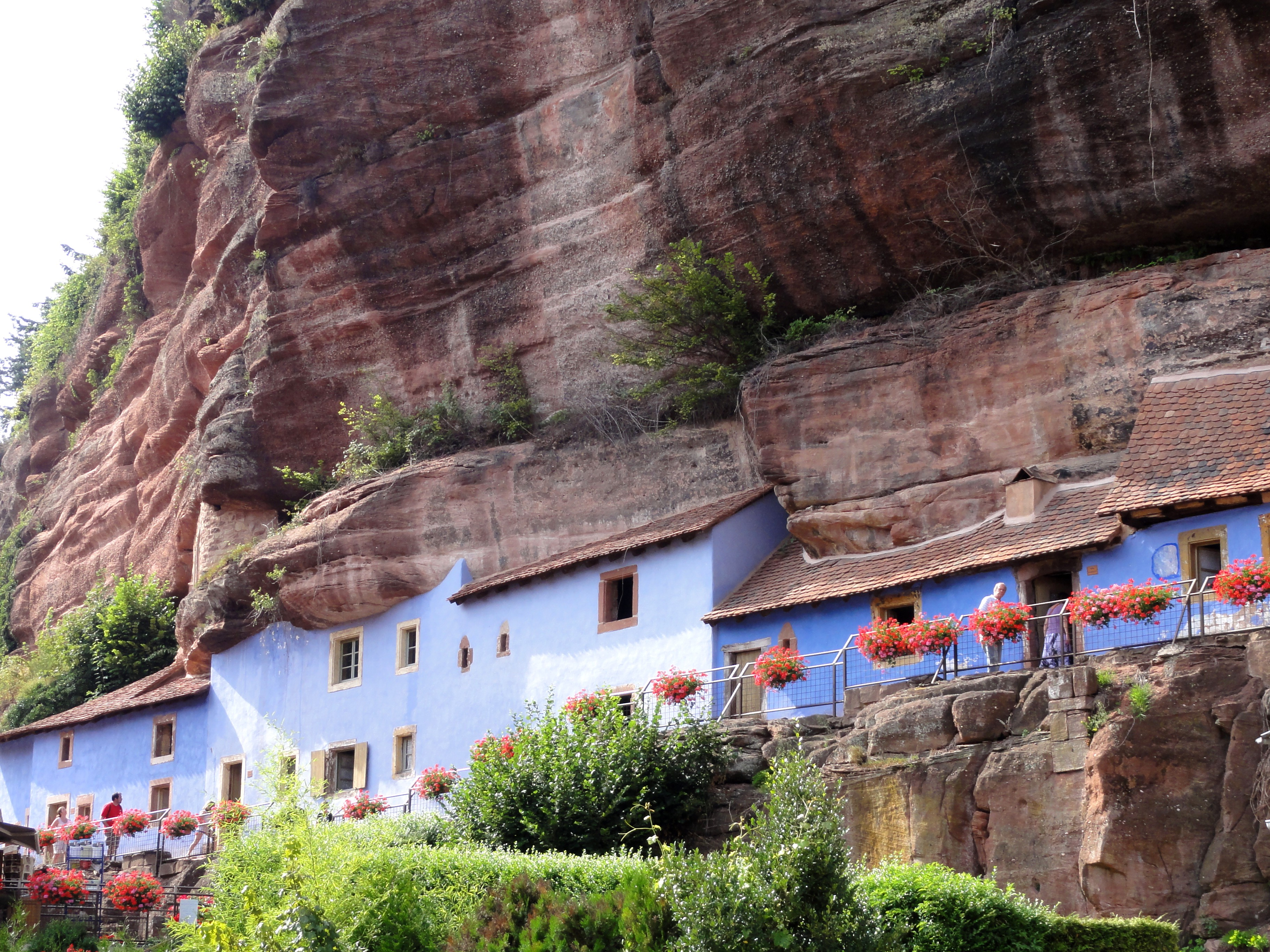
Cave-houses in Graufthal

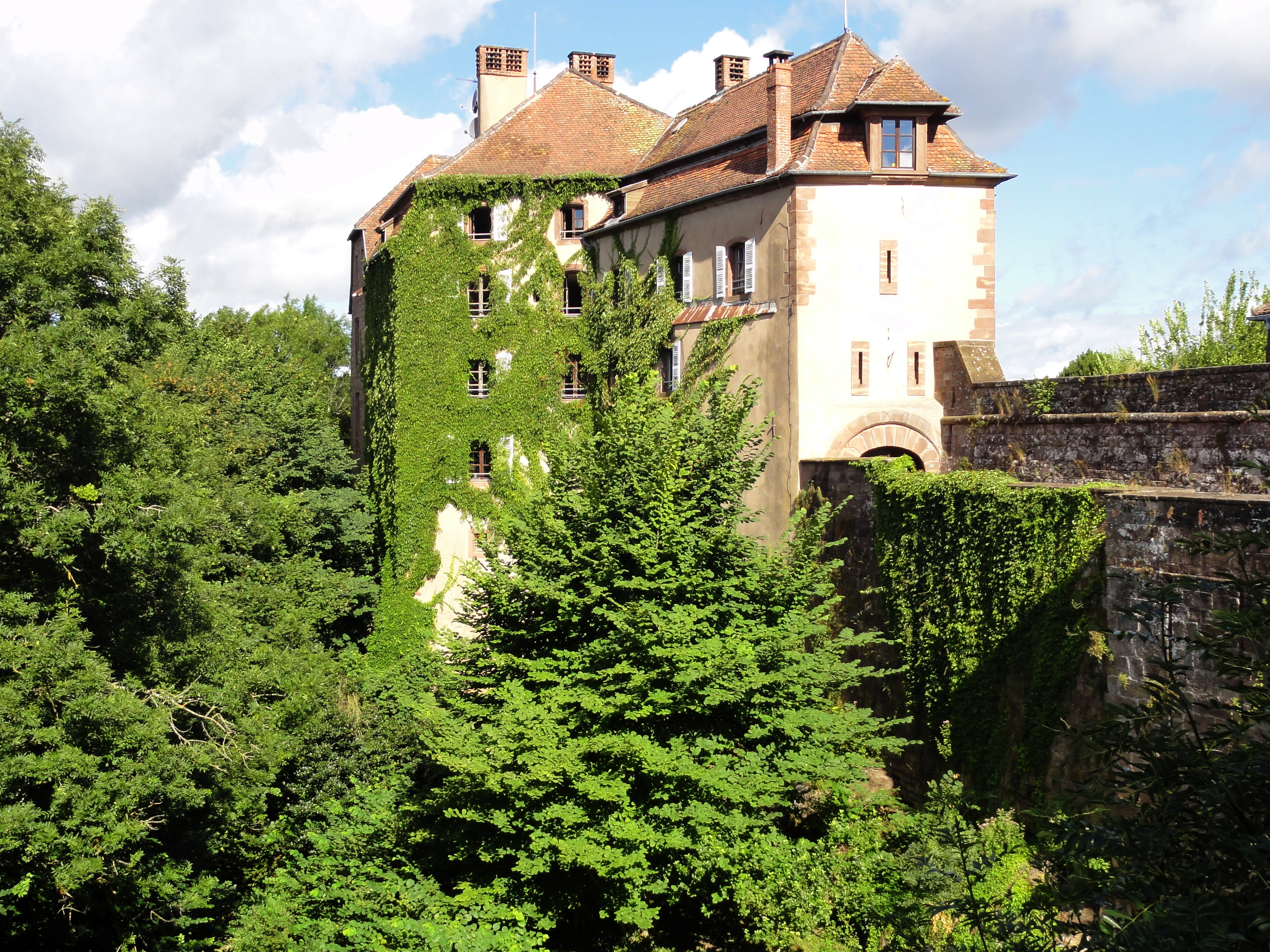
Château de La Petite-Pierre

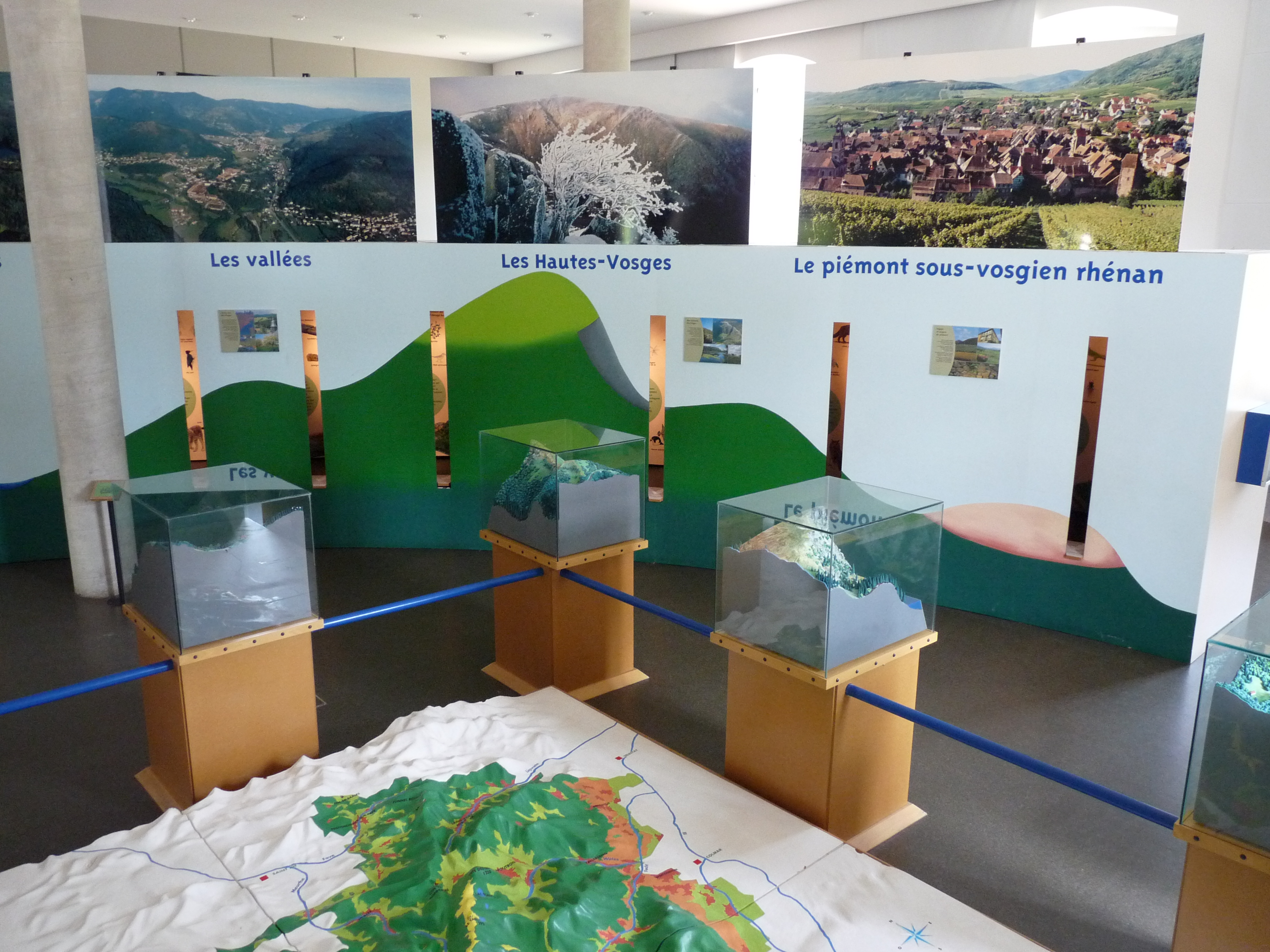
A permanent exhibition in the Munster park's headquarters

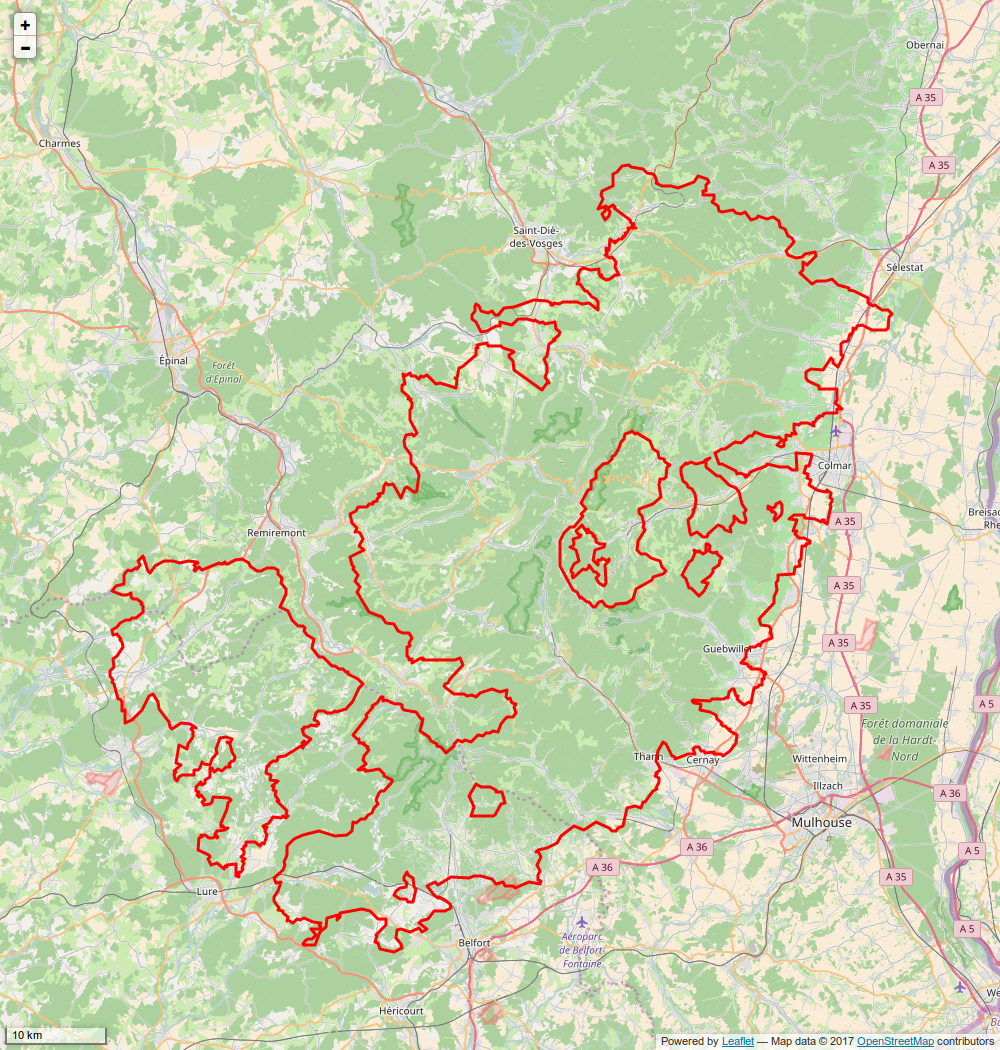
Map of the nature park

== See also ==
- List of regional natural parks of France
- Flora of the Vosges massif
