= Vy-lès-Filain =

- Commune
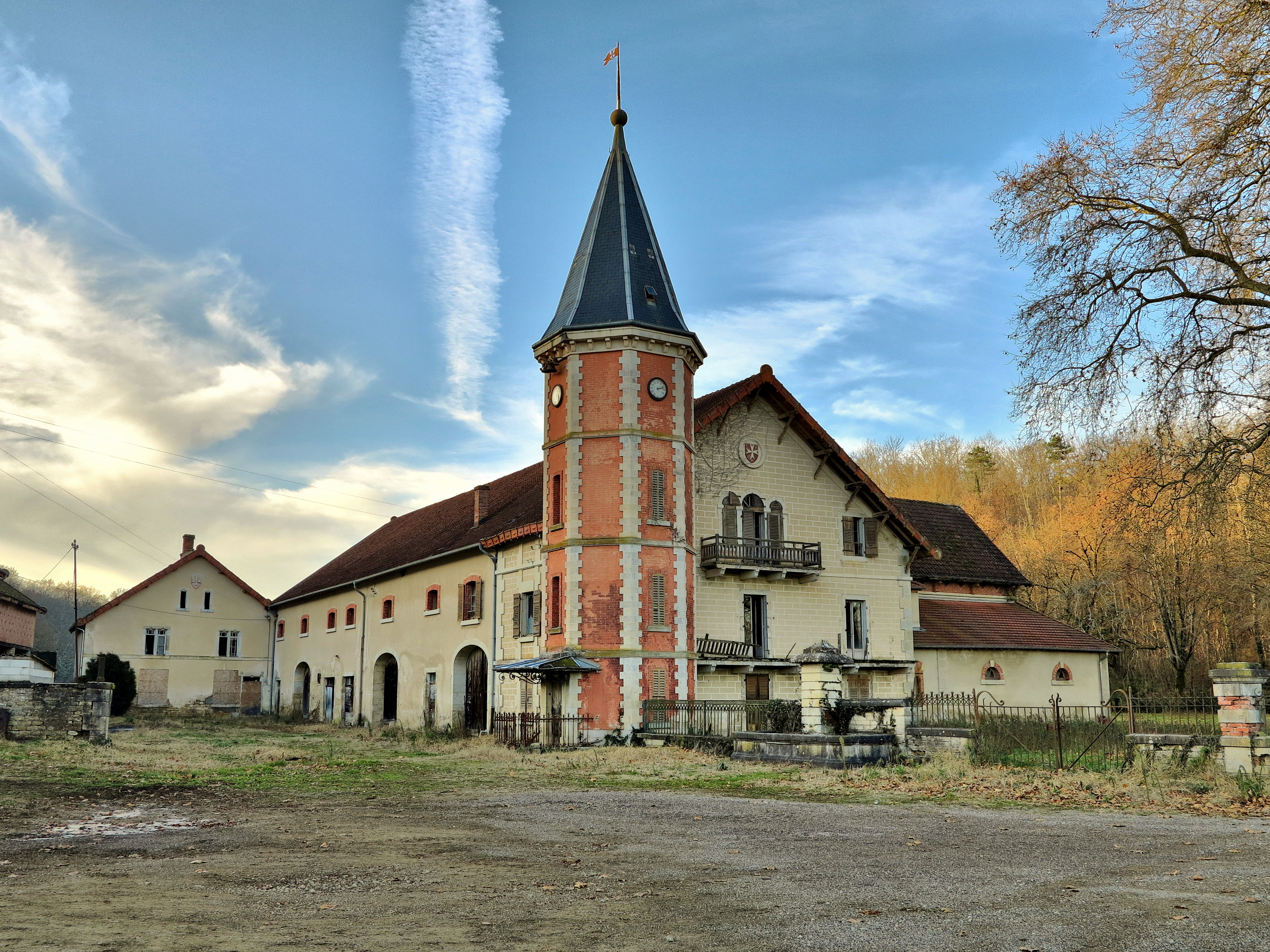
- The Laine farm in Vy-lès-Filain

- Coat of arms
- Location of Vy-lès-Filain
- Location within France Location within Bourgogne-Franche-Comté
- Coordinates: 47°30′46″N 6°11′48″E
- Country: France
- Region: Bourgogne-Franche-Comté
- Department: Haute-Saône
- Arrondissement: Vesoul
- Canton: Rioz
- Intercommunality: Pays de Montbozon et du Chanois

Government
  - Mayor (2020–2026): Jean-Claude Abrecht
- Area^{1}: 5.31 km^{2} (2.05 sq mi)
- Highest elevation: 320 m (1,050 ft)
- Lowest elevation: 252 m (827 ft)
- Population (2023): 143
  - Density: 26.9/km^{2} (69.7/sq mi)
- Time zone: UTC+01:00 (CET)
  - Summer (DST): UTC+02:00 (CEST)
- INSEE/Postal code: 70583 /70230
- ^{1} French Land Register data, which excludes lakes, ponds, glaciers > 1 km^{2} (0.386 sq mi or 247 acres) and river estuaries.

Vy-lès-Filain (French pronunciation: [vi lɛ filɛ̃], literally Vy near Filain) is a commune in the Haute-Saône department in the region of Bourgogne-Franche-Comté in eastern France.

== Population ==
Historical population
Year	Pop.	±% p.a.
1968	88	—
1975	57	−6.02%
1982	75	+4.00%
1990	70	−0.86%
1999	73	+0.47%
2007	72	−0.17%
2012	111	+9.04%
2017	126	+2.57%
2023	143	+2.13%
Source: INSEE

== See also ==
- Communes of the Haute-Saône department
