= Thiénans =

- Commune
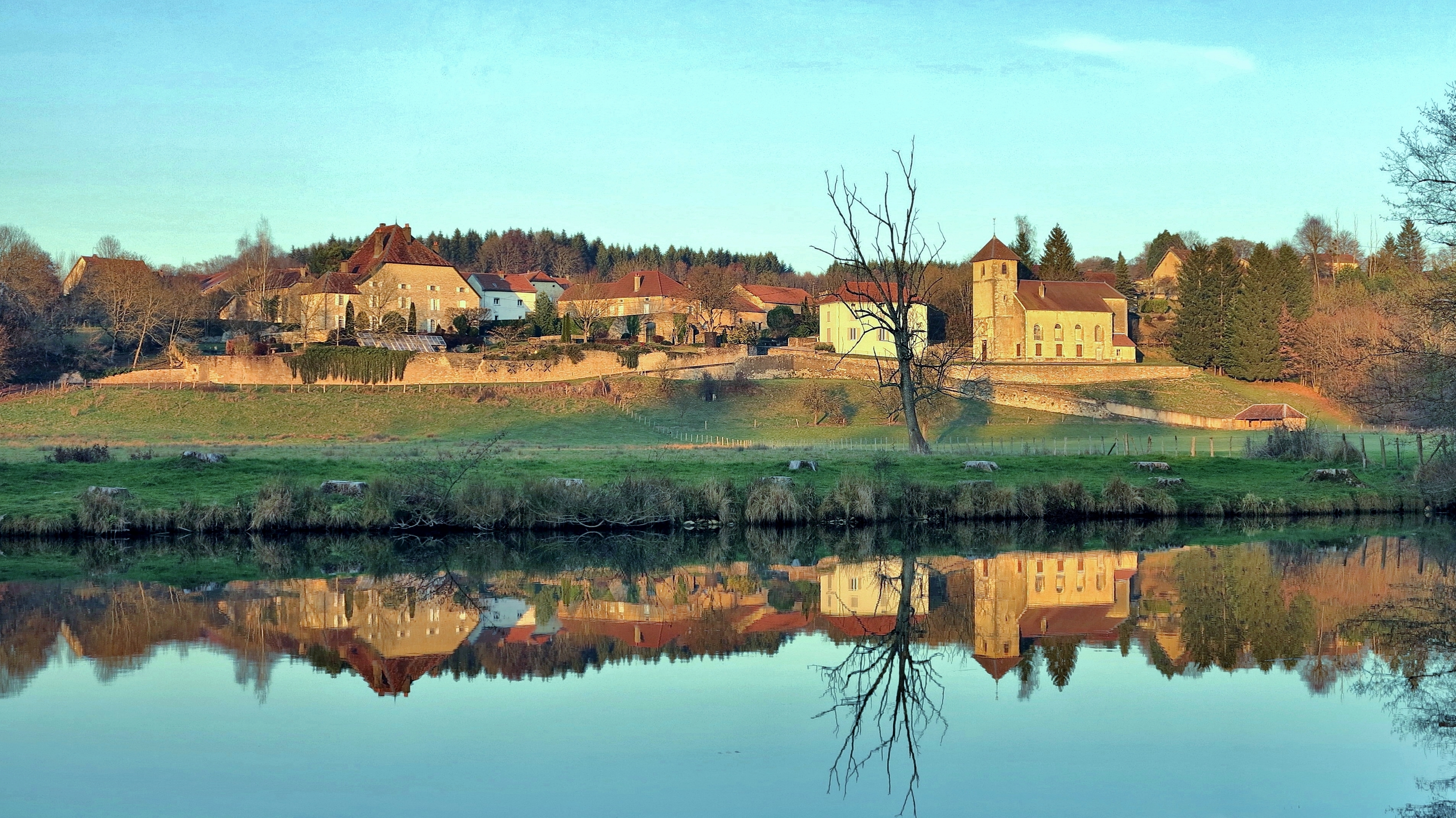
- A general view of Thiénans
- Location of Thiénans
- Location within France Location within Bourgogne-Franche-Comté
- Coordinates: 47°28′05″N 6°16′23″E
- Country: France
- Region: Bourgogne-Franche-Comté
- Department: Haute-Saône
- Arrondissement: Vesoul
- Canton: Rioz

Government
  - Mayor (2020–2026): Colette Beauprêtre
- Area^{1}: 4.11 km^{2} (1.59 sq mi)
- Highest elevation: 313 m (1,027 ft)
- Lowest elevation: 241 m (791 ft)
- Population (2023): 112
  - Density: 27.3/km^{2} (70.6/sq mi)
- Time zone: UTC+01:00 (CET)
  - Summer (DST): UTC+02:00 (CEST)
- INSEE/Postal code: 70501 /70230
- ^{1} French Land Register data, which excludes lakes, ponds, glaciers > 1 km^{2} (0.386 sq mi or 247 acres) and river estuaries.

Thiénans (French pronunciation: [tjenɑ̃]) is a commune in the Haute-Saône department in the region of Bourgogne-Franche-Comté in eastern France.

== See also ==
- Communes of the Haute-Saône department
