= Traitiéfontaine =

- Commune
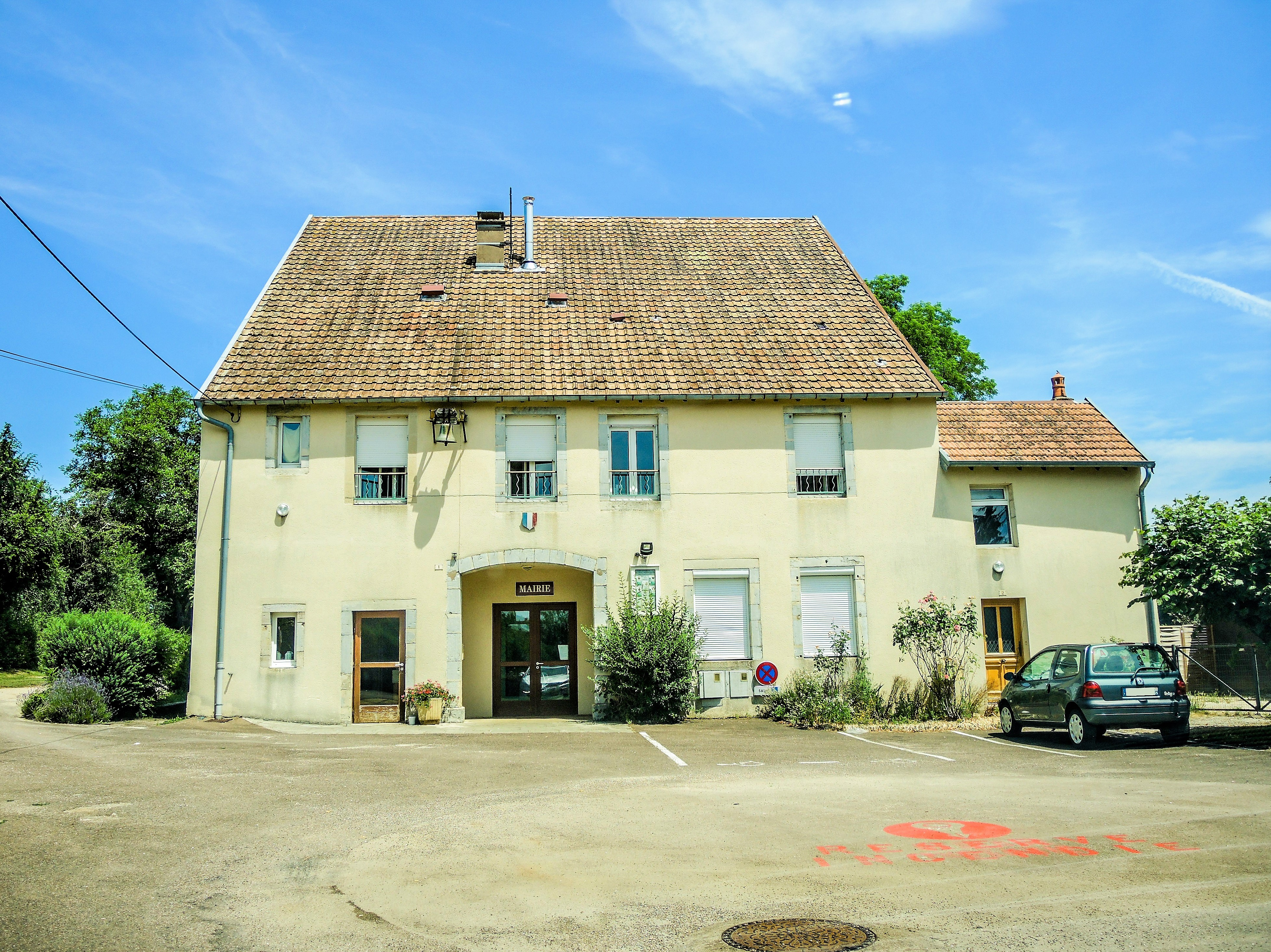
- The town hall in Traitiéfontaine
- Location of Traitiéfontaine
- Location within France Location within Bourgogne-Franche-Comté
- Coordinates: 47°24′57″N 6°05′27″E
- Country: France
- Region: Bourgogne-Franche-Comté
- Department: Haute-Saône
- Arrondissement: Vesoul
- Canton: Rioz

Government
  - Mayor (2020–2026): Michelle Bardey
- Area^{1}: 5.92 km^{2} (2.29 sq mi)
- Highest elevation: 331 m (1,086 ft)
- Lowest elevation: 238 m (781 ft)
- Population (2023): 160
  - Density: 27/km^{2} (70/sq mi)
- Time zone: UTC+01:00 (CET)
  - Summer (DST): UTC+02:00 (CEST)
- INSEE/Postal code: 70503 /70190
- ^{1} French Land Register data, which excludes lakes, ponds, glaciers > 1 km^{2} (0.386 sq mi or 247 acres) and river estuaries.

Traitiéfontaine (French pronunciation: [tʁɛtjefɔ̃tɛn]) is a commune in the Haute-Saône department in the region of Bourgogne-Franche-Comté in eastern France.

== See also ==
- Communes of the Haute-Saône department
