= Roche-sur-Linotte-et-Sorans-les-Cordiers =

- Commune
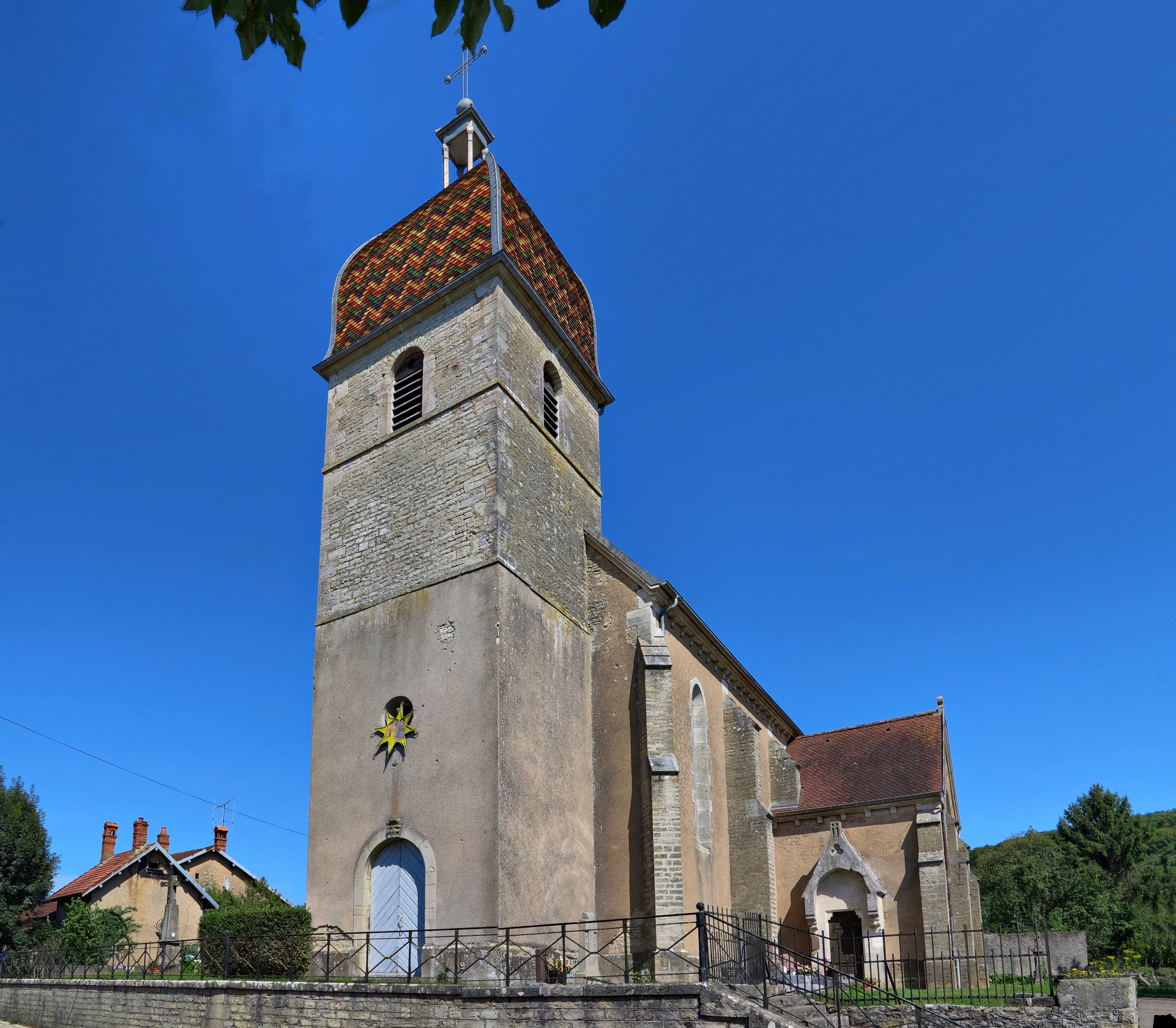
- The church in Roche-sur-Linotte
- Location of Roche-sur-Linotte-et-Sorans-les-Cordiers
- Location within France Location within Bourgogne-Franche-Comté
- Coordinates: 47°28′26″N 6°12′13″E
- Country: France
- Region: Bourgogne-Franche-Comté
- Department: Haute-Saône
- Arrondissement: Vesoul
- Canton: Rioz
- Area^{1}: 9.34 km^{2} (3.61 sq mi)
- Highest elevation: 373 m (1,224 ft)
- Lowest elevation: 240 m (790 ft)
- Population (2023): 71
  - Density: 7.6/km^{2} (20/sq mi)
- Time zone: UTC+01:00 (CET)
  - Summer (DST): UTC+02:00 (CEST)
- INSEE/Postal code: 70449 /70230
- ^{1} French Land Register data, which excludes lakes, ponds, glaciers > 1 km^{2} (0.386 sq mi or 247 acres) and river estuaries.

Roche-sur-Linotte-et-Sorans-les-Cordiers is a commune in the Haute-Saône department in the region of Bourgogne-Franche-Comté in eastern France.

== See also ==
- Communes of the Haute-Saône department
