= Cenans =

- Commune
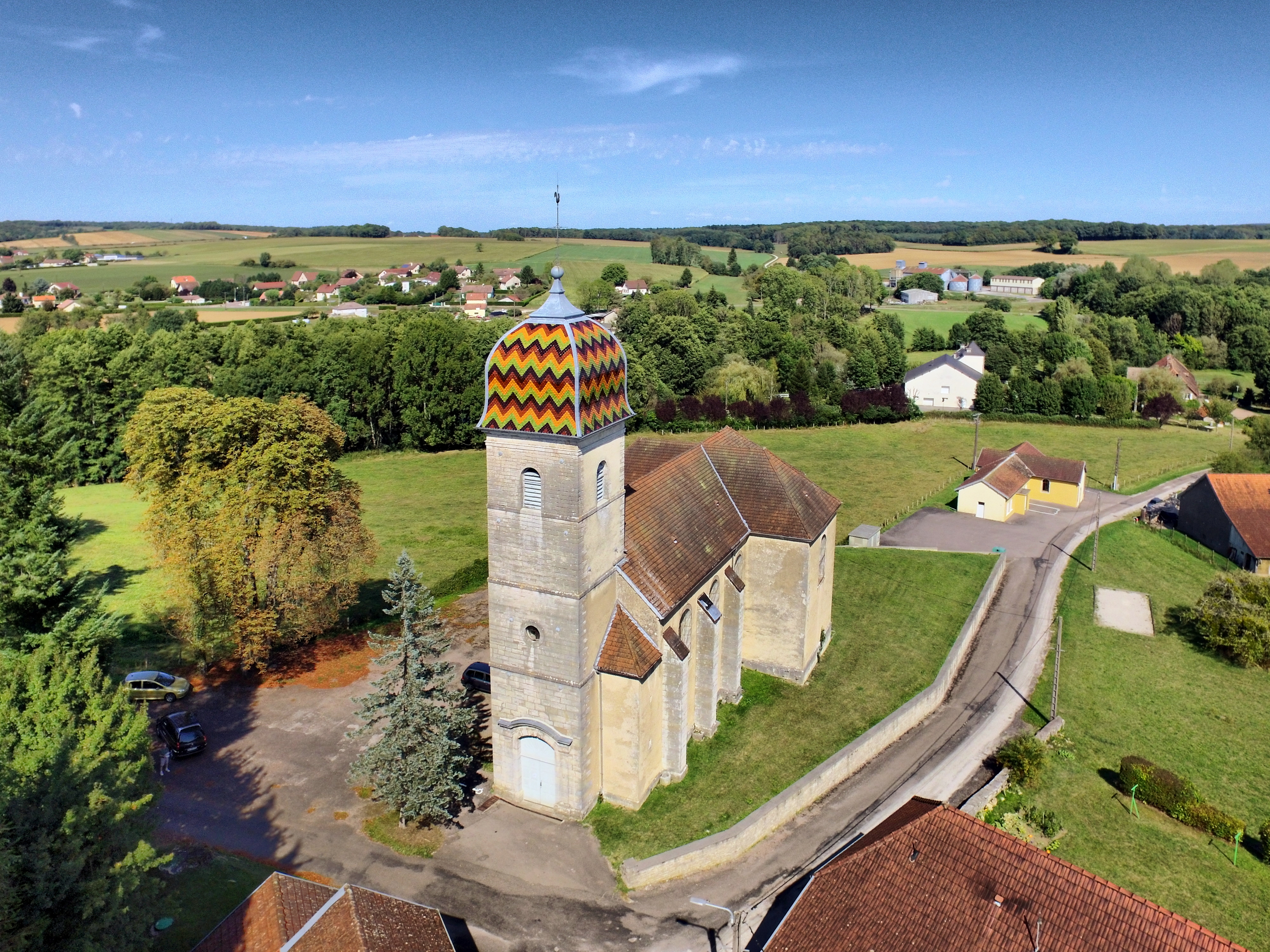
- The church in Cenans
- Location of Cenans
- Location within France Location within Bourgogne-Franche-Comté
- Coordinates: 47°25′56″N 6°11′48″E
- Country: France
- Region: Bourgogne-Franche-Comté
- Department: Haute-Saône
- Arrondissement: Vesoul
- Canton: Rioz

Government
  - Mayor (2020–2026): Étienne Mougin
- Area^{1}: 5.02 km^{2} (1.94 sq mi)
- Highest elevation: 293 m (961 ft)
- Lowest elevation: 232 m (761 ft)
- Population (2023): 133
  - Density: 26.5/km^{2} (68.6/sq mi)
- Time zone: UTC+01:00 (CET)
  - Summer (DST): UTC+02:00 (CEST)
- INSEE/Postal code: 70113 /70230
- ^{1} French Land Register data, which excludes lakes, ponds, glaciers > 1 km^{2} (0.386 sq mi or 247 acres) and river estuaries.

Cenans (French pronunciation: [sənɑ̃]) is a commune in the Haute-Saône department in the region of Bourgogne-Franche-Comté in eastern France.

== See also ==
- Communes of the Haute-Saône department
