= Boulot =

- Commune
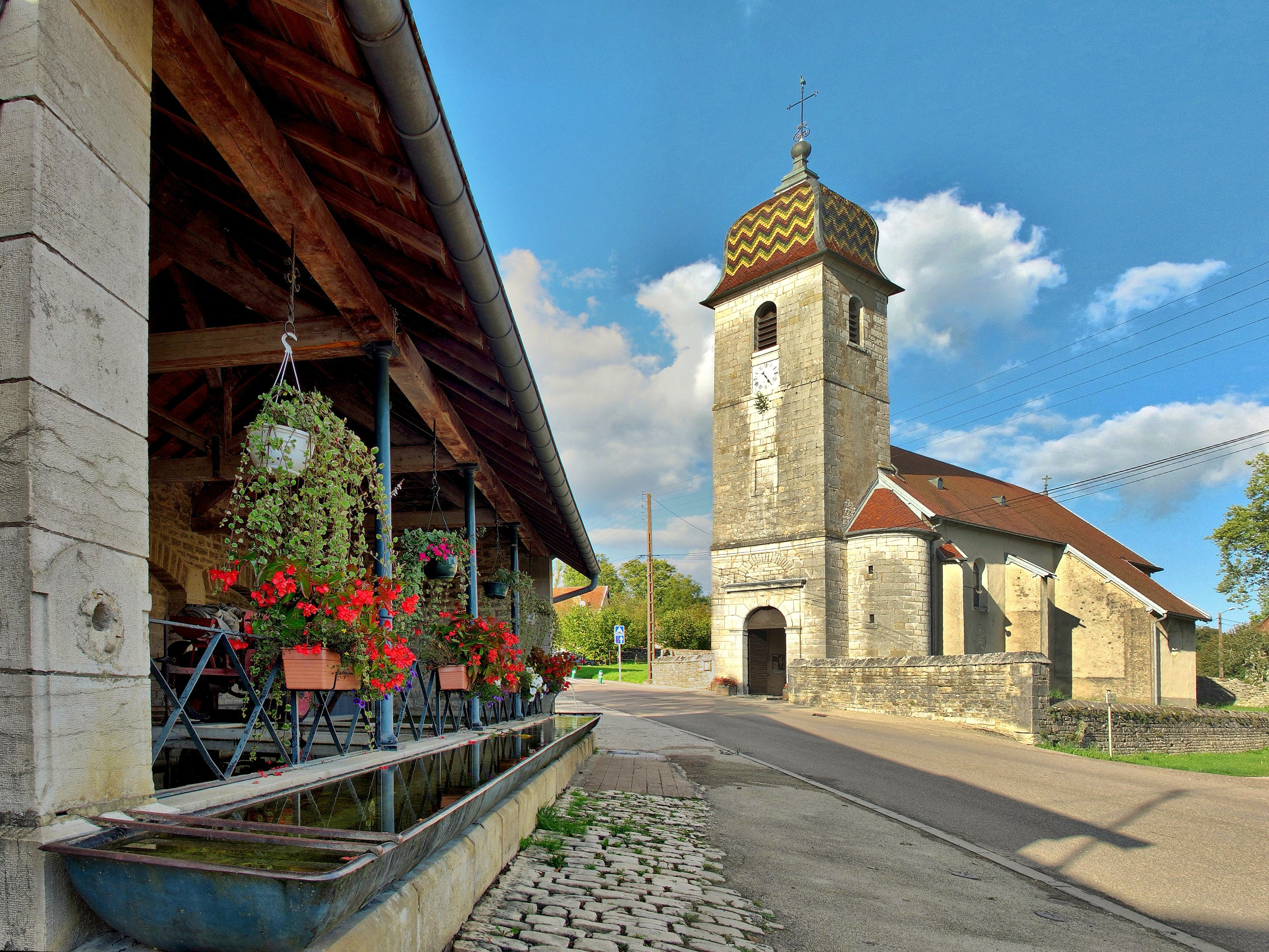
- The church and wash house in Boulot
- Location of Boulot
- Location within France Location within Bourgogne-Franche-Comté
- Coordinates: 47°20′55″N 5°57′39″E
- Country: France
- Region: Bourgogne-Franche-Comté
- Department: Haute-Saône
- Arrondissement: Vesoul
- Canton: Rioz

Government
  - Mayor (2020–2026): Claude Chevalier
- Area^{1}: 7.08 km^{2} (2.73 sq mi)
- Highest elevation: 287 m (942 ft)
- Lowest elevation: 209 m (686 ft)
- Population (2023): 645
  - Density: 91.1/km^{2} (236/sq mi)
- Time zone: UTC+01:00 (CET)
  - Summer (DST): UTC+02:00 (CEST)
- INSEE/Postal code: 70084 /70190
- ^{1} French Land Register data, which excludes lakes, ponds, glaciers > 1 km^{2} (0.386 sq mi or 247 acres) and river estuaries.

Boulot (French pronunciation: [bulo]) is a commune in the Haute-Saône department in the region of Bourgogne-Franche-Comté in eastern France. As of 2019, the population was 663.

== See also ==
- Communes of the Haute-Saône department
