= Bouhans-lès-Montbozon =

- Commune
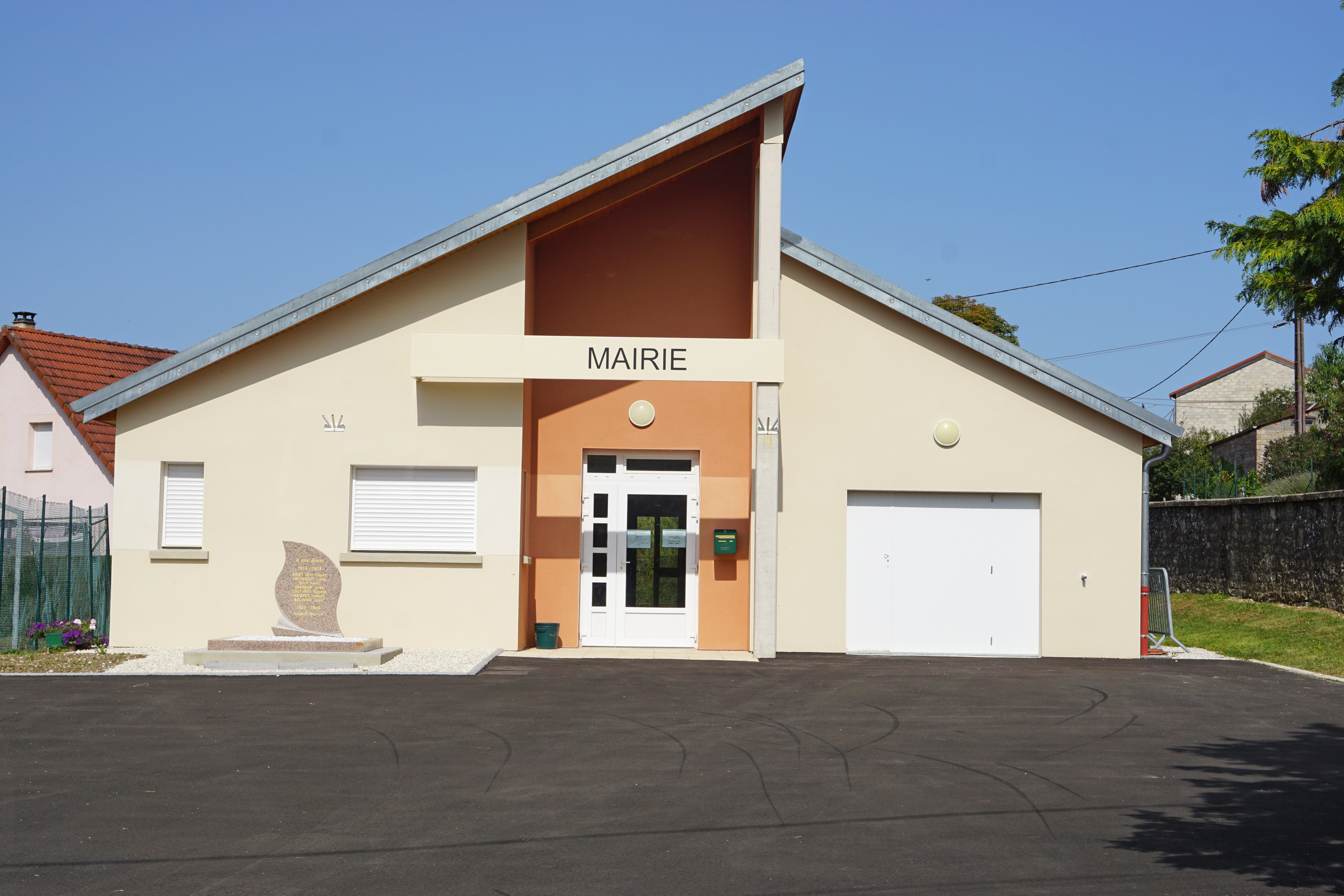
- The town hall in Bouhans-lès-Montbozon
- Location of Bouhans-lès-Montbozon
- Location within France Location within Bourgogne-Franche-Comté
- Coordinates: 47°29′01″N 6°17′10″E
- Country: France
- Region: Bourgogne-Franche-Comté
- Department: Haute-Saône
- Arrondissement: Vesoul
- Canton: Rioz

Government
  - Mayor (2020–2026): Serge Laurent
- Area^{1}: 5.15 km^{2} (1.99 sq mi)
- Highest elevation: 341 m (1,119 ft)
- Lowest elevation: 240 m (790 ft)
- Population (2023): 124
  - Density: 24.1/km^{2} (62.4/sq mi)
- Time zone: UTC+01:00 (CET)
  - Summer (DST): UTC+02:00 (CEST)
- INSEE/Postal code: 70082 /70230
- ^{1} French Land Register data, which excludes lakes, ponds, glaciers > 1 km^{2} (0.386 sq mi or 247 acres) and river estuaries.

Bouhans-lès-Montbozon (French pronunciation: [bu.ɑ̃ lɛ mɔ̃bozɔ̃]) is a commune in the Haute-Saône department in the region of Bourgogne-Franche-Comté in eastern France.

== See also ==
- Communes of the Haute-Saône department
