= Sorans-lès-Breurey =

- Commune
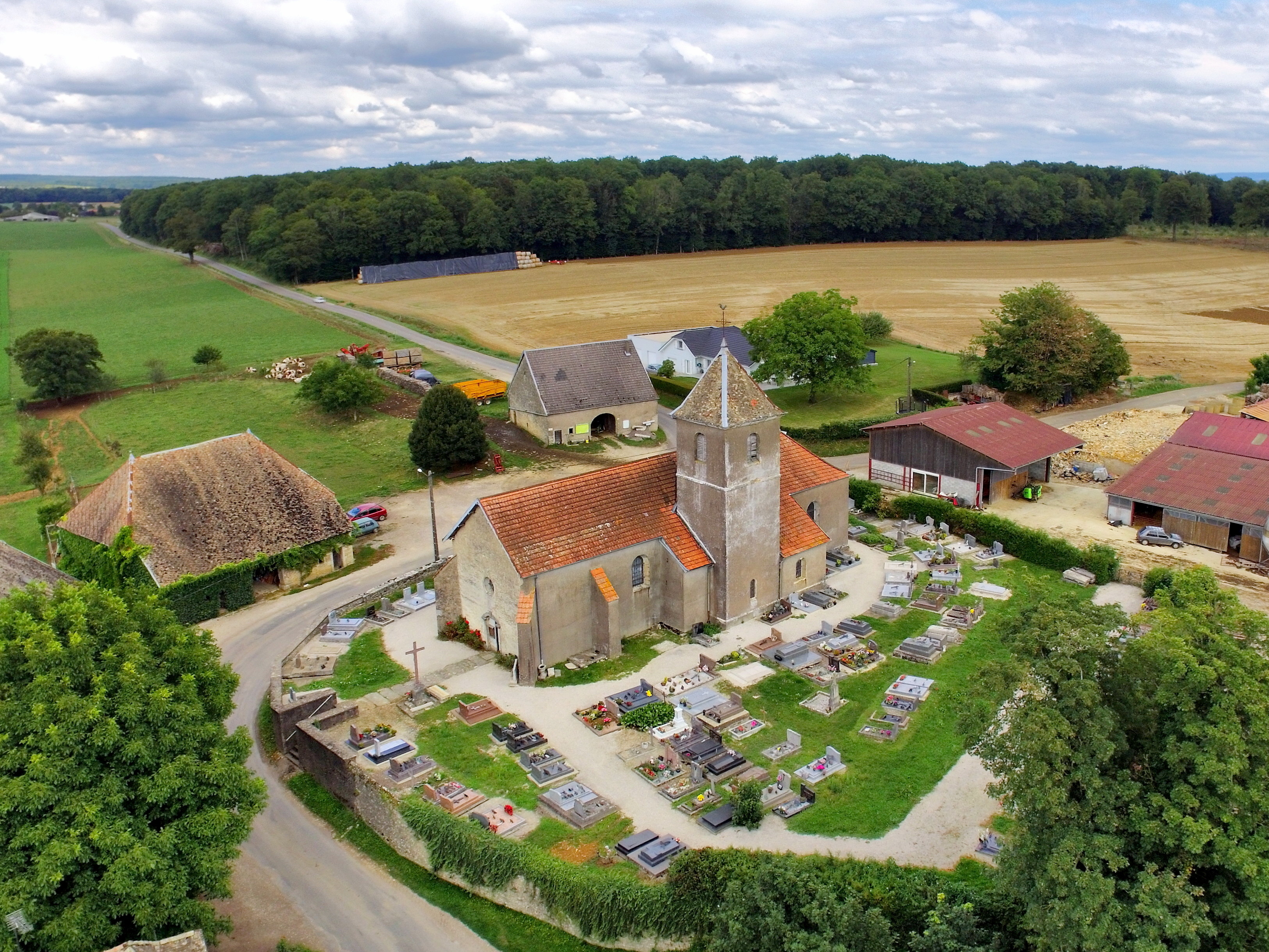
- The church in They-en-Sorans

- Coat of arms
- Location of Sorans-lès-Breurey
- Location within France Location within Bourgogne-Franche-Comté
- Coordinates: 47°23′52″N 6°03′06″E
- Country: France
- Region: Bourgogne-Franche-Comté
- Department: Haute-Saône
- Arrondissement: Vesoul
- Canton: Rioz

Government
  - Mayor (2020–2026): Jacques Marchal
- Area^{1}: 14.37 km^{2} (5.55 sq mi)
- Highest elevation: 363 m (1,191 ft)
- Lowest elevation: 221 m (725 ft)
- Population (2023): 419
  - Density: 29.2/km^{2} (75.5/sq mi)
- Time zone: UTC+01:00 (CET)
  - Summer (DST): UTC+02:00 (CEST)
- INSEE/Postal code: 70493 /70190
- ^{1} French Land Register data, which excludes lakes, ponds, glaciers > 1 km^{2} (0.386 sq mi or 247 acres) and river estuaries.

Sorans-lès-Breurey (French pronunciation: [sɔʁɑ̃ lɛ bʁœʁɛ], lit. 'Sorans near Breurey') is a commune in the Haute-Saône department in the region of Bourgogne-Franche-Comté in eastern France.

== See also ==
- Communes of the Haute-Saône department
