= Dampierre-sur-Linotte =

- Commune
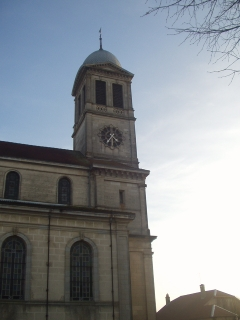
- The church in Dampierre-sur-Linotte

- Coat of arms
- Location of Dampierre-sur-Linotte
- Location within France Location within Bourgogne-Franche-Comté
- Coordinates: 47°30′44″N 6°13′59″E
- Country: France
- Region: Bourgogne-Franche-Comté
- Department: Haute-Saône
- Arrondissement: Vesoul
- Canton: Rioz

Government
  - Mayor (2020–2026): Frédéric Weber
- Area^{1}: 32.48 km^{2} (12.54 sq mi)
- Highest elevation: 393 m (1,289 ft)
- Lowest elevation: 252 m (827 ft)
- Population (2023): 753
  - Density: 23.2/km^{2} (60.0/sq mi)
- Time zone: UTC+01:00 (CET)
  - Summer (DST): UTC+02:00 (CEST)
- INSEE/Postal code: 70197 /70230
- ^{1} French Land Register data, which excludes lakes, ponds, glaciers > 1 km^{2} (0.386 sq mi or 247 acres) and river estuaries.

Dampierre-sur-Linotte (French pronunciation: [dɑ̃pjɛʁ syʁ linɔt]) is a commune in the Haute-Saône department in the region of Bourgogne-Franche-Comté in eastern France. In 1973 it absorbed two former communes: Presle and Trevey.

== See also ==
- Communes of the Haute-Saône department
