= Buthiers, Haute-Saône =

Buthiers
- Commune
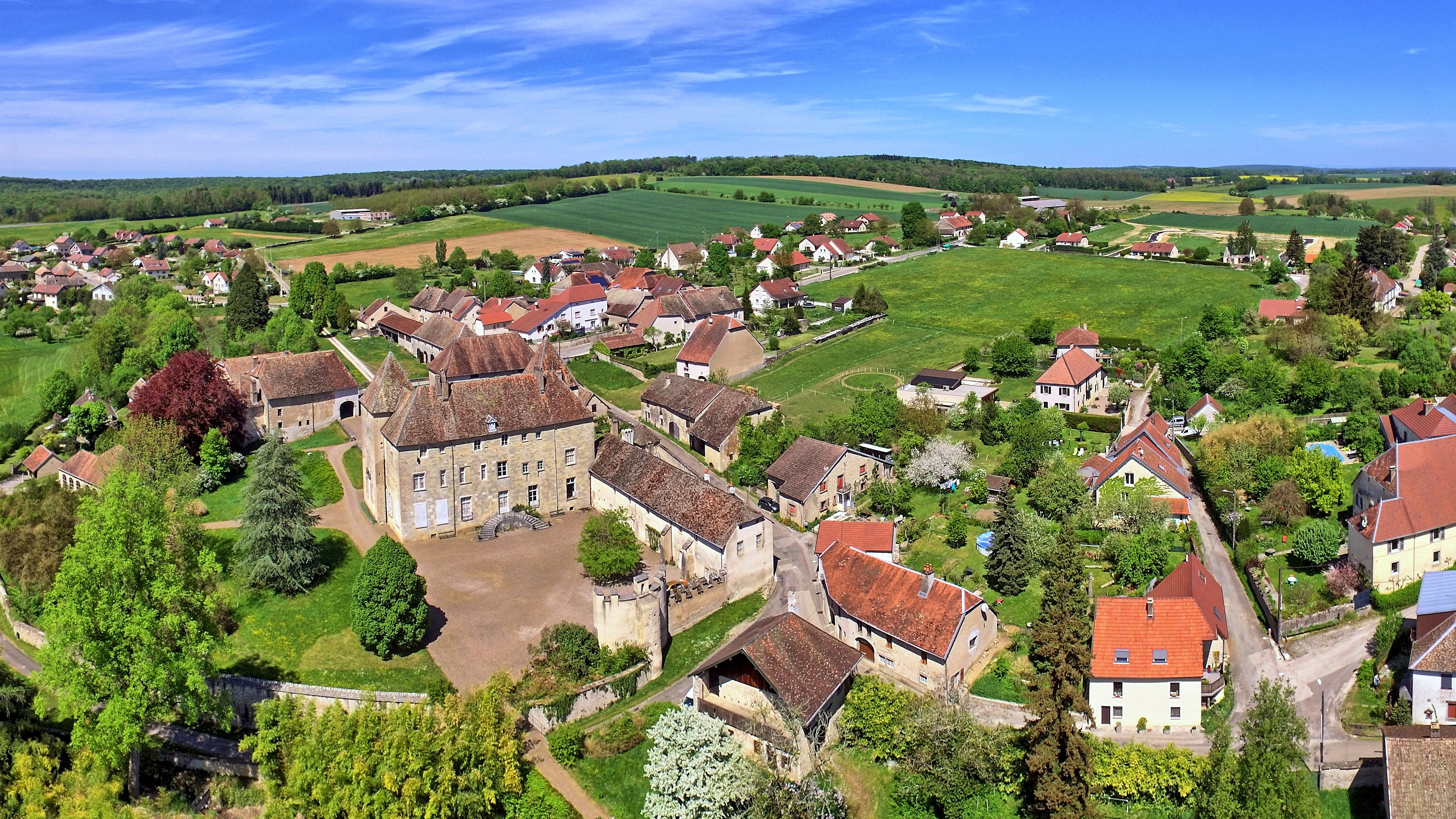
- The chateau and surroundings in Buthiers
- Location of Buthiers
- Location within France Location within Bourgogne-Franche-Comté
- Coordinates: 47°20′51″N 6°02′03″E
- Country: France
- Region: Bourgogne-Franche-Comté
- Department: Haute-Saône
- Arrondissement: Vesoul
- Canton: Rioz

Government
  - Mayor (2020–2026): Didier Magnin
- Area^{1}: 5.69 km^{2} (2.20 sq mi)
- Highest elevation: 310 m (1,020 ft)
- Lowest elevation: 214 m (702 ft)
- Population (2023): 336
  - Density: 59.1/km^{2} (153/sq mi)
- Time zone: UTC+01:00 (CET)
  - Summer (DST): UTC+02:00 (CEST)
- INSEE/Postal code: 70109 /70190
- ^{1} French Land Register data, which excludes lakes, ponds, glaciers > 1 km^{2} (0.386 sq mi or 247 acres) and river estuaries.

Buthiers (French pronunciation: [bytje]) is a commune in the Haute-Saône department in the region of Bourgogne-Franche-Comté in eastern France.

== See also ==
- Communes of the Haute-Saône department
