= Neuvelle-lès-Cromary =

- Commune
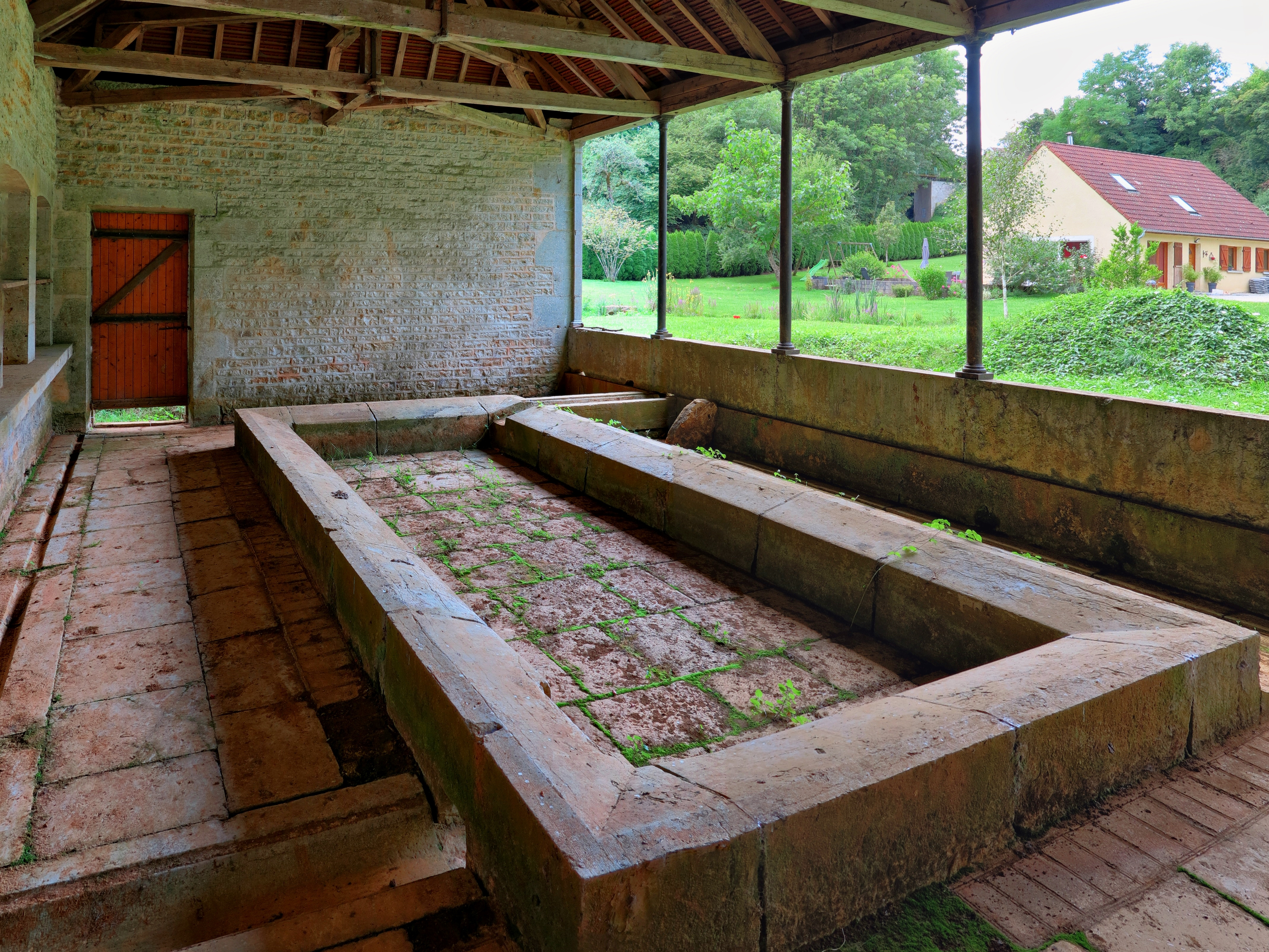
- The wash house in Neuvelle-lès-Cromary

- Coat of arms
- Location of Neuvelle-lès-Cromary
- Location within France Location within Bourgogne-Franche-Comté
- Coordinates: 47°23′44″N 6°04′33″E
- Country: France
- Region: Bourgogne-Franche-Comté
- Department: Haute-Saône
- Arrondissement: Vesoul
- Canton: Rioz

Government
  - Mayor (2020–2026): Claude Demoly
- Area^{1}: 6.29 km^{2} (2.43 sq mi)
- Highest elevation: 371 m (1,217 ft)
- Lowest elevation: 223 m (732 ft)
- Population (2023): 443
  - Density: 70.4/km^{2} (182/sq mi)
- Time zone: UTC+01:00 (CET)
  - Summer (DST): UTC+02:00 (CEST)
- INSEE/Postal code: 70383 /70190
- ^{1} French Land Register data, which excludes lakes, ponds, glaciers > 1 km^{2} (0.386 sq mi or 247 acres) and river estuaries.

Neuvelle-lès-Cromary (French pronunciation: [nøvɛl lɛ kʁɔmaʁi], literally Neuvelle near Cromary) is a commune in the Haute-Saône department in the region of Bourgogne-Franche-Comté in eastern France.

== See also ==
- Communes of the Haute-Saône department
