= Vellefaux =

- Commune
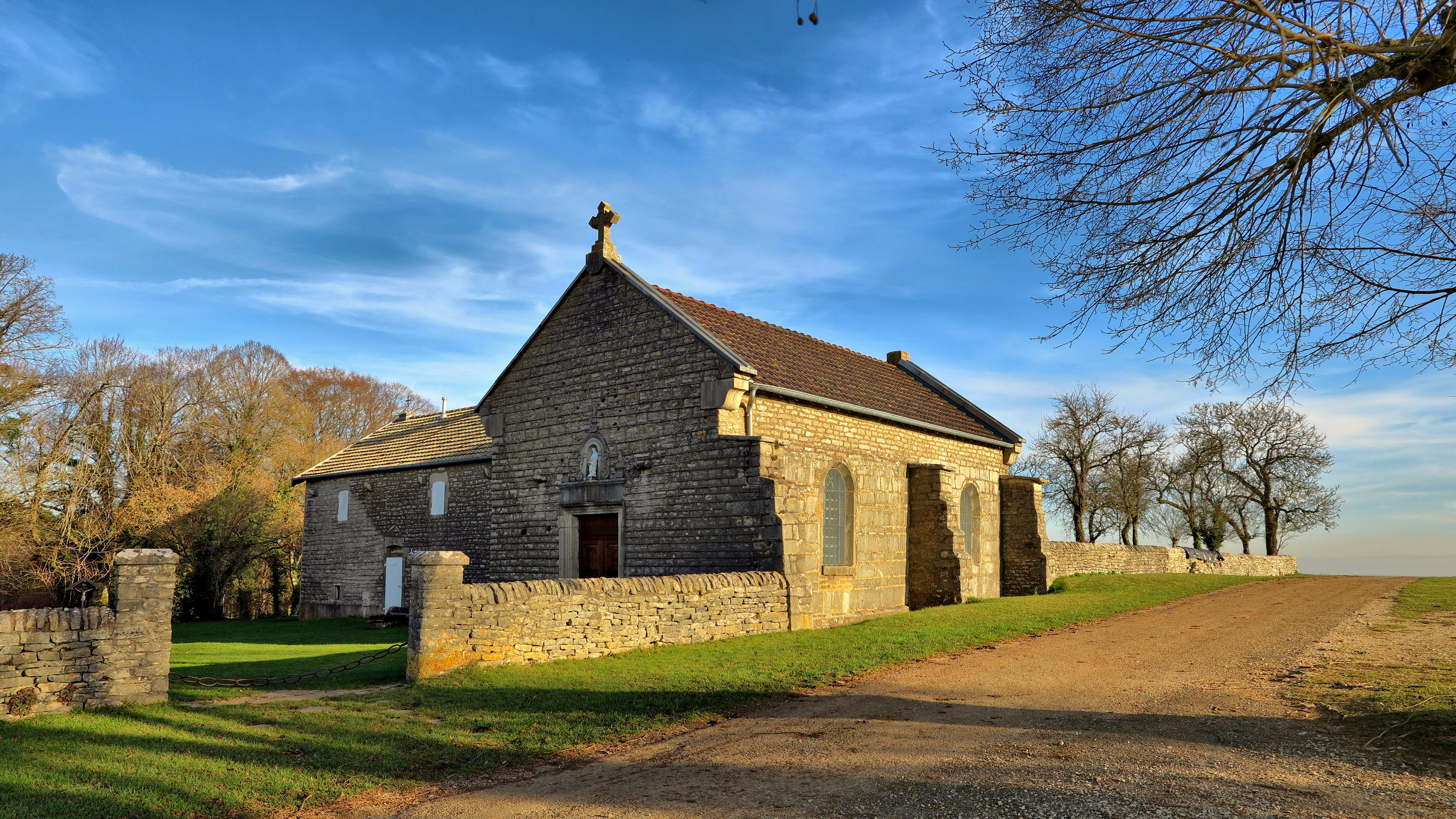
- The chapel in Vellefaux

- Coat of arms
- Location of Vellefaux
- Location within France Location within Bourgogne-Franche-Comté
- Coordinates: 47°33′13″N 6°08′20″E
- Country: France
- Region: Bourgogne-Franche-Comté
- Department: Haute-Saône
- Arrondissement: Vesoul
- Canton: Rioz

Government
  - Mayor (2020–2026): Didier Vitrey
- Area^{1}: 10.02 km^{2} (3.87 sq mi)
- Highest elevation: 426 m (1,398 ft)
- Lowest elevation: 305 m (1,001 ft)
- Population (2023): 539
  - Density: 53.8/km^{2} (139/sq mi)
- Time zone: UTC+01:00 (CET)
  - Summer (DST): UTC+02:00 (CEST)
- INSEE/Postal code: 70532 /70000
- ^{1} French Land Register data, which excludes lakes, ponds, glaciers > 1 km^{2} (0.386 sq mi or 247 acres) and river estuaries.

Vellefaux (French pronunciation: [vɛlfo]) is a commune in the Haute-Saône department in the region of Bourgogne-Franche-Comté in eastern France.

== See also ==
- Communes of the Haute-Saône department
