= Bussières, Haute-Saône =

Bussières
- Commune
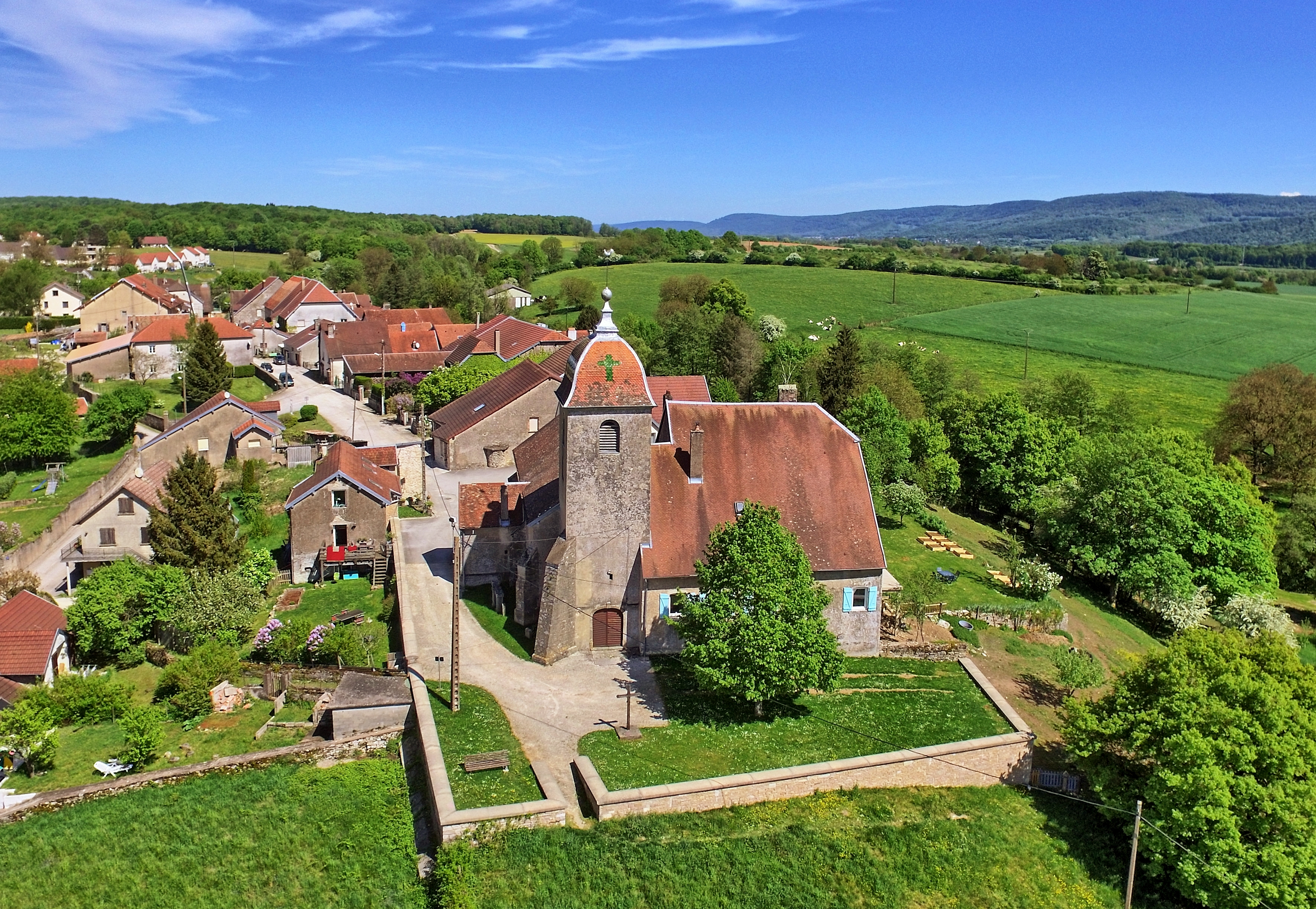
- The church in Bussières
- Location of Bussières
- Location within France Location within Bourgogne-Franche-Comté
- Coordinates: 47°20′18″N 5°58′29″E
- Country: France
- Region: Bourgogne-Franche-Comté
- Department: Haute-Saône
- Arrondissement: Vesoul
- Canton: Rioz

Government
  - Mayor (2020–2026): Émilien Brenot
- Area^{1}: 6.11 km^{2} (2.36 sq mi)
- Highest elevation: 306 m (1,004 ft)
- Lowest elevation: 210 m (690 ft)
- Population (2023): 427
  - Density: 69.9/km^{2} (181/sq mi)
- Time zone: UTC+01:00 (CET)
  - Summer (DST): UTC+02:00 (CEST)
- INSEE/Postal code: 70107 /70190
- ^{1} French Land Register data, which excludes lakes, ponds, glaciers > 1 km^{2} (0.386 sq mi or 247 acres) and river estuaries.

Bussières (French pronunciation: [bysjɛʁ]) is a commune in the Haute-Saône department in the region of Bourgogne-Franche-Comté in eastern France.

== See also ==
- Communes of the Haute-Saône department
