= Larians-et-Munans =

- Commune
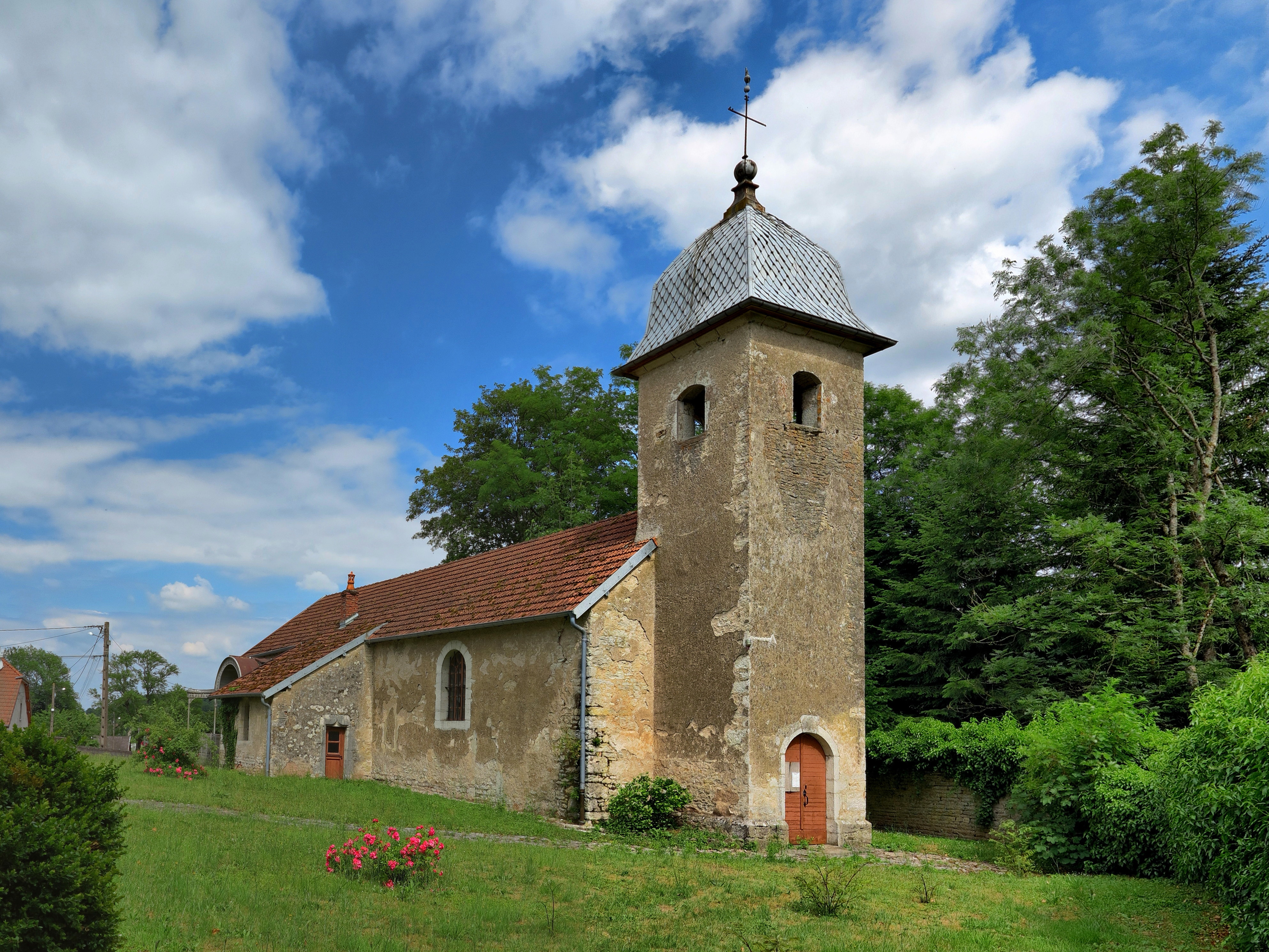
- The church in Larians
- Location of Larians-et-Munans
- Location within France Location within Bourgogne-Franche-Comté
- Coordinates: 47°25′00″N 6°14′11″E
- Country: France
- Region: Bourgogne-Franche-Comté
- Department: Haute-Saône
- Arrondissement: Vesoul
- Canton: Rioz

Government
  - Mayor (2020–2026): Serge Sadowski
- Area^{1}: 2.50 km^{2} (0.97 sq mi)
- Highest elevation: 273 m (896 ft)
- Lowest elevation: 231 m (758 ft)
- Population (2023): 291
  - Density: 116/km^{2} (301/sq mi)
- Time zone: UTC+01:00 (CET)
  - Summer (DST): UTC+02:00 (CEST)
- INSEE/Postal code: 70296 /70230
- ^{1} French Land Register data, which excludes lakes, ponds, glaciers > 1 km^{2} (0.386 sq mi or 247 acres) and river estuaries.

Larians-et-Munans (French pronunciation: [laʁjɑ̃ e mynɑ̃]) is a commune in the Haute-Saône department in the region of Bourgogne-Franche-Comté in eastern France.

== See also ==
- Communes of the Haute-Saône department
