= Perrouse =

- Commune
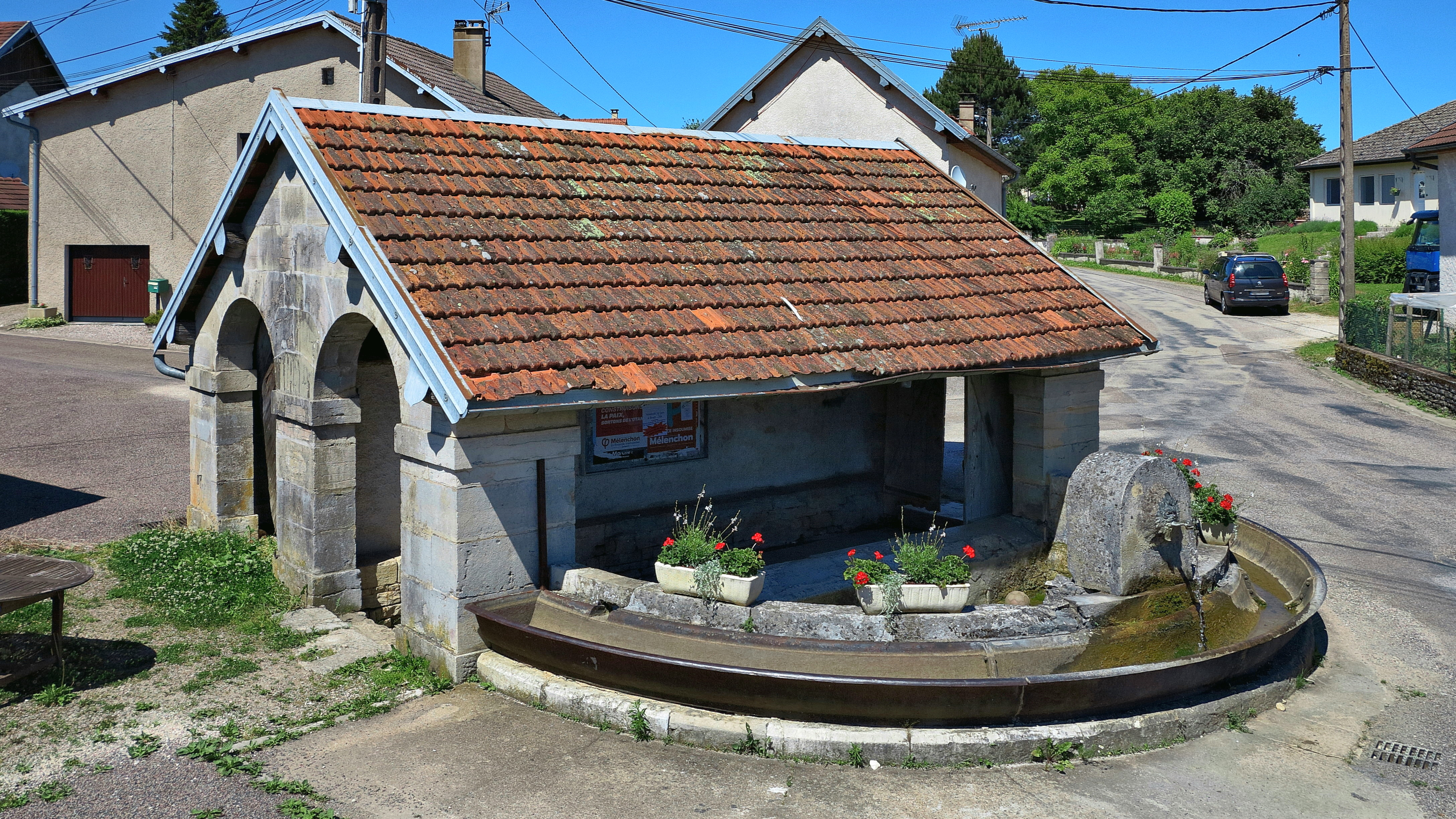
- The wash house in Perrouse

- Coat of arms
- Location of Perrouse
- Location within France Location within Bourgogne-Franche-Comté
- Coordinates: 47°21′45″N 6°03′07″E
- Country: France
- Region: Bourgogne-Franche-Comté
- Department: Haute-Saône
- Arrondissement: Vesoul
- Canton: Rioz

Government
  - Mayor (2024–2026): Jean-Marie Henriot
- Area^{1}: 4.39 km^{2} (1.69 sq mi)
- Highest elevation: 327 m (1,073 ft)
- Lowest elevation: 217 m (712 ft)
- Population (2023): 277
  - Density: 63.1/km^{2} (163/sq mi)
- Time zone: UTC+01:00 (CET)
  - Summer (DST): UTC+02:00 (CEST)
- INSEE/Postal code: 70407 /70190
- ^{1} French Land Register data, which excludes lakes, ponds, glaciers > 1 km^{2} (0.386 sq mi or 247 acres) and river estuaries.

Perrouse (French pronunciation: [pɛʁuz]) is a commune in the Haute-Saône department in the region of Bourgogne-Franche-Comté in eastern France.

== See also ==
- Communes of the Haute-Saône department
