= Boult, Haute-Saône =

Boult
- Commune
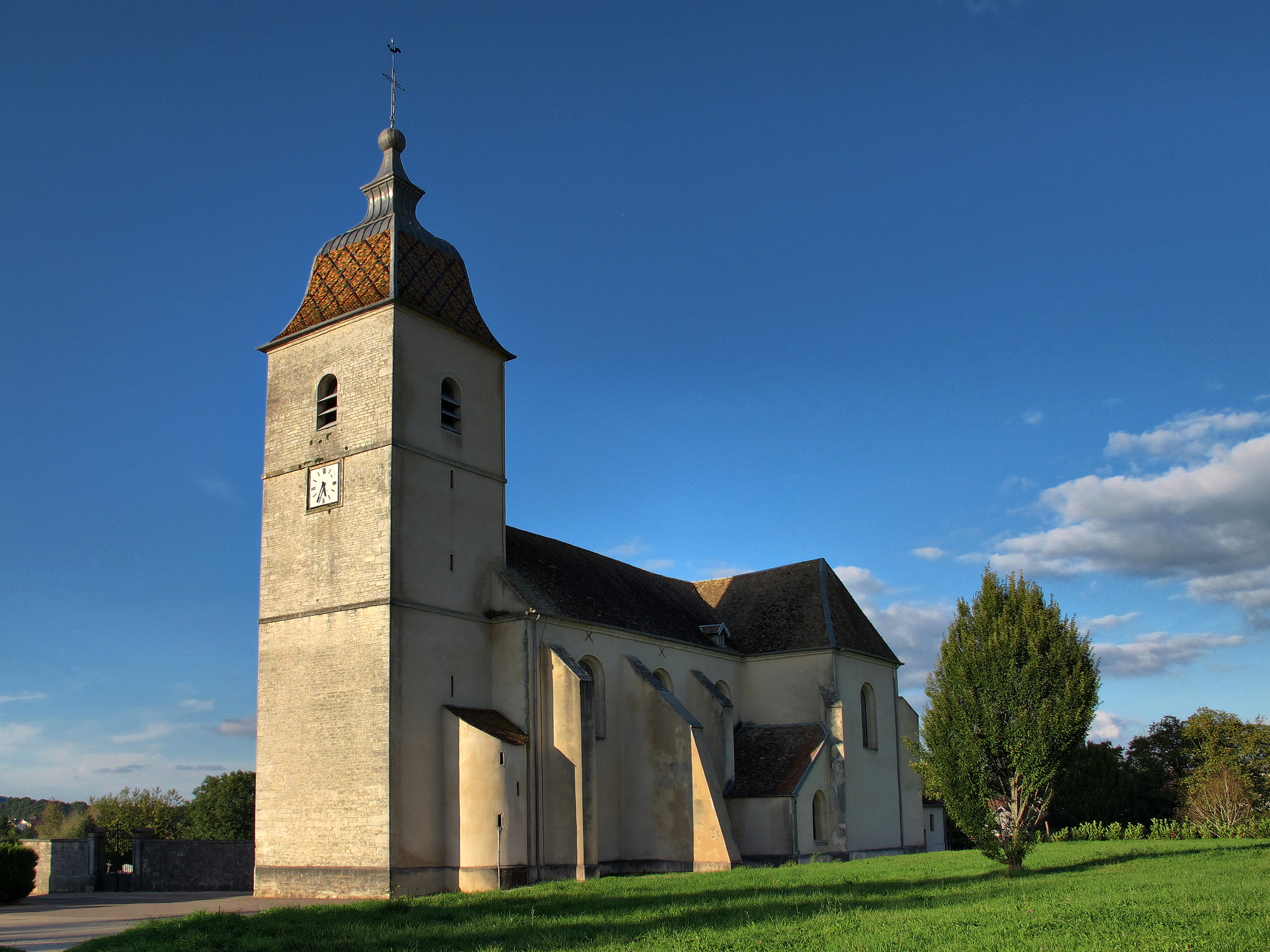
- The church in Boult
- Location of Boult
- Location within France Location within Bourgogne-Franche-Comté
- Coordinates: 47°22′56″N 6°00′09″E
- Country: France
- Region: Bourgogne-Franche-Comté
- Department: Haute-Saône
- Arrondissement: Vesoul
- Canton: Rioz
- Area^{1}: 14.62 km^{2} (5.64 sq mi)
- Highest elevation: 351 m (1,152 ft)
- Lowest elevation: 217 m (712 ft)
- Population (2023): 703
  - Density: 48.1/km^{2} (125/sq mi)
- Time zone: UTC+01:00 (CET)
  - Summer (DST): UTC+02:00 (CEST)
- INSEE/Postal code: 70085 /70190
- ^{1} French Land Register data, which excludes lakes, ponds, glaciers > 1 km^{2} (0.386 sq mi or 247 acres) and river estuaries.

Boult is a commune in the Haute-Saône department in the region of Bourgogne-Franche-Comté in eastern France.

== See also ==
- Communes of the Haute-Saône department
