= Fondremand =

- Commune
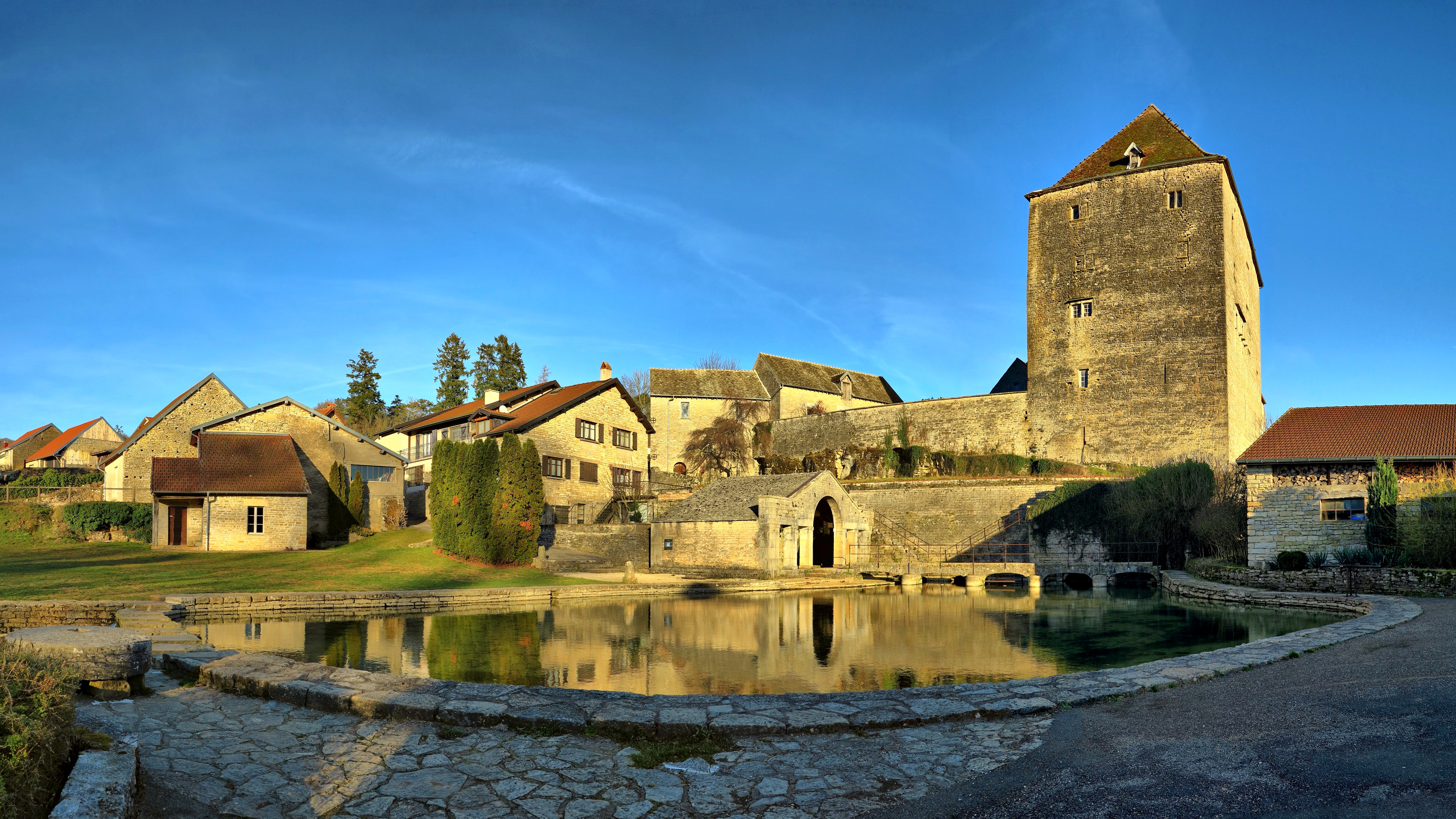
- The chateau and source of the Romaine river in Fondremand

- Coat of arms
- Location of Fondremand
- Location within France Location within Bourgogne-Franche-Comté
- Coordinates: 47°28′32″N 6°01′38″E
- Country: France
- Region: Bourgogne-Franche-Comté
- Department: Haute-Saône
- Arrondissement: Vesoul
- Canton: Rioz

Government
  - Mayor (2020–2026): Jean-Charles Hanriot
- Area^{1}: 16.43 km^{2} (6.34 sq mi)
- Highest elevation: 431 m (1,414 ft)
- Lowest elevation: 254 m (833 ft)
- Population (2023): 205
  - Density: 12.5/km^{2} (32.3/sq mi)
- Time zone: UTC+01:00 (CET)
  - Summer (DST): UTC+02:00 (CEST)
- INSEE/Postal code: 70239 /70190
- ^{1} French Land Register data, which excludes lakes, ponds, glaciers > 1 km^{2} (0.386 sq mi or 247 acres) and river estuaries.

Fondremand (French pronunciation: [fɔ̃dʁəmɑ̃]) is a commune in the Haute-Saône department in the region of Bourgogne-Franche-Comté in eastern France.

== See also ==
- Communes of the Haute-Saône department
