= Besnans =

- Commune
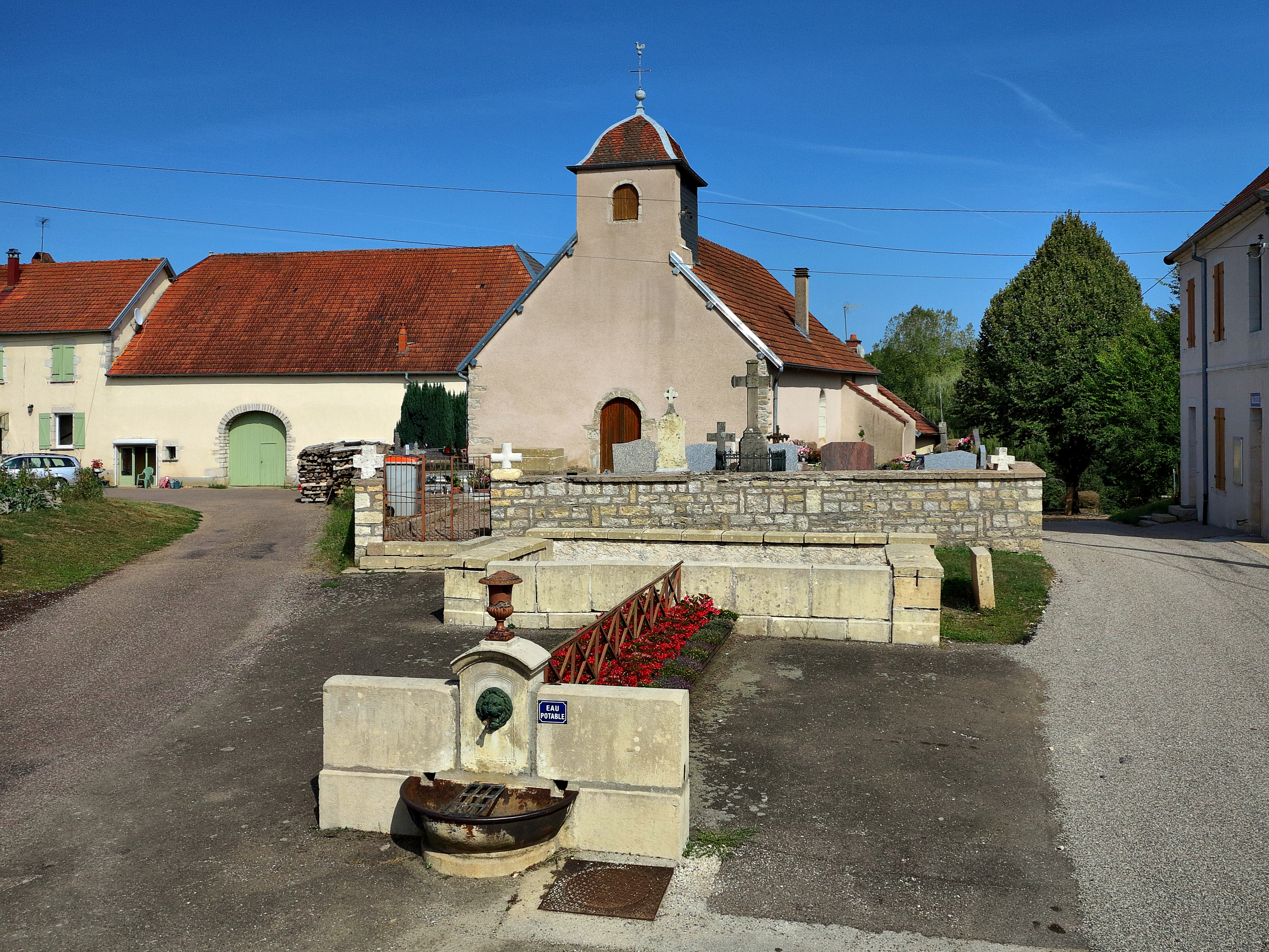
- The church in Besnans
- Location of Besnans
- Location within France Location within Bourgogne-Franche-Comté
- Coordinates: 47°27′06″N 6°15′36″E
- Country: France
- Region: Bourgogne-Franche-Comté
- Department: Haute-Saône
- Arrondissement: Vesoul
- Canton: Rioz
- Area^{1}: 2.94 km^{2} (1.14 sq mi)
- Highest elevation: 308 m (1,010 ft)
- Lowest elevation: 237 m (778 ft)
- Population (2023): 75
  - Density: 26/km^{2} (66/sq mi)
- Time zone: UTC+01:00 (CET)
  - Summer (DST): UTC+02:00 (CEST)
- INSEE/Postal code: 70065 /70230
- ^{1} French Land Register data, which excludes lakes, ponds, glaciers > 1 km^{2} (0.386 sq mi or 247 acres) and river estuaries.

Besnans is a commune in the Haute-Saône department in the region of Bourgogne-Franche-Comté in eastern France.

== See also ==
- Communes of the Haute-Saône department
