= Aulx-lès-Cromary =

- Commune
- Location of Aulx-lès-Cromary
- Location within France Location within Bourgogne-Franche-Comté
- Coordinates: 47°22′29″N 6°06′39″E
- Country: France
- Region: Bourgogne-Franche-Comté
- Department: Haute-Saône
- Arrondissement: Vesoul
- Canton: Rioz
- Intercommunality: CC Pays Riolais

Government
  - Mayor (2020–2026): Jean-Paul Russy
- Area^{1}: 4.33 km^{2} (1.67 sq mi)
- Highest elevation: 273 m (896 ft)
- Lowest elevation: 217 m (712 ft)
- Population (2023): 160
  - Density: 37/km^{2} (96/sq mi)
- Time zone: UTC+01:00 (CET)
  - Summer (DST): UTC+02:00 (CEST)
- INSEE/Postal code: 70036 /70190
- ^{1} French Land Register data, which excludes lakes, ponds, glaciers > 1 km^{2} (0.386 sq mi or 247 acres) and river estuaries.

Aulx-lès-Cromary is a commune in the Haute-Saône department in the region of Bourgogne-Franche-Comté in eastern France.

== See also ==
- Communes of the Haute-Saône department
