= Canton of Rioz =

Coordinates: 47.43°N 6.07°E

The canton of Rioz is an administrative division of the Haute-Saône department, northeastern France. Its borders were modified at the French canton reorganisation which came into effect in March 2015. Its seat is in Rioz.

It consists of the following communes:

1. Aulx-lès-Cromary
2. Authoison
3. La Barre
4. Beaumotte-Aubertans
5. Besnans
6. Bouhans-lès-Montbozon
7. Boulot
8. Boult
9. Bussières
10. Buthiers
11. Cenans
12. Chambornay-lès-Bellevaux
13. Chassey-lès-Montbozon
14. Chaux-la-Lotière
15. Cirey
16. Cognières
17. Cordonnet
18. Cromary
19. Dampierre-sur-Linotte
20. Échenoz-le-Sec
21. Filain
22. Fondremand
23. Fontenois-lès-Montbozon
24. Hyet
25. Larians-et-Munans
26. Loulans-Verchamp
27. Le Magnoray
28. Maizières
29. La Malachère
30. Maussans
31. Montarlot-lès-Rioz
32. Montbozon
33. Neuvelle-lès-Cromary
34. Ormenans
35. Pennesières
36. Perrouse
37. Quenoche
38. Recologne-lès-Rioz
39. Rioz
40. Roche-sur-Linotte-et-Sorans-les-Cordiers
41. Ruhans
42. Sorans-lès-Breurey
43. Thieffrans
44. Thiénans
45. Traitiéfontaine
46. Trésilley
47. Vandelans
48. Vellefaux
49. Villers-Bouton
50. Villers-Pater
51. Voray-sur-l'Ognon
52. Vy-lès-Filain
