= La Malachère =

- Commune
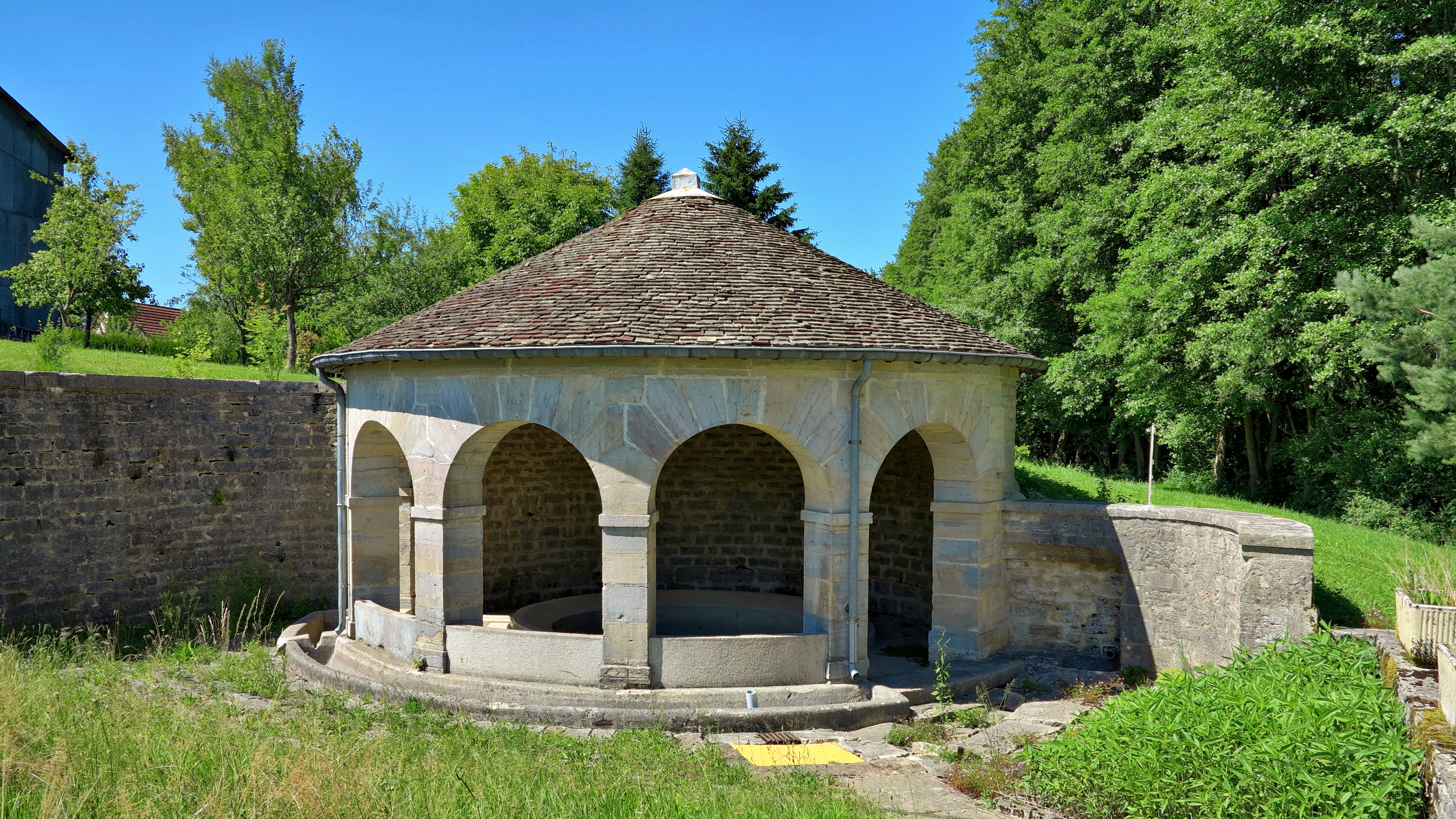
- The wash house in La Malachère

- Coat of arms
- Location of La Malachère
- Location within France Location within Bourgogne-Franche-Comté
- Coordinates: 47°27′06″N 6°04′28″E
- Country: France
- Region: Bourgogne-Franche-Comté
- Department: Haute-Saône
- Arrondissement: Vesoul
- Canton: Rioz

Government
  - Mayor (2020–2026): Claude Girard
- Area^{1}: 5.46 km^{2} (2.11 sq mi)
- Highest elevation: 380 m (1,250 ft)
- Lowest elevation: 269 m (883 ft)
- Population (2023): 297
  - Density: 54.4/km^{2} (141/sq mi)
- Time zone: UTC+01:00 (CET)
  - Summer (DST): UTC+02:00 (CEST)
- INSEE/Postal code: 70326 /70190
- ^{1} French Land Register data, which excludes lakes, ponds, glaciers > 1 km^{2} (0.386 sq mi or 247 acres) and river estuaries.

La Malachère (French pronunciation: [la malaʃɛʁ]) is a commune in the Haute-Saône department in the region of Bourgogne-Franche-Comté in eastern France.

== See also ==
- Communes of the Haute-Saône department
