= Hyet =

- Commune
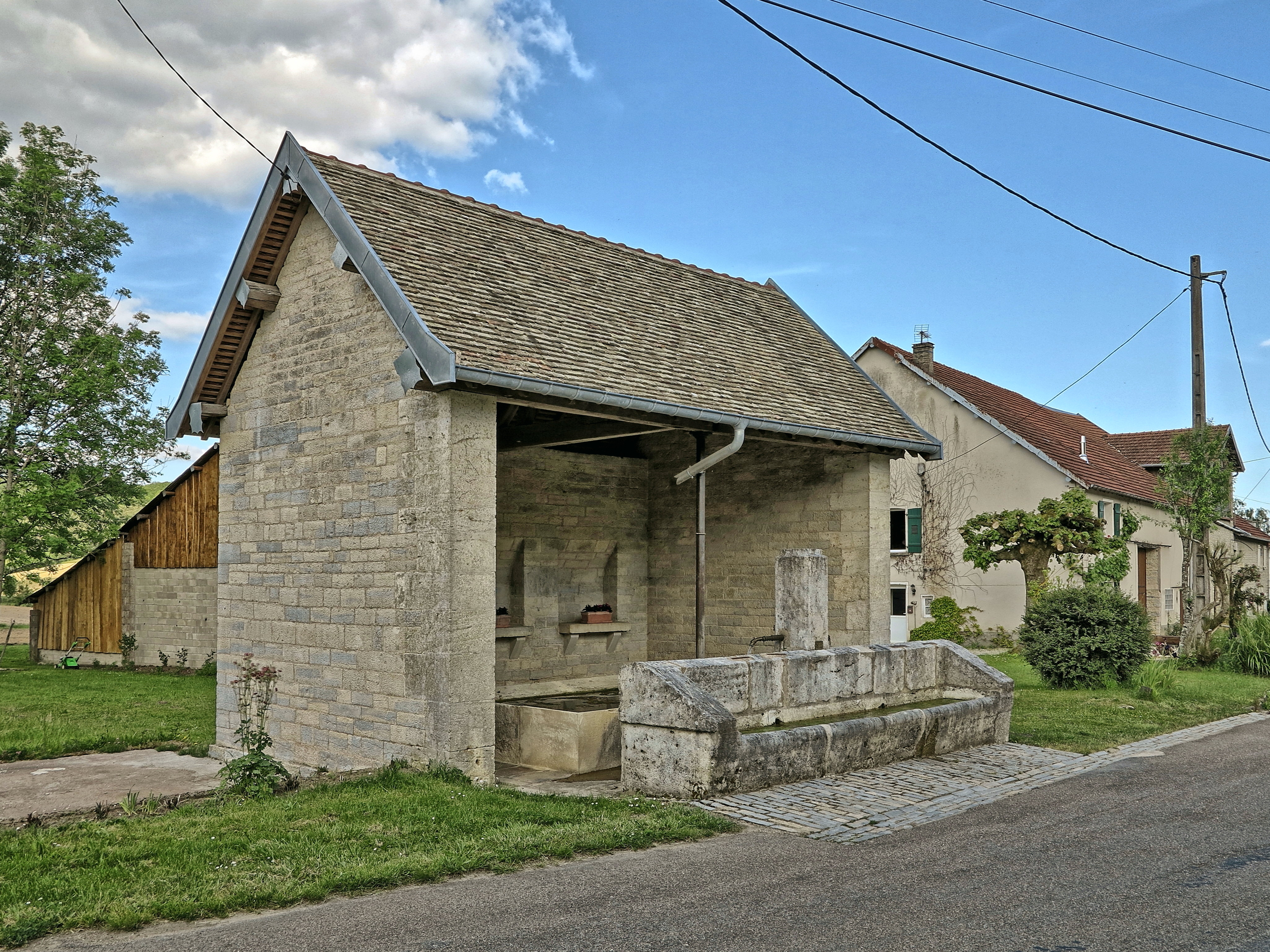
- The wash house in Hyet
- Location of Hyet
- Location within France Location within Bourgogne-Franche-Comté
- Coordinates: 47°28′30″N 6°05′45″E
- Country: France
- Region: Bourgogne-Franche-Comté
- Department: Haute-Saône
- Arrondissement: Vesoul
- Canton: Rioz

Government
  - Mayor (2020–2026): Jean-Pierre Oudin
- Area^{1}: 6.47 km^{2} (2.50 sq mi)
- Highest elevation: 417 m (1,368 ft)
- Lowest elevation: 267 m (876 ft)
- Population (2023): 118
  - Density: 18.2/km^{2} (47.2/sq mi)
- Time zone: UTC+01:00 (CET)
  - Summer (DST): UTC+02:00 (CEST)
- INSEE/Postal code: 70288 /70190
- ^{1} French Land Register data, which excludes lakes, ponds, glaciers > 1 km^{2} (0.386 sq mi or 247 acres) and river estuaries.

Hyet (French pronunciation: [jɛ]) is a commune in the Haute-Saône department in the region of Bourgogne-Franche-Comté in eastern France.

== See also ==
- Communes of the Haute-Saône department
