= Ormenans =

- Commune
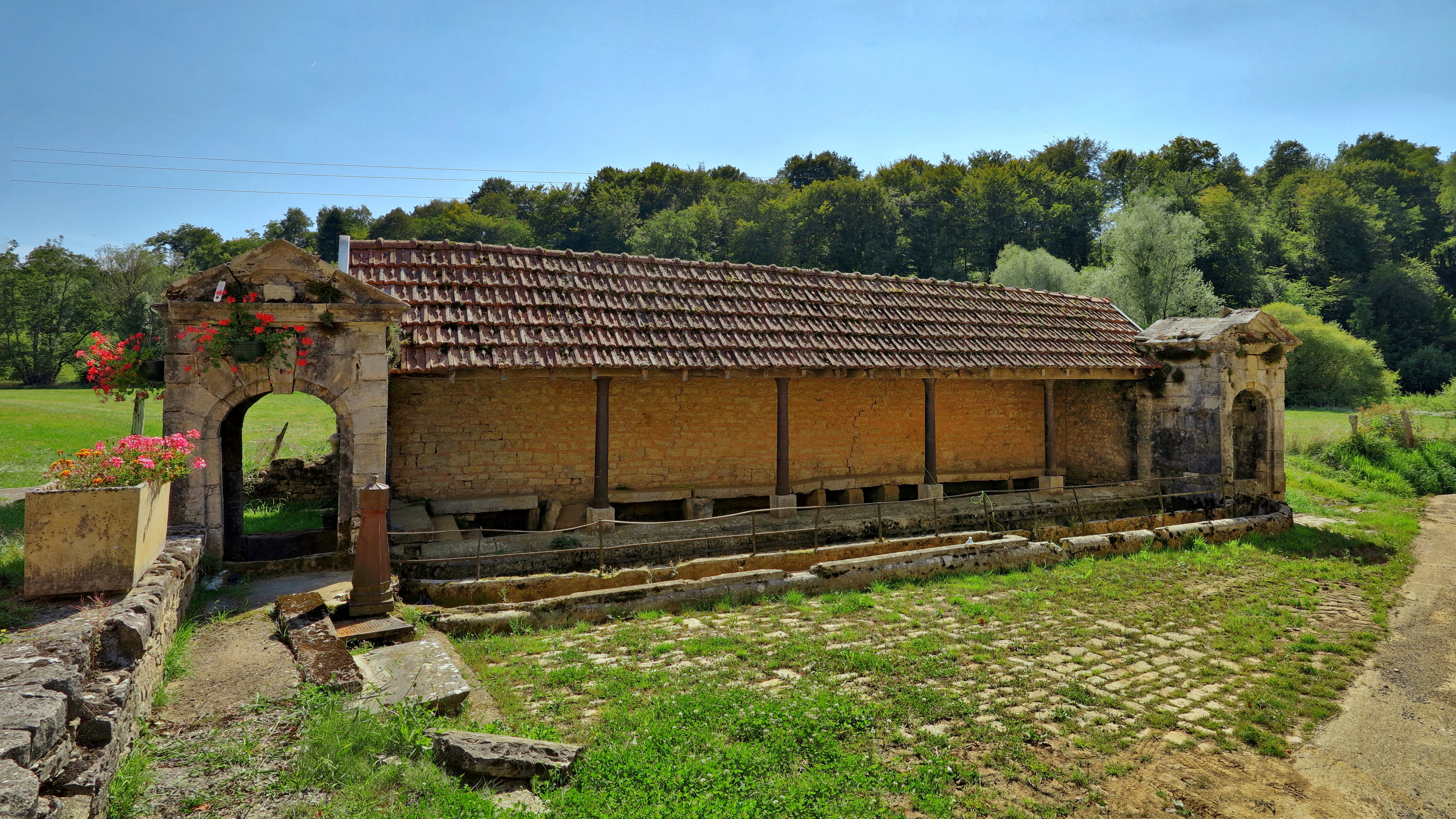
- The wash house in Ormenans

- Coat of arms
- Location of Ormenans
- Location within France Location within Bourgogne-Franche-Comté
- Coordinates: 47°27′12″N 6°12′21″E
- Country: France
- Region: Bourgogne-Franche-Comté
- Department: Haute-Saône
- Arrondissement: Vesoul
- Canton: Rioz

Government
  - Mayor (2020–2026): Jean-Paul Rivière
- Area^{1}: 3.61 km^{2} (1.39 sq mi)
- Highest elevation: 342 m (1,122 ft)
- Lowest elevation: 237 m (778 ft)
- Population (2023): 84
  - Density: 23/km^{2} (60/sq mi)
- Time zone: UTC+01:00 (CET)
  - Summer (DST): UTC+02:00 (CEST)
- INSEE/Postal code: 70397 /70230
- ^{1} French Land Register data, which excludes lakes, ponds, glaciers > 1 km^{2} (0.386 sq mi or 247 acres) and river estuaries.

Ormenans (French pronunciation: [ɔʁmənɑ̃]) is a commune in the Haute-Saône department in the region of Bourgogne-Franche-Comté in eastern France.

== See also ==
- Communes of the Haute-Saône department
