= Pennesières =

- Commune
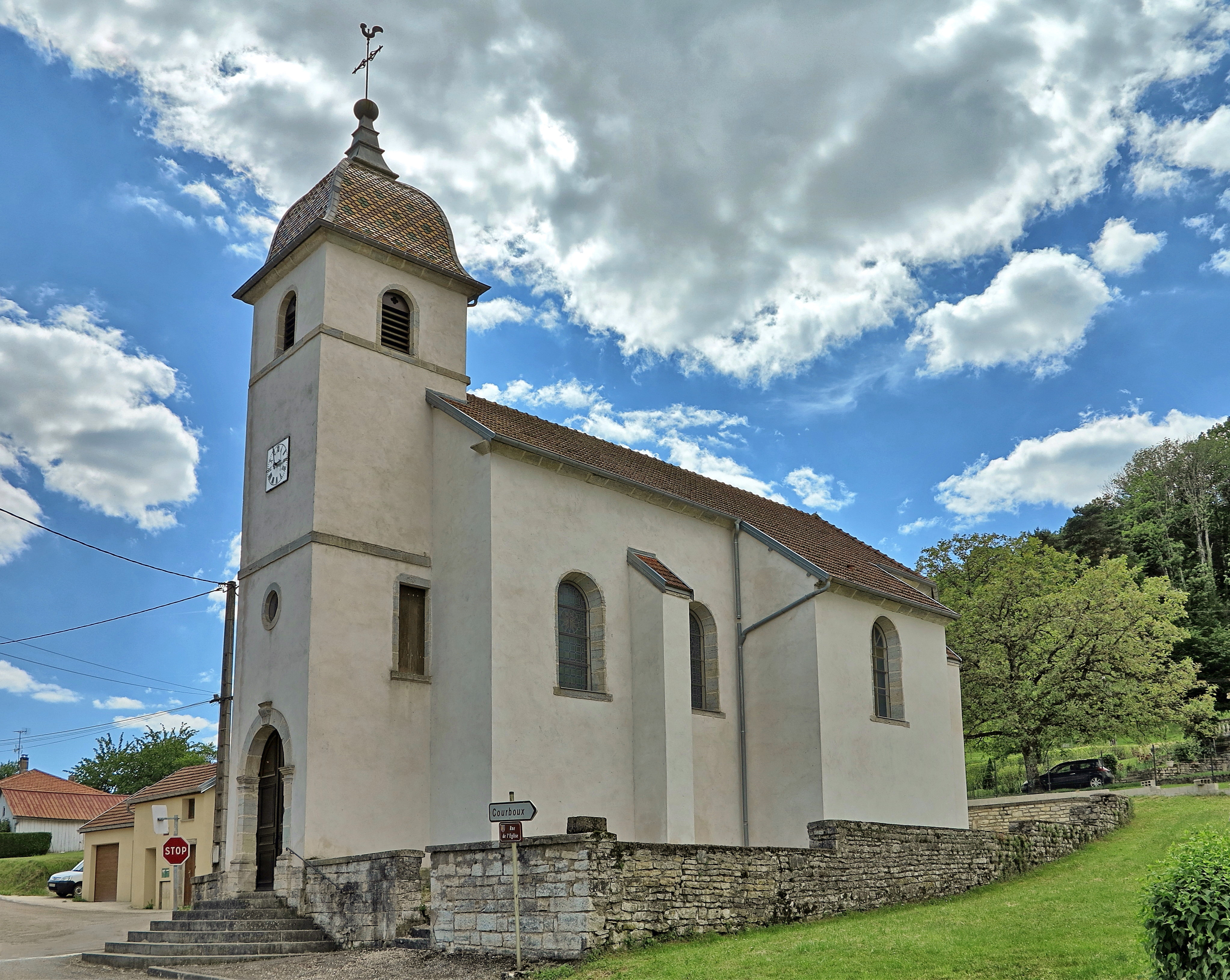
- The church in Pennesières

- Coat of arms
- Location of Pennesières
- Location within France Location within Bourgogne-Franche-Comté
- Coordinates: 47°29′09″N 6°05′54″E
- Country: France
- Region: Bourgogne-Franche-Comté
- Department: Haute-Saône
- Arrondissement: Vesoul
- Canton: Rioz
- Area^{1}: 9.07 km^{2} (3.50 sq mi)
- Highest elevation: 411 m (1,348 ft)
- Lowest elevation: 273 m (896 ft)
- Population (2023): 192
  - Density: 21.2/km^{2} (54.8/sq mi)
- Time zone: UTC+01:00 (CET)
  - Summer (DST): UTC+02:00 (CEST)
- INSEE/Postal code: 70405 /70190
- ^{1} French Land Register data, which excludes lakes, ponds, glaciers > 1 km^{2} (0.386 sq mi or 247 acres) and river estuaries.

Pennesières is a commune in the Haute-Saône department in the region of Bourgogne-Franche-Comté in eastern France.

== See also ==
- Communes of the Haute-Saône department
