= Authoison =

- Commune
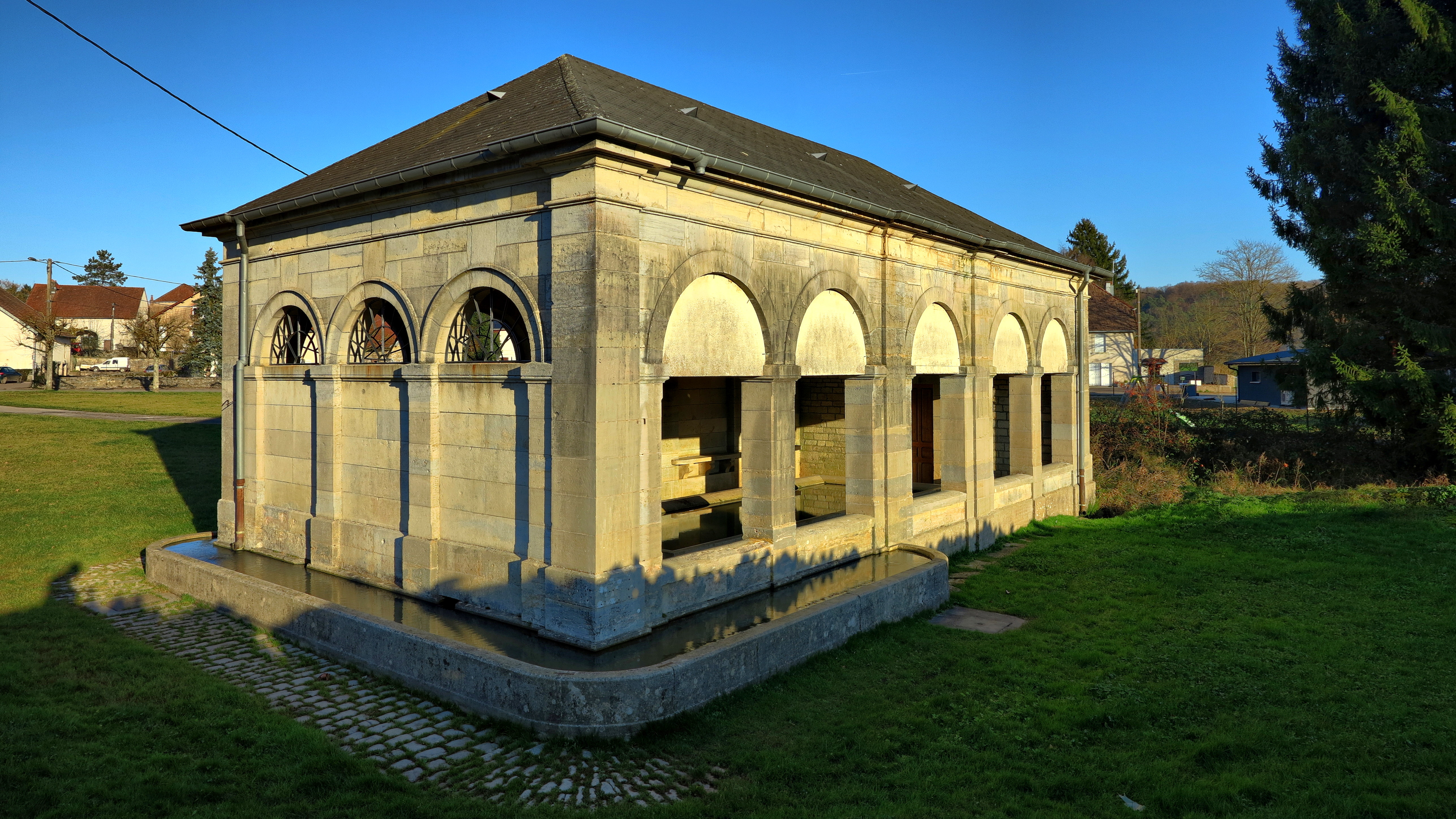
- The wash house in Authoison
- Location of Authoison
- Location within France Location within Bourgogne-Franche-Comté
- Coordinates: 47°29′24″N 6°08′53″E
- Country: France
- Region: Bourgogne-Franche-Comté
- Department: Haute-Saône
- Arrondissement: Vesoul
- Canton: Rioz
- Intercommunality: CC Pays Montbozon Chanois

Government
  - Mayor (2020–2026): Jérémie Denoix
- Area^{1}: 16.02 km^{2} (6.19 sq mi)
- Highest elevation: 387 m (1,270 ft)
- Lowest elevation: 252 m (827 ft)
- Population (2023): 314
  - Density: 19.6/km^{2} (50.8/sq mi)
- Time zone: UTC+01:00 (CET)
  - Summer (DST): UTC+02:00 (CEST)
- INSEE/Postal code: 70038 /70190
- ^{1} French Land Register data, which excludes lakes, ponds, glaciers > 1 km^{2} (0.386 sq mi or 247 acres) and river estuaries.

Authoison (French pronunciation: [otwazɔ̃]) is a commune in the Haute-Saône department in the region of Bourgogne-Franche-Comté in eastern France.

== See also ==
- Communes of the Haute-Saône department
