= Fontenois-lès-Montbozon =

- Commune
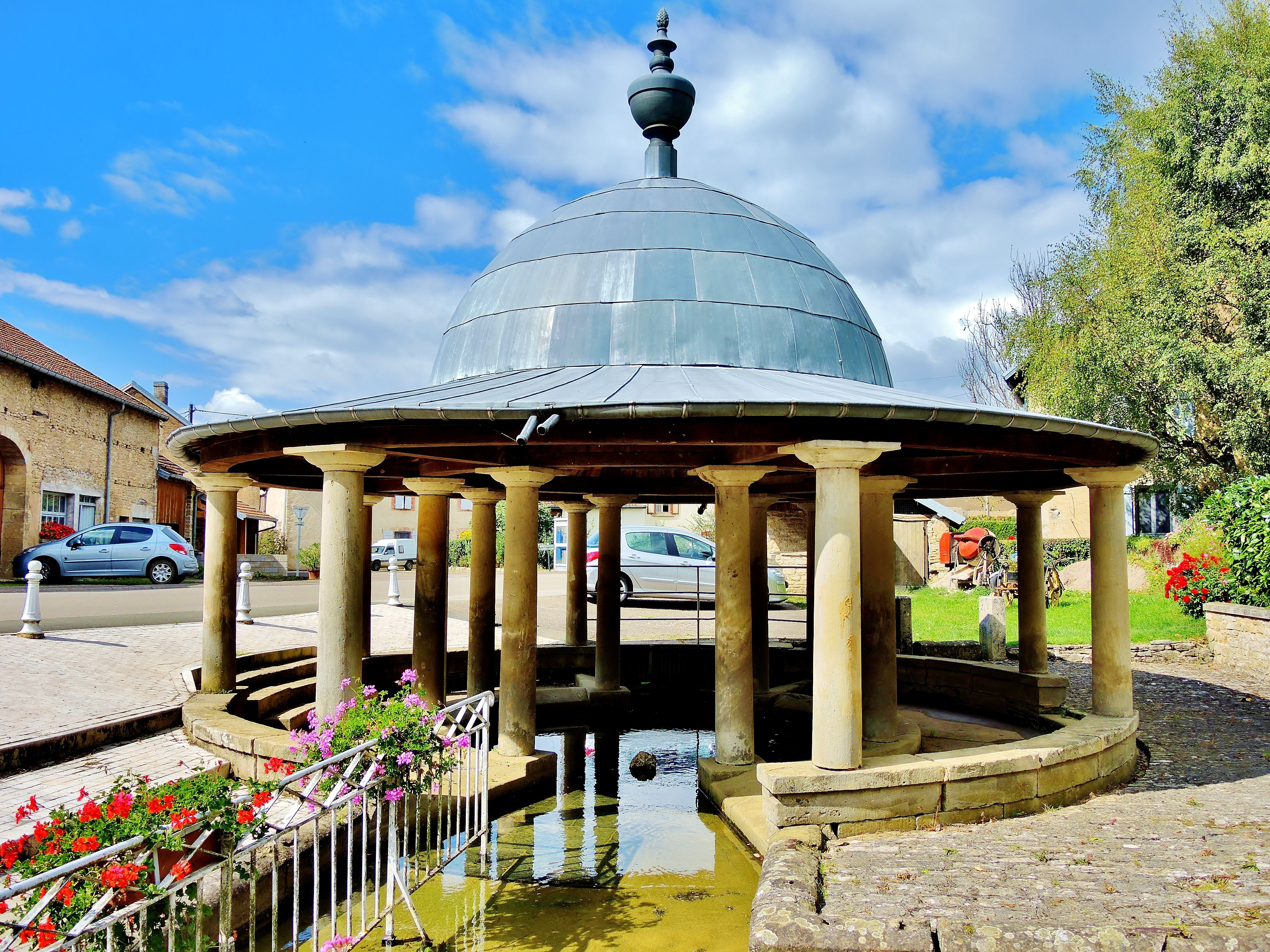
- The wash house in Fontenois-lès-Montbozon
- Location of Fontenois-lès-Montbozon
- Location within France Location within Bourgogne-Franche-Comté
- Coordinates: 47°29′12″N 6°14′07″E
- Country: France
- Region: Bourgogne-Franche-Comté
- Department: Haute-Saône
- Arrondissement: Vesoul
- Canton: Rioz

Government
  - Mayor (2020–2026): Edwige Eme
- Area^{1}: 14.27 km^{2} (5.51 sq mi)
- Highest elevation: 348 m (1,142 ft)
- Lowest elevation: 249 m (817 ft)
- Population (2023): 305
  - Density: 21.4/km^{2} (55.4/sq mi)
- Time zone: UTC+01:00 (CET)
  - Summer (DST): UTC+02:00 (CEST)
- INSEE/Postal code: 70243 /70230
- ^{1} French Land Register data, which excludes lakes, ponds, glaciers > 1 km^{2} (0.386 sq mi or 247 acres) and river estuaries.

Fontenois-lès-Montbozon (French pronunciation: [fɔ̃tnwa lɛ mɔ̃bozɔ̃], literally Fontenois near Montbozon) is a commune in the Haute-Saône department in the region of Bourgogne-Franche-Comté in eastern France.

== See also ==
- Communes of the Haute-Saône department
