= Le Magnoray =

- Commune
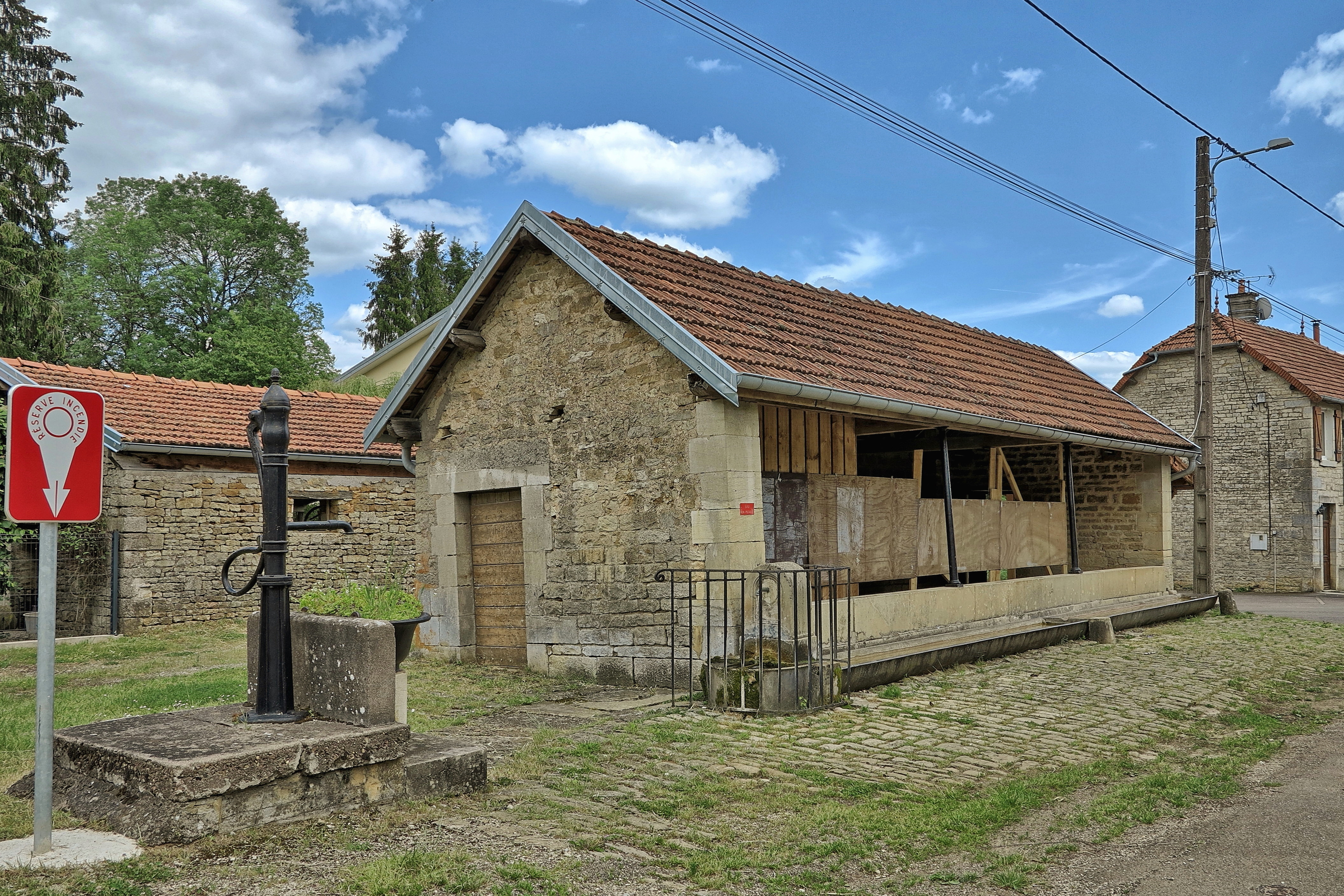
- The wash house in Le Magnoray

- Coat of arms
- Location of Le Magnoray
- Location within France Location within Bourgogne-Franche-Comté
- Coordinates: 47°31′43″N 6°06′16″E
- Country: France
- Region: Bourgogne-Franche-Comté
- Department: Haute-Saône
- Arrondissement: Vesoul
- Canton: Rioz

Government
  - Mayor (2020–2026): Denise Petiet
- Area^{1}: 3.55 km^{2} (1.37 sq mi)
- Highest elevation: 440 m (1,440 ft)
- Lowest elevation: 324 m (1,063 ft)
- Population (2023): 88
  - Density: 25/km^{2} (64/sq mi)
- Time zone: UTC+01:00 (CET)
  - Summer (DST): UTC+02:00 (CEST)
- INSEE/Postal code: 70316 /70000
- ^{1} French Land Register data, which excludes lakes, ponds, glaciers > 1 km^{2} (0.386 sq mi or 247 acres) and river estuaries.

Le Magnoray (French pronunciation: [lə maɲɔʁɛ]) is a commune in the Haute-Saône department in the region of Bourgogne-Franche-Comté in eastern France.

== See also ==
- Communes of the Haute-Saône department
