= Cordonnet =

- Commune
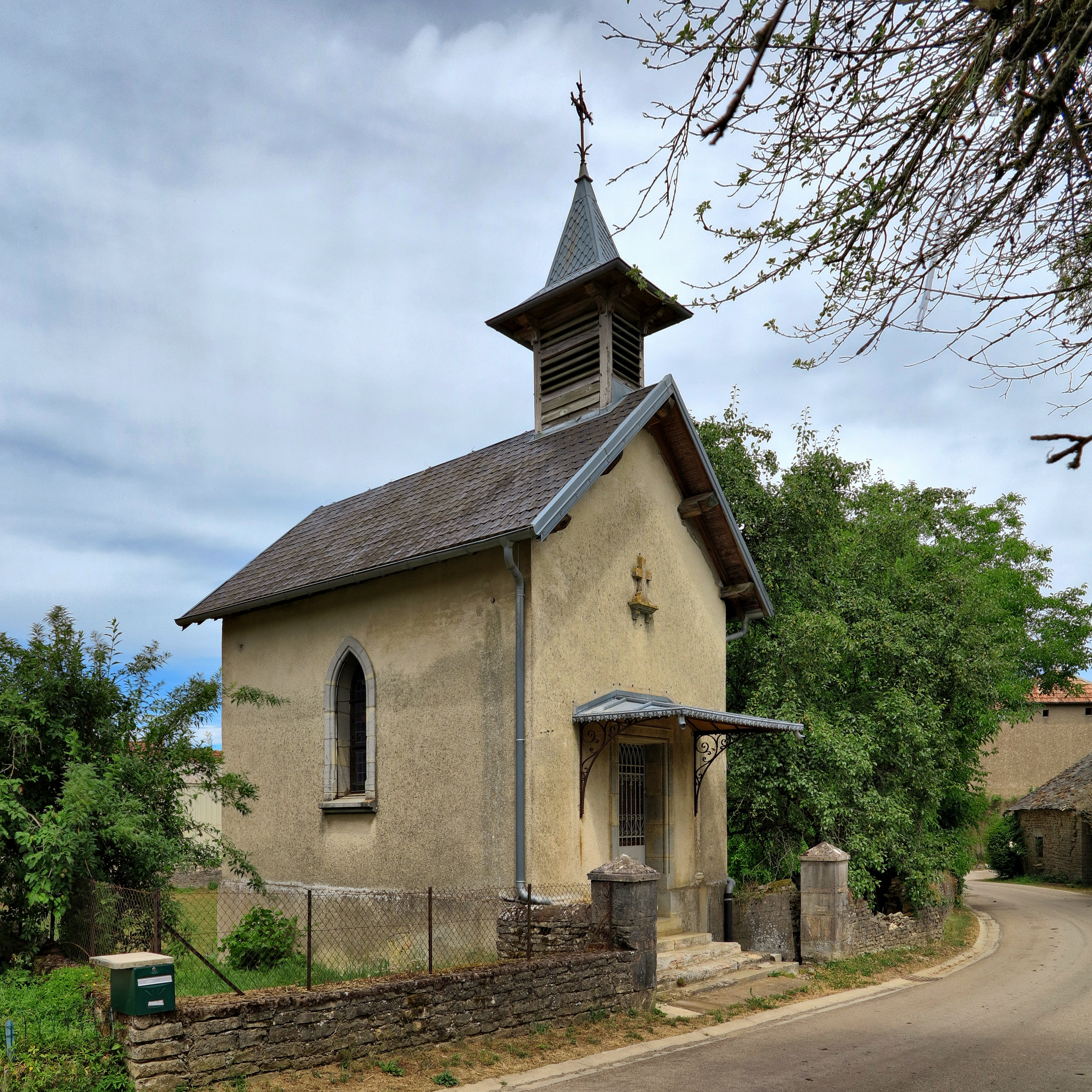
- The chapel in Cordonnet

- Coat of arms
- Location of Cordonnet
- Location within France Location within Bourgogne-Franche-Comté
- Coordinates: 47°25′02″N 5°58′19″E
- Country: France
- Region: Bourgogne-Franche-Comté
- Department: Haute-Saône
- Arrondissement: Vesoul
- Canton: Rioz

Government
  - Mayor (2020–2026): Pierre Migard
- Area^{1}: 10.45 km^{2} (4.03 sq mi)
- Highest elevation: 422 m (1,385 ft)
- Lowest elevation: 230 m (750 ft)
- Population (2023): 150
  - Density: 14/km^{2} (37/sq mi)
- Time zone: UTC+01:00 (CET)
  - Summer (DST): UTC+02:00 (CEST)
- INSEE/Postal code: 70174 /70190
- ^{1} French Land Register data, which excludes lakes, ponds, glaciers > 1 km^{2} (0.386 sq mi or 247 acres) and river estuaries.

Cordonnet (French pronunciation: [kɔʁdɔnɛ]) is a commune in the Haute-Saône department in the region of Bourgogne-Franche-Comté in eastern France.

== See also ==
- Communes of the Haute-Saône department
