= Échenoz-le-Sec =

- Commune
- Location of Échenoz-le-Sec
- Location within France Location within Bourgogne-Franche-Comté
- Coordinates: 47°32′28″N 6°07′21″E
- Country: France
- Region: Bourgogne-Franche-Comté
- Department: Haute-Saône
- Arrondissement: Vesoul
- Canton: Rioz
- Area^{1}: 15.47 km^{2} (5.97 sq mi)
- Highest elevation: 469 m (1,539 ft)
- Lowest elevation: 305 m (1,001 ft)
- Population (2023): 277
  - Density: 17.9/km^{2} (46.4/sq mi)
- Time zone: UTC+01:00 (CET)
  - Summer (DST): UTC+02:00 (CEST)
- INSEE/Postal code: 70208 /70000
- ^{1} French Land Register data, which excludes lakes, ponds, glaciers > 1 km^{2} (0.386 sq mi or 247 acres) and river estuaries.

Échenoz-le-Sec is a commune in the Haute-Saône department in the region of Bourgogne-Franche-Comté in eastern France.The village of Échenoz-le-Sec belongs to the district of Vesoul and to the canton of Montbozon. The zip code of the village of Échenoz-le-Sec is 70000 and its code Insee(National Institute for Statistics and Economic Studies) is 70208.

== See also ==
- Communes of the Haute-Saône department
