= Villers-Bouton =

- Commune
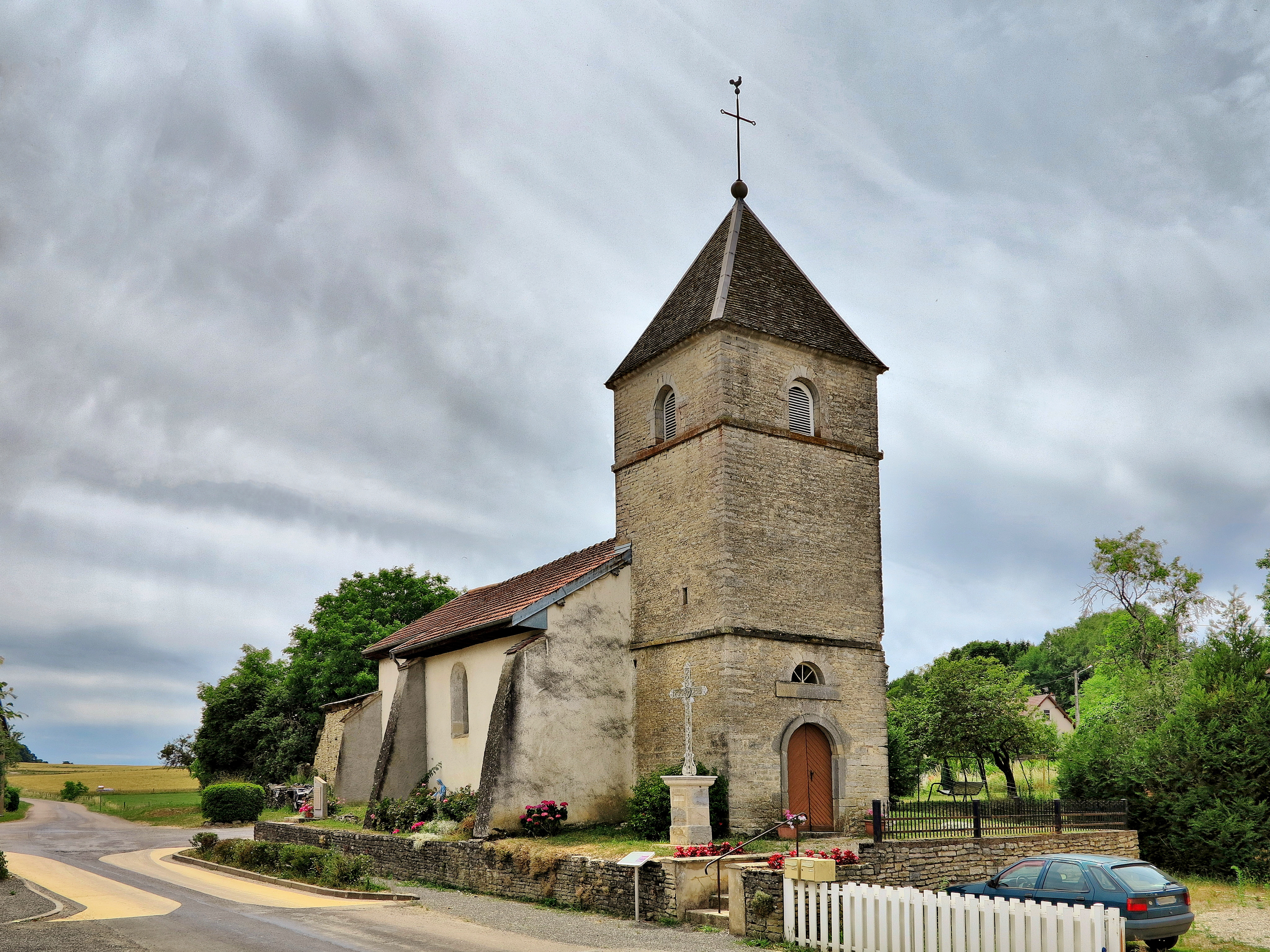
- The church in Villers-Bouton
- Location of Villers-Bouton
- Location within France Location within Bourgogne-Franche-Comté
- Coordinates: 47°27′08″N 5°58′47″E
- Country: France
- Region: Bourgogne-Franche-Comté
- Department: Haute-Saône
- Arrondissement: Vesoul
- Canton: Rioz
- Area^{1}: 5.26 km^{2} (2.03 sq mi)
- Highest elevation: 421 m (1,381 ft)
- Lowest elevation: 307 m (1,007 ft)
- Population (2023): 178
  - Density: 33.8/km^{2} (87.6/sq mi)
- Time zone: UTC+01:00 (CET)
  - Summer (DST): UTC+02:00 (CEST)
- INSEE/Postal code: 70560 /70190
- ^{1} French Land Register data, which excludes lakes, ponds, glaciers > 1 km^{2} (0.386 sq mi or 247 acres) and river estuaries.

Villers-Bouton is a commune in the Haute-Saône department in the region of Bourgogne-Franche-Comté in eastern France.

== See also ==
- Communes of the Haute-Saône department
