= Chambornay-lès-Bellevaux =

- Commune
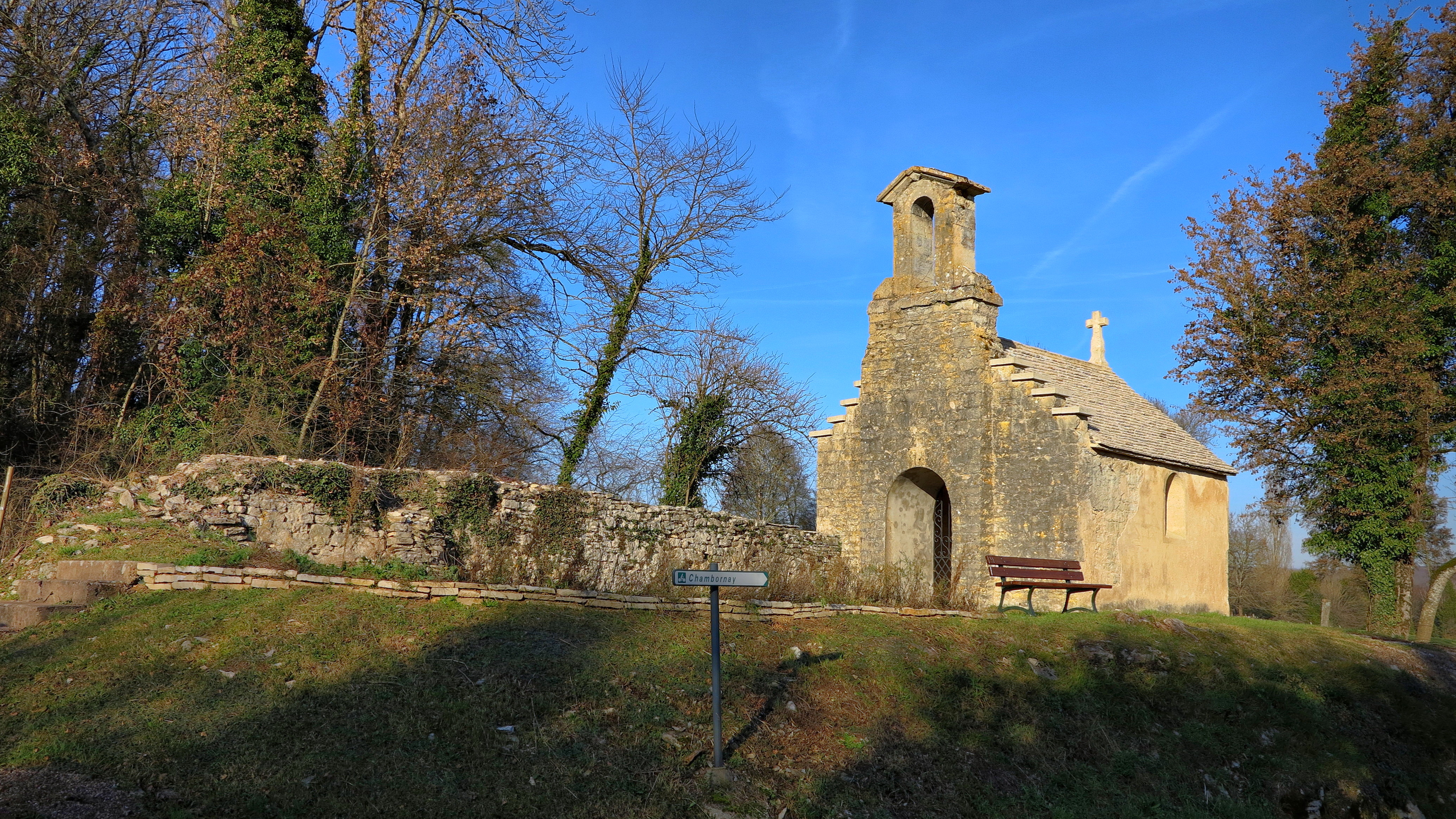
- The chapel in Chambornay-lès-Bellevaux
- Location of Chambornay-lès-Bellevaux
- Location within France Location within Bourgogne-Franche-Comté
- Coordinates: 47°23′29″N 6°06′26″E
- Country: France
- Region: Bourgogne-Franche-Comté
- Department: Haute-Saône
- Arrondissement: Vesoul
- Canton: Rioz

Government
  - Mayor (2020–2026): Dominique Peyreton
- Area^{1}: 5.89 km^{2} (2.27 sq mi)
- Highest elevation: 332 m (1,089 ft)
- Lowest elevation: 219 m (719 ft)
- Population (2023): 180
  - Density: 31/km^{2} (79/sq mi)
- Time zone: UTC+01:00 (CET)
  - Summer (DST): UTC+02:00 (CEST)
- INSEE/Postal code: 70118 /70190
- ^{1} French Land Register data, which excludes lakes, ponds, glaciers > 1 km^{2} (0.386 sq mi or 247 acres) and river estuaries.

Chambornay-lès-Bellevaux (French pronunciation: [ʃɑ̃bɔʁnɛ lɛ bɛlvo]) is a commune in the Haute-Saône department in the region of Bourgogne-Franche-Comté in eastern France.

== See also ==
- Communes of the Haute-Saône department
