= Trésilley =

- Commune
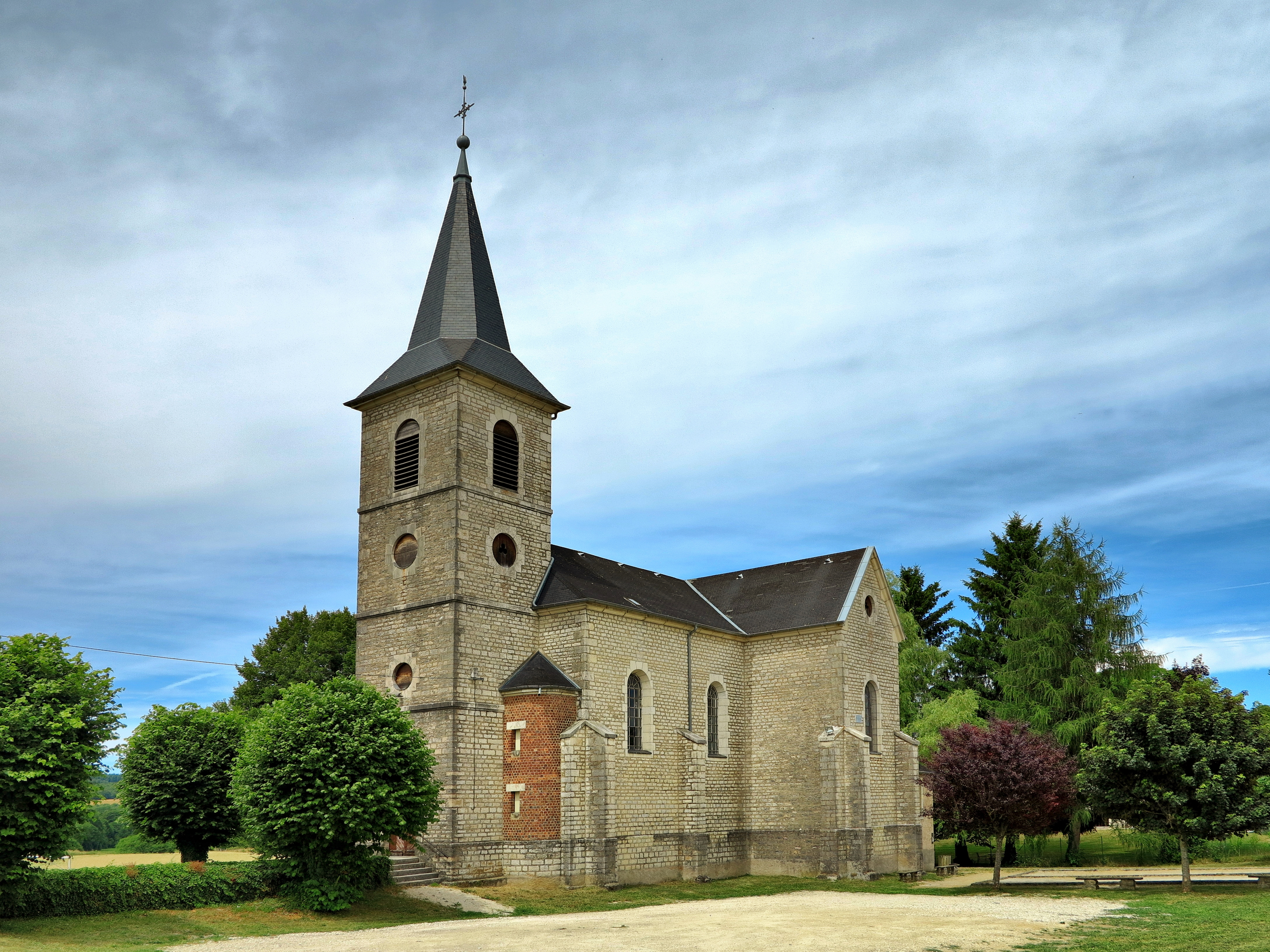
- The church in Trésilley
- Location of Trésilley
- Location within France Location within Bourgogne-Franche-Comté
- Coordinates: 47°27′06″N 6°01′54″E
- Country: France
- Region: Bourgogne-Franche-Comté
- Department: Haute-Saône
- Arrondissement: Vesoul
- Canton: Rioz

Government
  - Mayor (2020–2026): Emmanuel Fleurot
- Area^{1}: 11.08 km^{2} (4.28 sq mi)
- Highest elevation: 399 m (1,309 ft)
- Lowest elevation: 267 m (876 ft)
- Population (2023): 287
  - Density: 25.9/km^{2} (67.1/sq mi)
- Time zone: UTC+01:00 (CET)
  - Summer (DST): UTC+02:00 (CEST)
- INSEE/Postal code: 70507 /70190
- ^{1} French Land Register data, which excludes lakes, ponds, glaciers > 1 km^{2} (0.386 sq mi or 247 acres) and river estuaries.

Trésilley (French pronunciation: [tʁezijɛ]) is a commune in the Haute-Saône department in the region of Bourgogne-Franche-Comté in eastern France.

== See also ==
- Communes of the Haute-Saône department
