= Maizières, Haute-Saône =

Maizières
- Commune
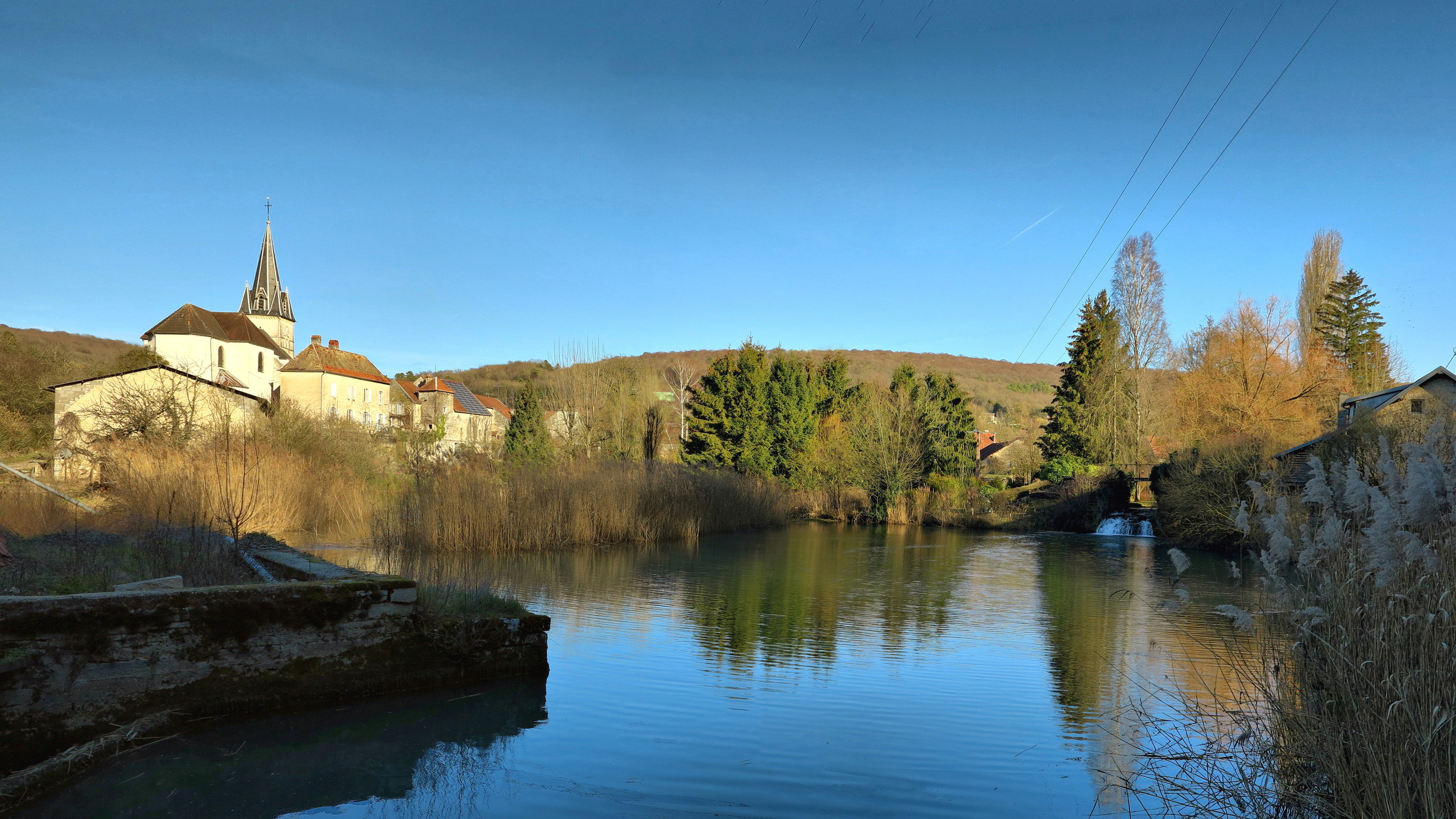
- The Romaine river in Maizières

- Coat of arms
- Location of Maizières
- Location within France Location within Bourgogne-Franche-Comté
- Coordinates: 47°29′38″N 6°00′45″E
- Country: France
- Region: Bourgogne-Franche-Comté
- Department: Haute-Saône
- Arrondissement: Vesoul
- Canton: Rioz

Government
  - Mayor (2020–2026): Noël Costille
- Area^{1}: 11.68 km^{2} (4.51 sq mi)
- Highest elevation: 437 m (1,434 ft)
- Lowest elevation: 227 m (745 ft)
- Population (2023): 317
  - Density: 27.1/km^{2} (70.3/sq mi)
- Time zone: UTC+01:00 (CET)
  - Summer (DST): UTC+02:00 (CEST)
- INSEE/Postal code: 70325 /70190
- ^{1} French Land Register data, which excludes lakes, ponds, glaciers > 1 km^{2} (0.386 sq mi or 247 acres) and river estuaries.

Maizières (French pronunciation: [mɛzjɛʁ]) is a commune in the Haute-Saône department in the region of Bourgogne-Franche-Comté in eastern France.

== See also ==
- Communes of the Haute-Saône department
