= Auxon =

Auxon can mean:

- A type of large-scale self-replicating machine
- Auxon, Aube, a commune in France
- Auxon, Haute-Saône, a commune in France
