= Montureux-lès-Baulay =

- Commune
- Location of Montureux-lès-Baulay
- Location within France Location within Bourgogne-Franche-Comté
- Coordinates: 47°49′06″N 5°58′54″E
- Country: France
- Region: Bourgogne-Franche-Comté
- Department: Haute-Saône
- Arrondissement: Vesoul
- Canton: Port-sur-Saône

Government
  - Mayor (2023–2026): Jean-Pierre Chalmey
- Area^{1}: 6.34 km^{2} (2.45 sq mi)
- Highest elevation: 278 m (912 ft)
- Lowest elevation: 212 m (696 ft)
- Population (2023): 164
  - Density: 25.9/km^{2} (67.0/sq mi)
- Time zone: UTC+01:00 (CET)
  - Summer (DST): UTC+02:00 (CEST)
- INSEE/Postal code: 70372 /70500
- ^{1} French Land Register data, which excludes lakes, ponds, glaciers > 1 km^{2} (0.386 sq mi or 247 acres) and river estuaries.

Montureux-lès-Baulay (French pronunciation: [mɔ̃tyʁø lɛ bolɛ], literally Montureux near Baulay) is a commune in the Haute-Saône department in the region of Bourgogne-Franche-Comté in eastern France.

== See also ==
- Communes of the Haute-Saône department
