= Flagy =

Flagy may refer to:

- Flagy, Haute-Saône, France
- Flagy, Saône-et-Loire, France
- Flagy, Seine-et-Marne, France
