= Betoncourt-Saint-Pancras =

- Commune
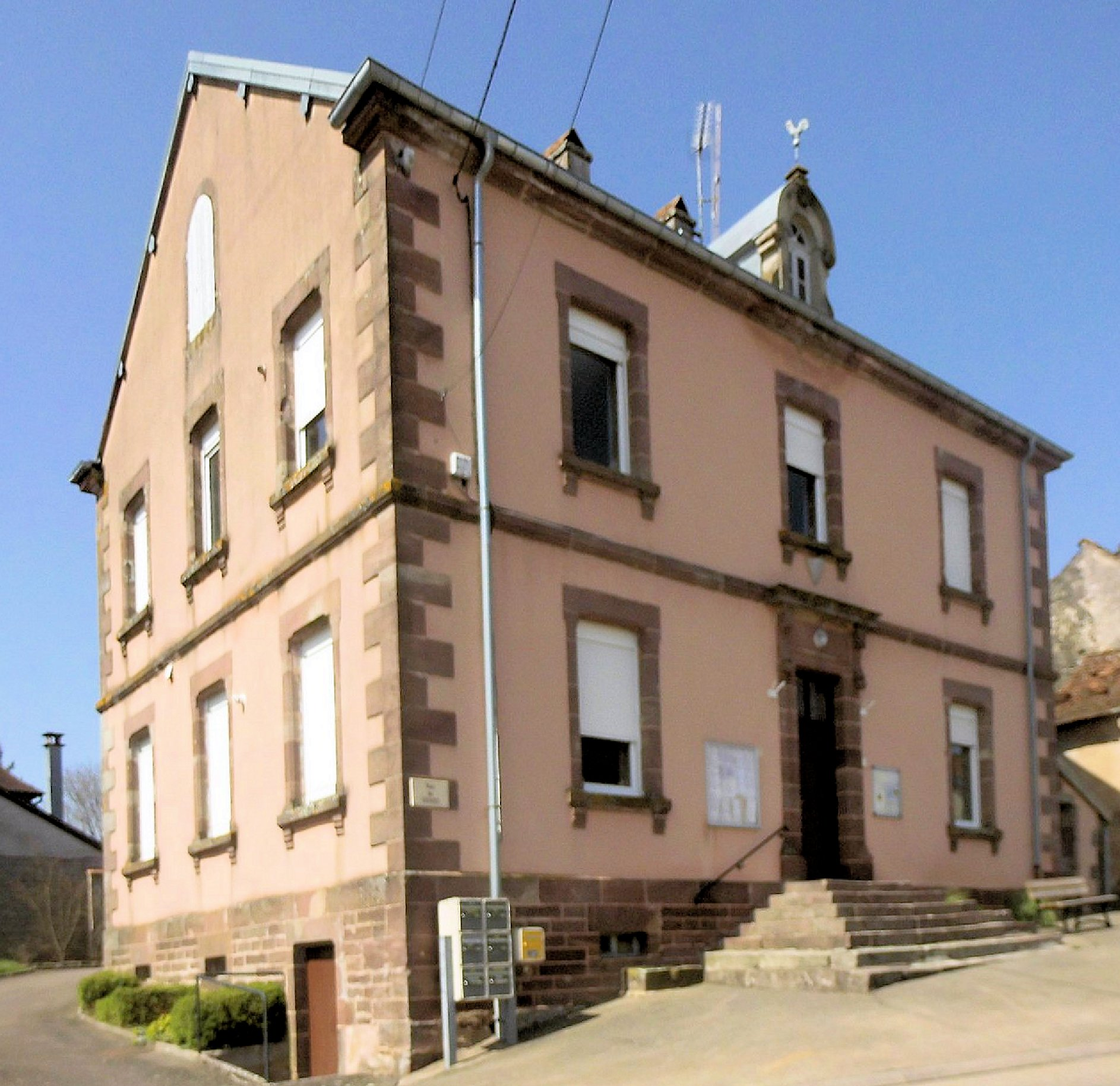
- The town hall in Betoncourt-Saint-Pancras
- Location of Betoncourt-Saint-Pancras
- Location within France Location within Bourgogne-Franche-Comté
- Coordinates: 47°55′09″N 6°10′19″E
- Country: France
- Region: Bourgogne-Franche-Comté
- Department: Haute-Saône
- Arrondissement: Lure
- Canton: Port-sur-Saône
- Area^{1}: 6.35 km^{2} (2.45 sq mi)
- Highest elevation: 337 m (1,106 ft)
- Lowest elevation: 238 m (781 ft)
- Population (2023): 40
  - Density: 6.3/km^{2} (16/sq mi)
- Time zone: UTC+01:00 (CET)
  - Summer (DST): UTC+02:00 (CEST)
- INSEE/Postal code: 70069 /70210
- ^{1} French Land Register data, which excludes lakes, ponds, glaciers > 1 km^{2} (0.386 sq mi or 247 acres) and river estuaries.

Betoncourt-Saint-Pancras is a commune in the Haute-Saône department in the region of Bourgogne-Franche-Comté in eastern France.

From 1801, it was part of the canton of Vauvillers. Following the cantonal redistricting in France in 2014, the canton was abolished as an administrative division and became solely an electoral constituency.

== See also ==
- Communes of the Haute-Saône department
