= Breurey-lès-Faverney =

- Commune
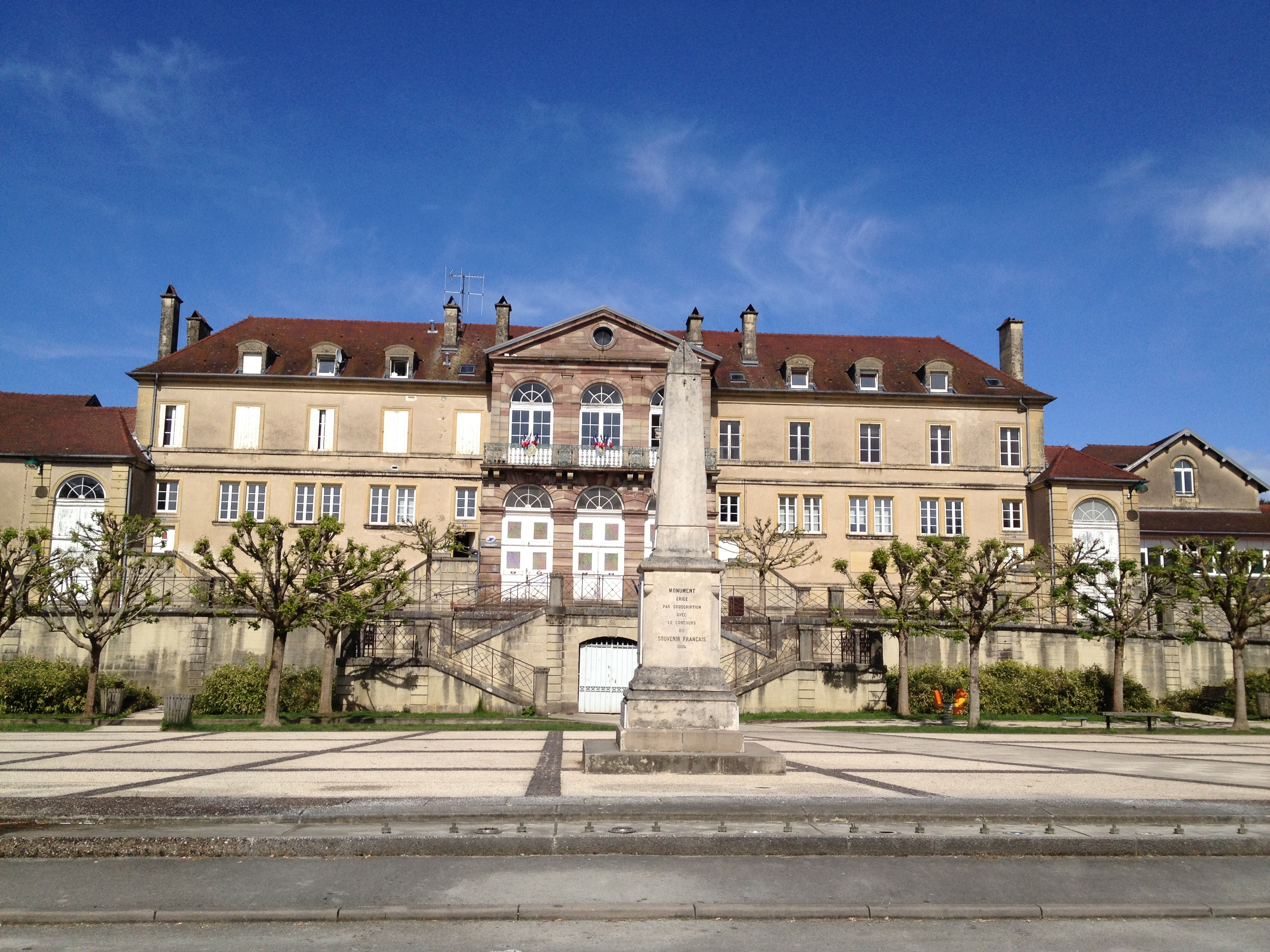
- The town hall in Breurey-lès-Faverney

- Coat of arms
- Location of Breurey-lès-Faverney
- Location within France Location within Bourgogne-Franche-Comté
- Coordinates: 47°45′24″N 6°07′58″E
- Country: France
- Region: Bourgogne-Franche-Comté
- Department: Haute-Saône
- Arrondissement: Vesoul
- Canton: Port-sur-Saône

Government
  - Mayor (2020–2026): Jean Marchal
- Area^{1}: 19.48 km^{2} (7.52 sq mi)
- Highest elevation: 415 m (1,362 ft)
- Lowest elevation: 215 m (705 ft)
- Population (2023): 588
  - Density: 30.2/km^{2} (78.2/sq mi)
- Time zone: UTC+01:00 (CET)
  - Summer (DST): UTC+02:00 (CEST)
- INSEE/Postal code: 70095 /70160
- ^{1} French Land Register data, which excludes lakes, ponds, glaciers > 1 km^{2} (0.386 sq mi or 247 acres) and river estuaries.

Breurey-lès-Faverney (French pronunciation: [bʁœʁɛ lɛ favɛʁnɛ], lit. 'Breurey near Faverney') is a commune in the Haute-Saône department in the region of Bourgogne-Franche-Comté in eastern France.

== See also ==
- Communes of the Haute-Saône department
