= Canton of Port-sur-Saône =

Coordinates: 47.69°N 6.04°E

The canton of Port-sur-Saône is an administrative division of the Haute-Saône department, northeastern France. Its borders were modified at the French canton reorganisation which came into effect in March 2015. Its seat is in Port-sur-Saône.

It consists of the following communes:

1. Amance
2. Amoncourt
3. Anchenoncourt-et-Chazel
4. Anjeux
5. Auxon
6. Bassigney
7. Baulay
8. Betoncourt-Saint-Pancras
9. Bougnon
10. Bouligney
11. Bourguignon-lès-Conflans
12. Breurey-lès-Faverney
13. Buffignécourt
14. Chaux-lès-Port
15. Conflandey
16. Contréglise
17. Cubry-lès-Faverney
18. Cuve
19. Dampierre-lès-Conflans
20. Dampvalley-Saint-Pancras
21. Équevilley
22. Faverney
23. Flagy
24. Fleurey-lès-Faverney
25. Fontenois-la-Ville
26. Girefontaine
27. Grattery
28. Jasney
29. Mailleroncourt-Saint-Pancras
30. Melincourt
31. Menoux
32. Mersuay
33. Montureux-lès-Baulay
34. La Pisseure
35. Plainemont
36. Polaincourt-et-Clairefontaine
37. Port-sur-Saône
38. Provenchère
39. Saint-Rémy-en-Comté
40. Saponcourt
41. Scye
42. Senoncourt
43. Le Val-Saint-Éloi
44. Vauchoux
45. Venisey
46. Villers-sur-Port
