= Jasney =

- Commune
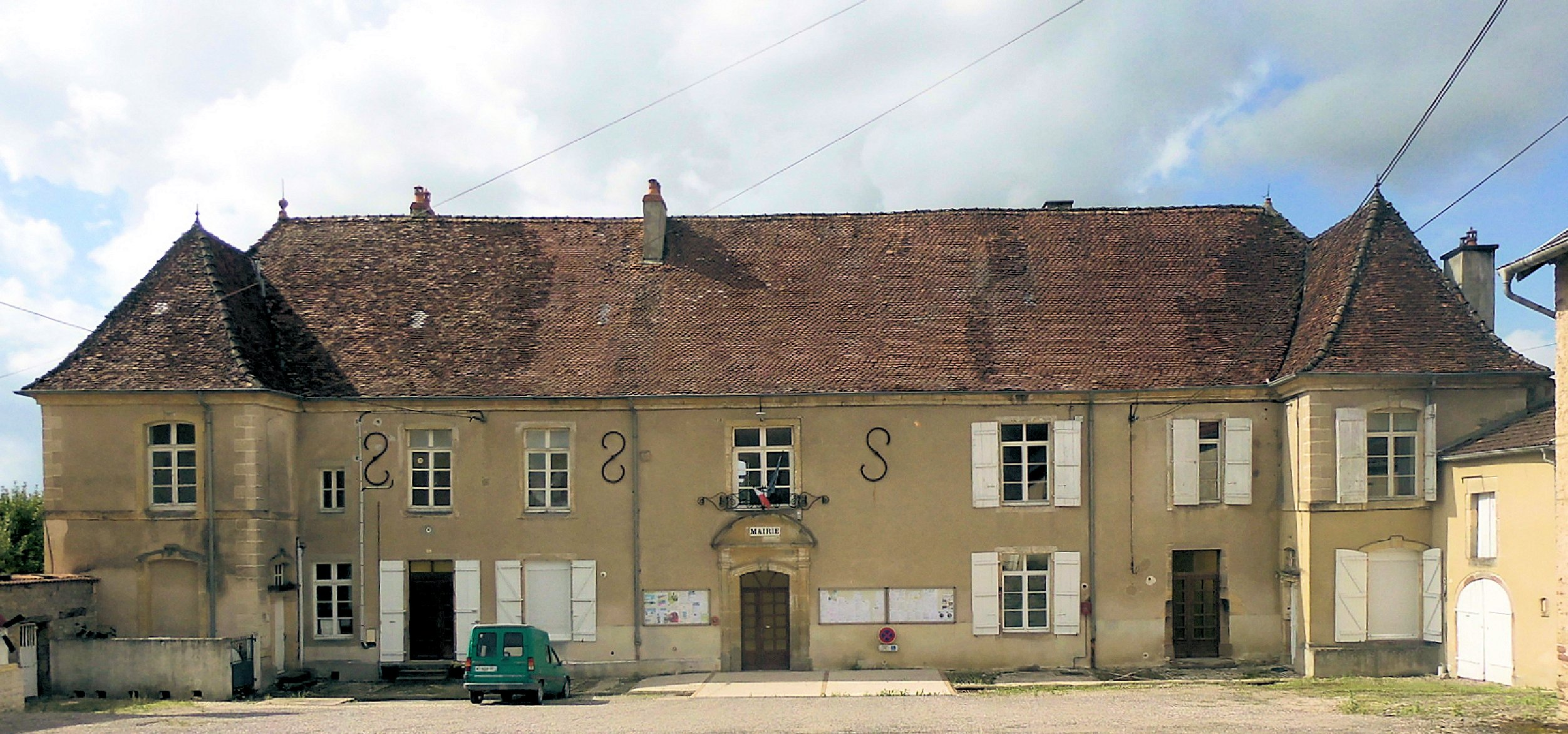
- The chateau and town hall in Jasney

- Coat of arms
- Location of Jasney
- Location within France Location within Bourgogne-Franche-Comté
- Coordinates: 47°52′09″N 6°11′01″E
- Country: France
- Region: Bourgogne-Franche-Comté
- Department: Haute-Saône
- Arrondissement: Lure
- Canton: Port-sur-Saône
- Area^{1}: 13.02 km^{2} (5.03 sq mi)
- Highest elevation: 321 m (1,053 ft)
- Lowest elevation: 227 m (745 ft)
- Population (2023): 190
  - Density: 15/km^{2} (38/sq mi)
- Time zone: UTC+01:00 (CET)
  - Summer (DST): UTC+02:00 (CEST)
- INSEE/Postal code: 70290 /70800
- ^{1} French Land Register data, which excludes lakes, ponds, glaciers > 1 km^{2} (0.386 sq mi or 247 acres) and river estuaries.

Jasney is a commune in the Haute-Saône department in the region of Bourgogne-Franche-Comté in eastern France.

== See also ==
- Communes of the Haute-Saône department
