= Melincourt, Haute-Saône =

Melincourt
- Commune
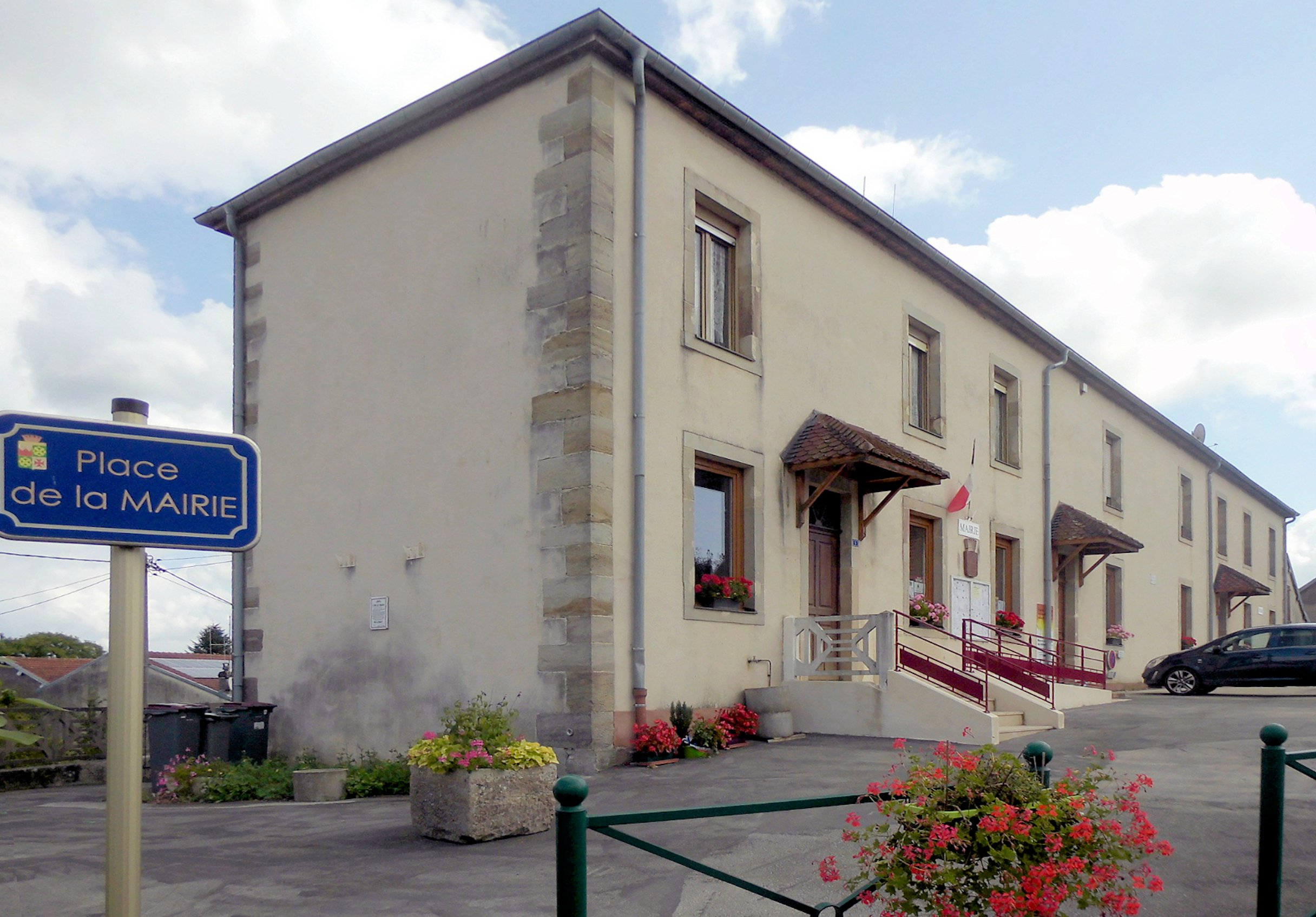
- The town hall in Melincourt

- Coat of arms
- Location of Melincourt
- Location within France Location within Bourgogne-Franche-Comté
- Coordinates: 47°53′11″N 6°07′39″E
- Country: France
- Region: Bourgogne-Franche-Comté
- Department: Haute-Saône
- Arrondissement: Lure
- Canton: Port-sur-Saône
- Area^{1}: 14.98 km^{2} (5.78 sq mi)
- Highest elevation: 328 m (1,076 ft)
- Lowest elevation: 238 m (781 ft)
- Population (2023): 224
  - Density: 15.0/km^{2} (38.7/sq mi)
- Time zone: UTC+01:00 (CET)
  - Summer (DST): UTC+02:00 (CEST)
- INSEE/Postal code: 70338 /70210
- ^{1} French Land Register data, which excludes lakes, ponds, glaciers > 1 km^{2} (0.386 sq mi or 247 acres) and river estuaries.

Melincourt is a commune in the Haute-Saône department in the region of Bourgogne-Franche-Comté in eastern France.

== See also ==
- Communes of the Haute-Saône department
