= Scye =

- Commune
- Coat of arms
- Location of Scye
- Location within France Location within Bourgogne-Franche-Comté
- Coordinates: 47°39′24″N 6°03′32″E
- Country: France
- Region: Bourgogne-Franche-Comté
- Department: Haute-Saône
- Arrondissement: Vesoul
- Canton: Port-sur-Saône

Government
  - Mayor (2020–2026): Roland Jachez
- Area^{1}: 5.84 km^{2} (2.25 sq mi)
- Highest elevation: 298 m (978 ft)
- Lowest elevation: 212 m (696 ft)
- Population (2023): 131
  - Density: 22.4/km^{2} (58.1/sq mi)
- Time zone: UTC+01:00 (CET)
  - Summer (DST): UTC+02:00 (CEST)
- INSEE/Postal code: 70483 /70170
- ^{1} French Land Register data, which excludes lakes, ponds, glaciers > 1 km^{2} (0.386 sq mi or 247 acres) and river estuaries.

Scye (French pronunciation: [si]) is a commune in the Haute-Saône department. It is situated in the region of Bourgogne-Franche-Comté, in eastern France.

== See also ==
- Communes of the Haute-Saône department
