= Menoux =

- Commune
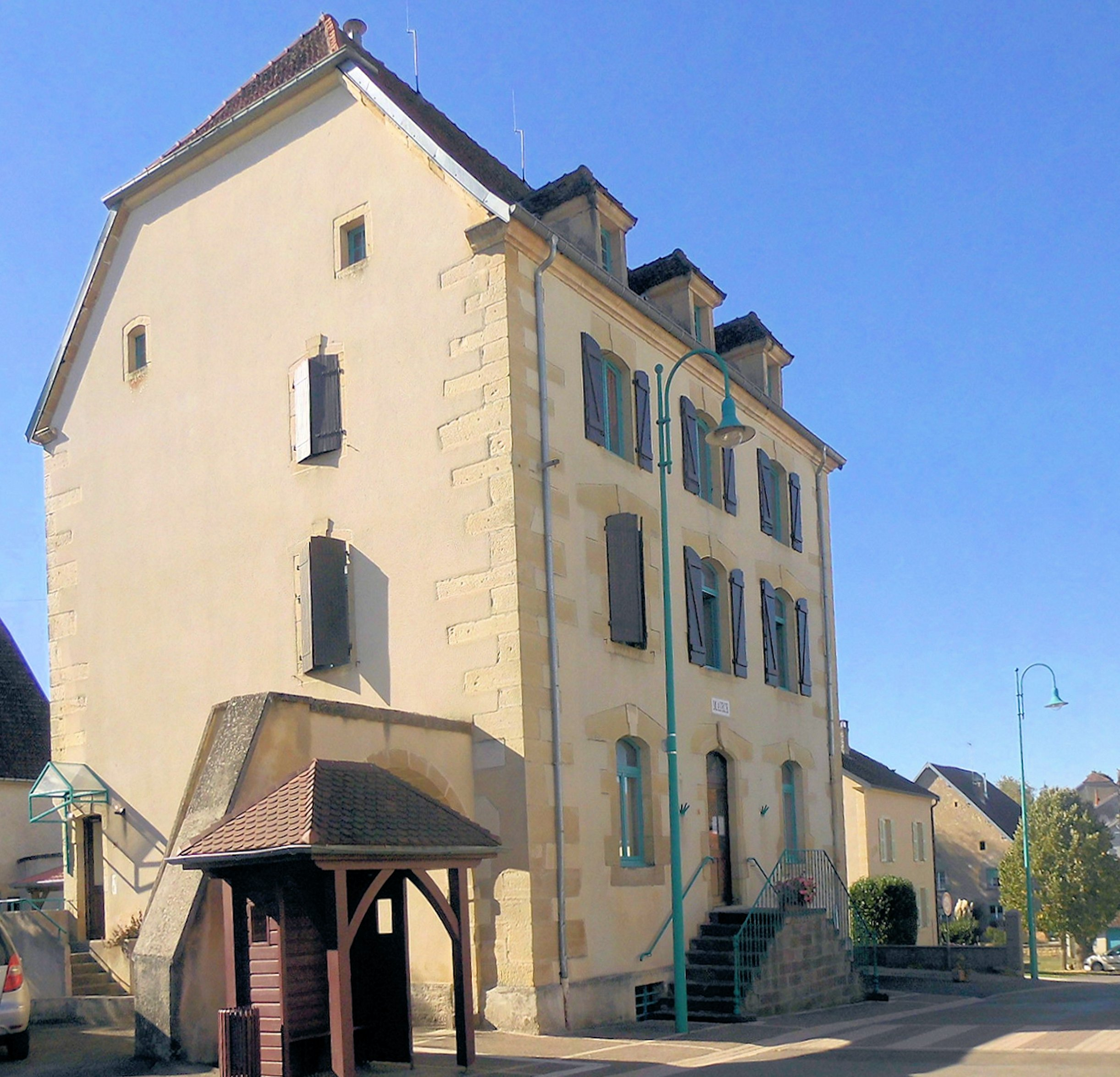
- The town hall in Menoux

- Coat of arms
- Location of Menoux
- Location within France Location within Bourgogne-Franche-Comté
- Coordinates: 47°48′35″N 6°06′14″E
- Country: France
- Region: Bourgogne-Franche-Comté
- Department: Haute-Saône
- Arrondissement: Vesoul
- Canton: Port-sur-Saône
- Area^{1}: 14.70 km^{2} (5.68 sq mi)
- Highest elevation: 335 m (1,099 ft)
- Lowest elevation: 217 m (712 ft)
- Population (2023): 293
  - Density: 19.9/km^{2} (51.6/sq mi)
- Time zone: UTC+01:00 (CET)
  - Summer (DST): UTC+02:00 (CEST)
- INSEE/Postal code: 70341 /70160
- ^{1} French Land Register data, which excludes lakes, ponds, glaciers > 1 km^{2} (0.386 sq mi or 247 acres) and river estuaries.

Menoux is a commune in the Haute-Saône department in the region of Bourgogne-Franche-Comté in eastern France.

== See also ==
- Communes of the Haute-Saône department
