= Dampvalley-Saint-Pancras =

- Commune
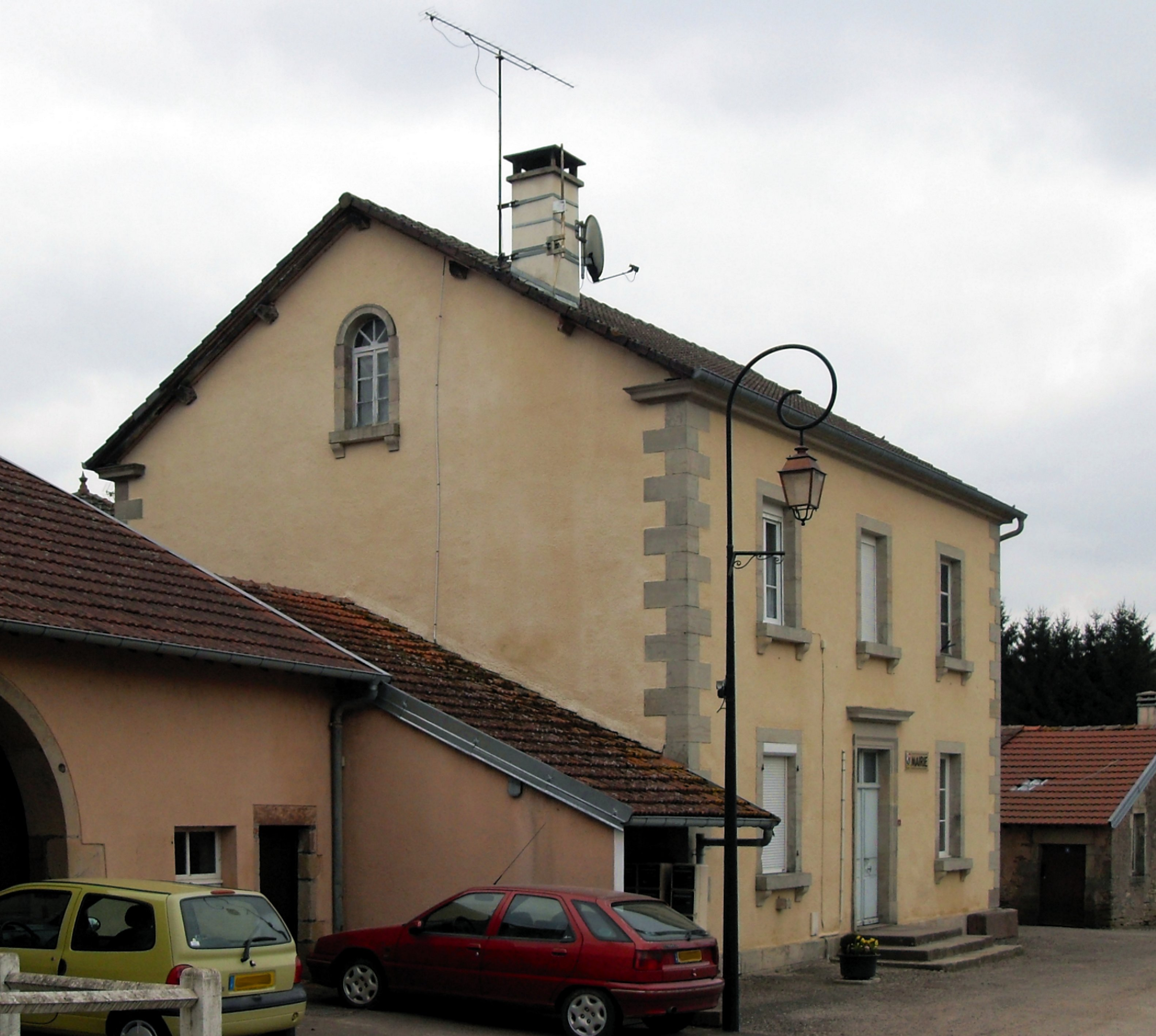
- The town hall in Dampvalley-Saint-Pancras

- Coat of arms
- Location of Dampvalley-Saint-Pancras
- Location within France Location within Bourgogne-Franche-Comté
- Coordinates: 47°54′35″N 6°11′48″E
- Country: France
- Region: Bourgogne-Franche-Comté
- Department: Haute-Saône
- Arrondissement: Lure
- Canton: Port-sur-Saône
- Area^{1}: 4.65 km^{2} (1.80 sq mi)
- Highest elevation: 325 m (1,066 ft)
- Lowest elevation: 237 m (778 ft)
- Population (2023): 44
  - Density: 9.5/km^{2} (25/sq mi)
- Time zone: UTC+01:00 (CET)
  - Summer (DST): UTC+02:00 (CEST)
- INSEE/Postal code: 70200 /70210
- ^{1} French Land Register data, which excludes lakes, ponds, glaciers > 1 km^{2} (0.386 sq mi or 247 acres) and river estuaries.

Dampvalley-Saint-Pancras is a commune in the Haute-Saône department in the region of Bourgogne-Franche-Comté in eastern France.

== See also ==
- Communes of the Haute-Saône department
