= Amoncourt =

- Commune
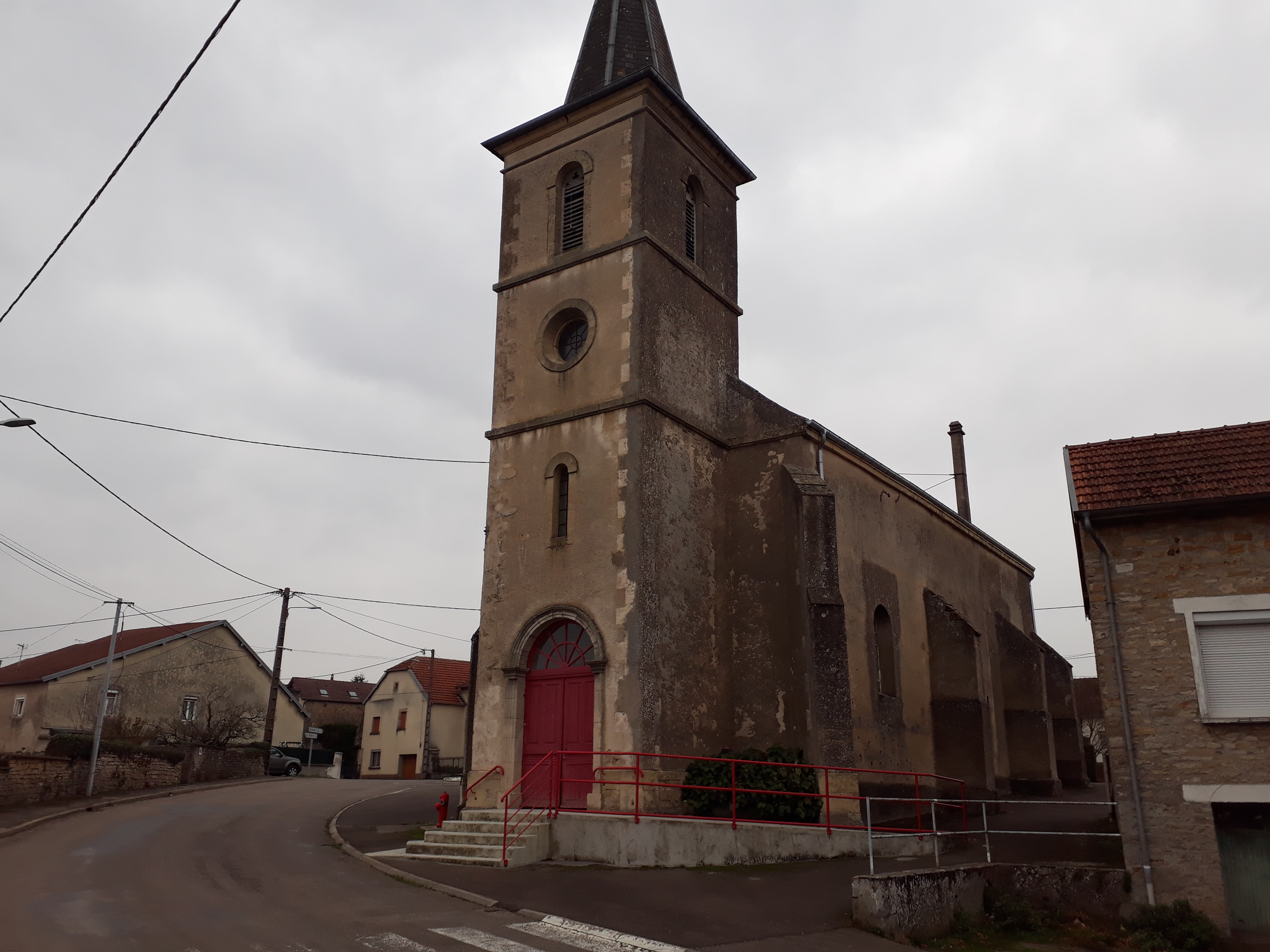
- The church in Amoncourt

- Coat of arms
- Location of Amoncourt
- Location within France Location within Bourgogne-Franche-Comté
- Coordinates: 47°44′13″N 6°03′50″E
- Country: France
- Region: Bourgogne-Franche-Comté
- Department: Haute-Saône
- Arrondissement: Vesoul
- Canton: Port-sur-Saône
- Intercommunality: Terres de Saône

Government
  - Mayor (2020–2026): Marianne Parfait
- Area^{1}: 4.04 km^{2} (1.56 sq mi)
- Highest elevation: 272 m (892 ft)
- Lowest elevation: 209 m (686 ft)
- Population (2023): 270
  - Density: 67/km^{2} (170/sq mi)
- Time zone: UTC+01:00 (CET)
  - Summer (DST): UTC+02:00 (CEST)
- INSEE/Postal code: 70015 /70170
- ^{1} French Land Register data, which excludes lakes, ponds, glaciers > 1 km^{2} (0.386 sq mi or 247 acres) and river estuaries.

Amoncourt (French pronunciation: [amɔ̃kuʁ]) is a commune in the Haute-Saône department in the region of Bourgogne-Franche-Comté in eastern France.

== See also ==
- Communes of the Haute-Saône department
