= Venisey =

- Commune
- Location of Venisey
- Location within France Location within Bourgogne-Franche-Comté
- Coordinates: 47°49′57″N 5°59′42″E
- Country: France
- Region: Bourgogne-Franche-Comté
- Department: Haute-Saône
- Arrondissement: Vesoul
- Canton: Port-sur-Saône
- Area^{1}: 6.80 km^{2} (2.63 sq mi)
- Highest elevation: 312 m (1,024 ft)
- Lowest elevation: 215 m (705 ft)
- Population (2023): 135
  - Density: 19.9/km^{2} (51.4/sq mi)
- Time zone: UTC+01:00 (CET)
  - Summer (DST): UTC+02:00 (CEST)
- INSEE/Postal code: 70545 /70500
- ^{1} French Land Register data, which excludes lakes, ponds, glaciers > 1 km^{2} (0.386 sq mi or 247 acres) and river estuaries.

Venisey is a commune in the Haute-Saône department in the region of Bourgogne-Franche-Comté in eastern France.

== See also ==
- Communes of the Haute-Saône department

== Geography ==
The commune is located about 300 km south-east of Paris, 70 km north of Besançon, 27 km north-west of Vesoul.

== Population ==
The population of the commune is 136 people (2017).
