= Mersuay =

- Commune
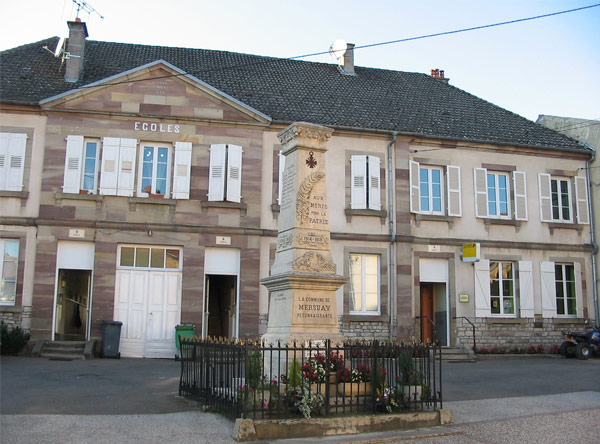
- The town hall, school and war memorial in Mersuay

- Coat of arms
- Location of Mersuay
- Location within France Location within Bourgogne-Franche-Comté
- Coordinates: 47°47′00″N 6°08′22″E
- Country: France
- Region: Bourgogne-Franche-Comté
- Department: Haute-Saône
- Arrondissement: Vesoul
- Canton: Port-sur-Saône

Government
  - Mayor (2024–2026): Christian Chervet
- Area^{1}: 11.75 km^{2} (4.54 sq mi)
- Highest elevation: 256 m (840 ft)
- Lowest elevation: 216 m (709 ft)
- Population (2023): 287
  - Density: 24.4/km^{2} (63.3/sq mi)
- Time zone: UTC+01:00 (CET)
  - Summer (DST): UTC+02:00 (CEST)
- INSEE/Postal code: 70343 /70160
- ^{1} French Land Register data, which excludes lakes, ponds, glaciers > 1 km^{2} (0.386 sq mi or 247 acres) and river estuaries.

Mersuay (French pronunciation: [mɛʁsɥɛ]) is a commune in the Haute-Saône department in the region of Bourgogne-Franche-Comté in eastern France.

== See also ==
- Communes of the Haute-Saône department
