= Villers-sur-Port =

- Commune
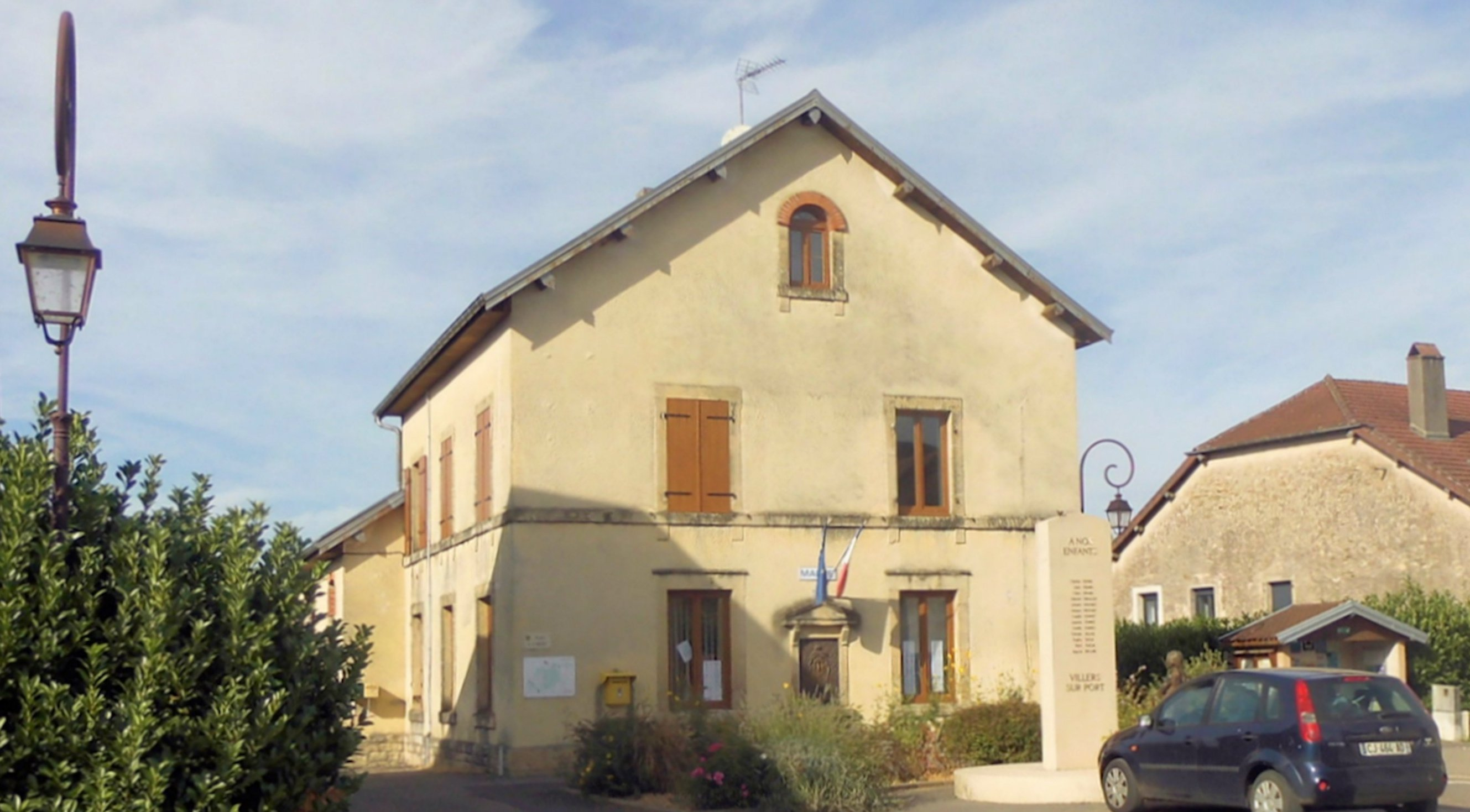
- The town hall in Villers-sur-Port

- Coat of arms
- Location of Villers-sur-Port
- Location within France Location within Bourgogne-Franche-Comté
- Coordinates: 47°42′54″N 6°04′36″E
- Country: France
- Region: Bourgogne-Franche-Comté
- Department: Haute-Saône
- Arrondissement: Vesoul
- Canton: Port-sur-Saône

Government
  - Mayor (2020–2026): Thierry Laurent
- Area^{1}: 10.25 km^{2} (3.96 sq mi)
- Highest elevation: 321 m (1,053 ft)
- Lowest elevation: 239 m (784 ft)
- Population (2023): 203
  - Density: 19.8/km^{2} (51.3/sq mi)
- Time zone: UTC+01:00 (CET)
  - Summer (DST): UTC+02:00 (CEST)
- INSEE/Postal code: 70566 /70170
- ^{1} French Land Register data, which excludes lakes, ponds, glaciers > 1 km^{2} (0.386 sq mi or 247 acres) and river estuaries.

Villers-sur-Port is a commune in the Haute-Saône département in the region of Bourgogne-Franche-Comté in eastern France.

== See also ==
- Communes of the Haute-Saône department
