= Bassigney =

- Commune
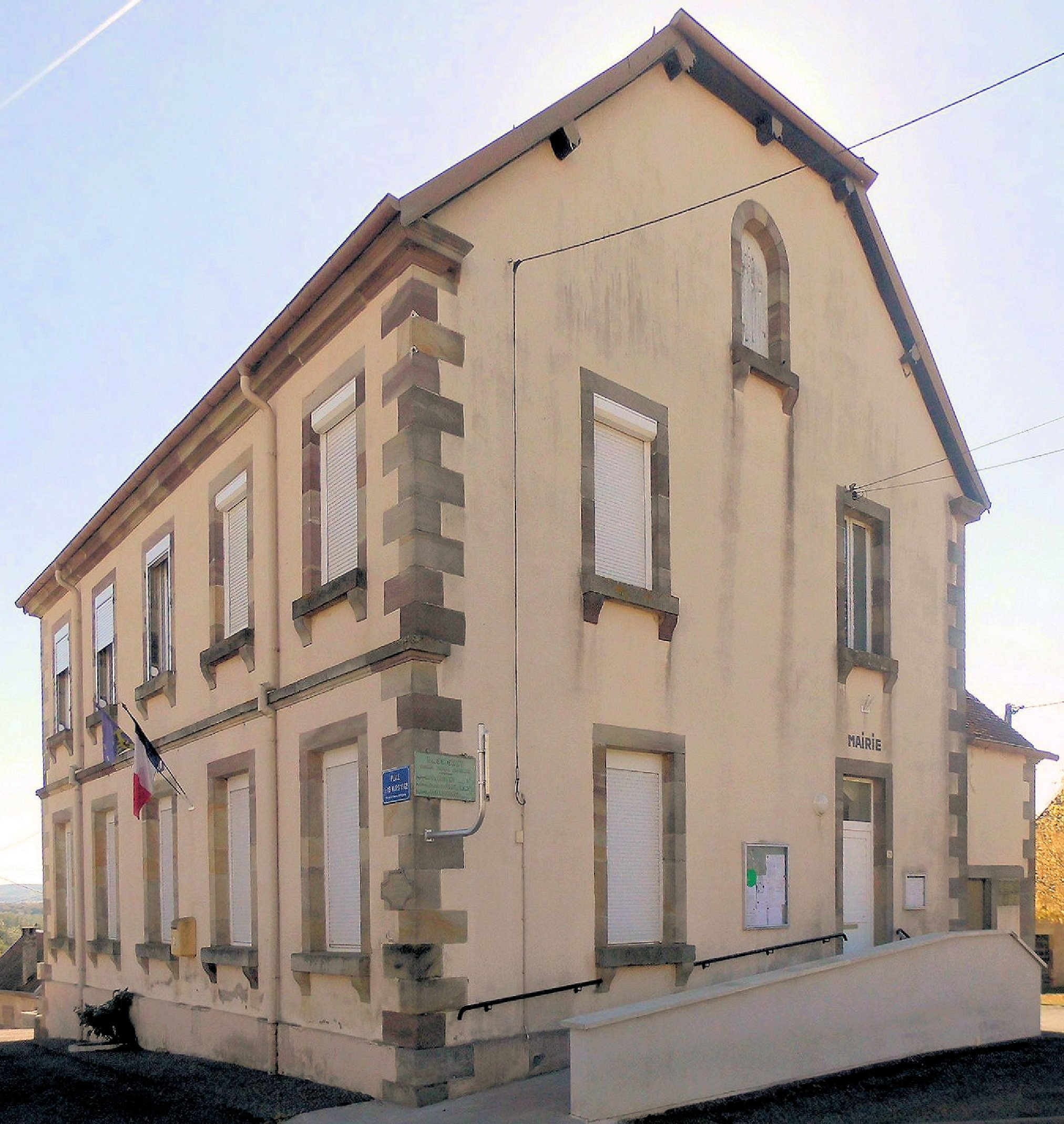
- The town hall and school in Bassigney

- Coat of arms
- Location of Bassigney
- Location within France Location within Bourgogne-Franche-Comté
- Coordinates: 47°49′02″N 6°10′54″E
- Country: France
- Region: Bourgogne-Franche-Comté
- Department: Haute-Saône
- Arrondissement: Lure
- Canton: Port-sur-Saône

Government
  - Mayor (2020–2026): Jean-Luc Brule
- Area^{1}: 6.18 km^{2} (2.39 sq mi)
- Highest elevation: 305 m (1,001 ft)
- Lowest elevation: 220 m (720 ft)
- Population (2023): 123
  - Density: 19.9/km^{2} (51.5/sq mi)
- Time zone: UTC+01:00 (CET)
  - Summer (DST): UTC+02:00 (CEST)
- INSEE/Postal code: 70052 /70800
- ^{1} French Land Register data, which excludes lakes, ponds, glaciers > 1 km^{2} (0.386 sq mi or 247 acres) and river estuaries.

Bassigney (French pronunciation: [basiɲɛ]) is a commune in the Haute-Saône department in the region of Bourgogne-Franche-Comté in eastern France.

== See also ==
- Communes of the Haute-Saône department
