= Senoncourt =

- Commune
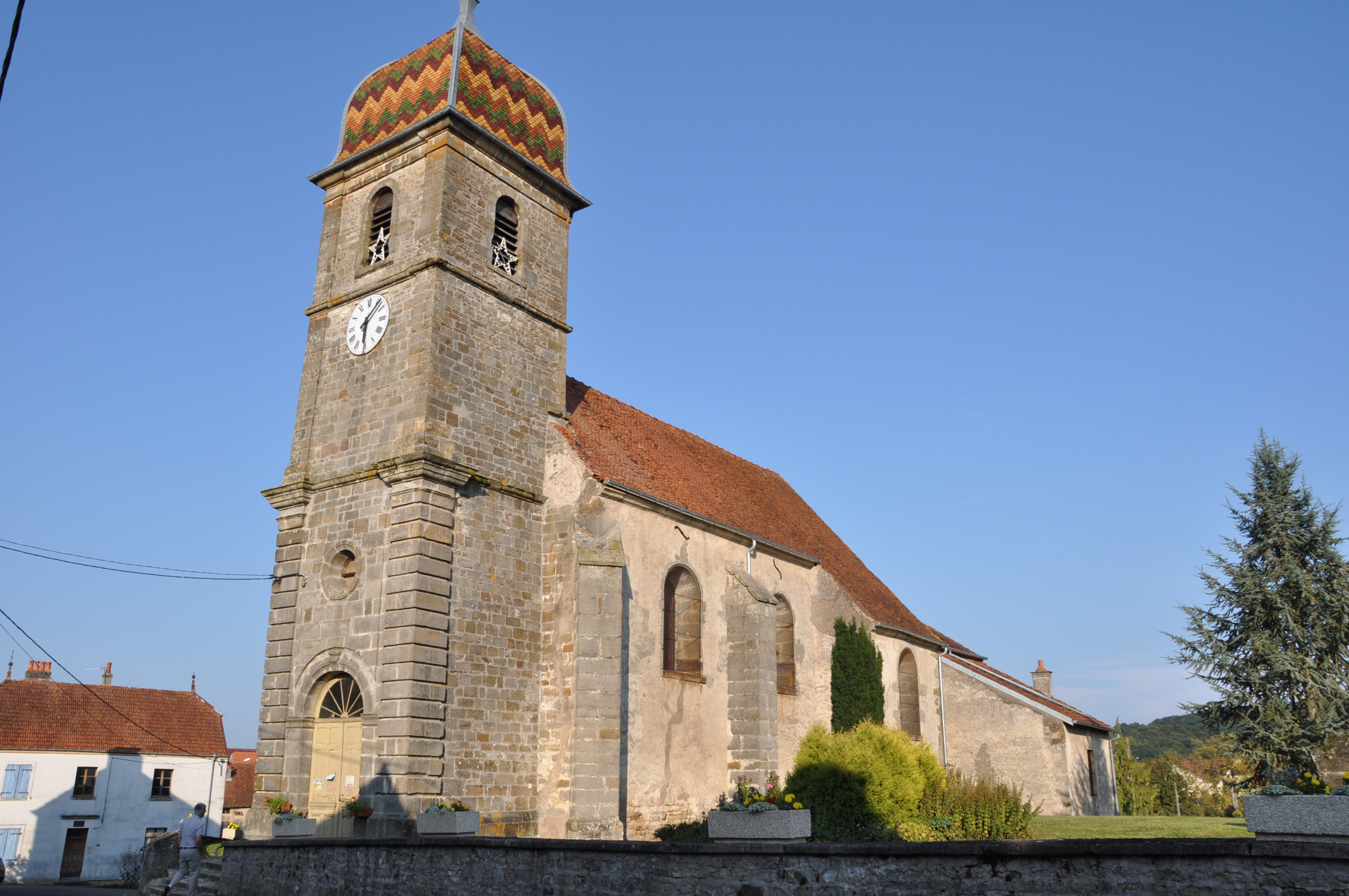
- The church in Senoncourt
- Location of Senoncourt
- Location within France Location within Bourgogne-Franche-Comté
- Coordinates: 47°49′50″N 6°03′47″E
- Country: France
- Region: Bourgogne-Franche-Comté
- Department: Haute-Saône
- Arrondissement: Vesoul
- Canton: Port-sur-Saône

Government
  - Mayor (2023–2026): Christophe Formet
- Area^{1}: 11.26 km^{2} (4.35 sq mi)
- Highest elevation: 335 m (1,099 ft)
- Lowest elevation: 222 m (728 ft)
- Population (2023): 181
  - Density: 16.1/km^{2} (41.6/sq mi)
- Time zone: UTC+01:00 (CET)
  - Summer (DST): UTC+02:00 (CEST)
- INSEE/Postal code: 70488 /70160
- ^{1} French Land Register data, which excludes lakes, ponds, glaciers > 1 km^{2} (0.386 sq mi or 247 acres) and river estuaries.

Senoncourt is a commune in the Haute-Saône department in the region of Bourgogne-Franche-Comté in eastern France.

== See also ==
- Communes of the Haute-Saône department
