= Contréglise =

- Commune
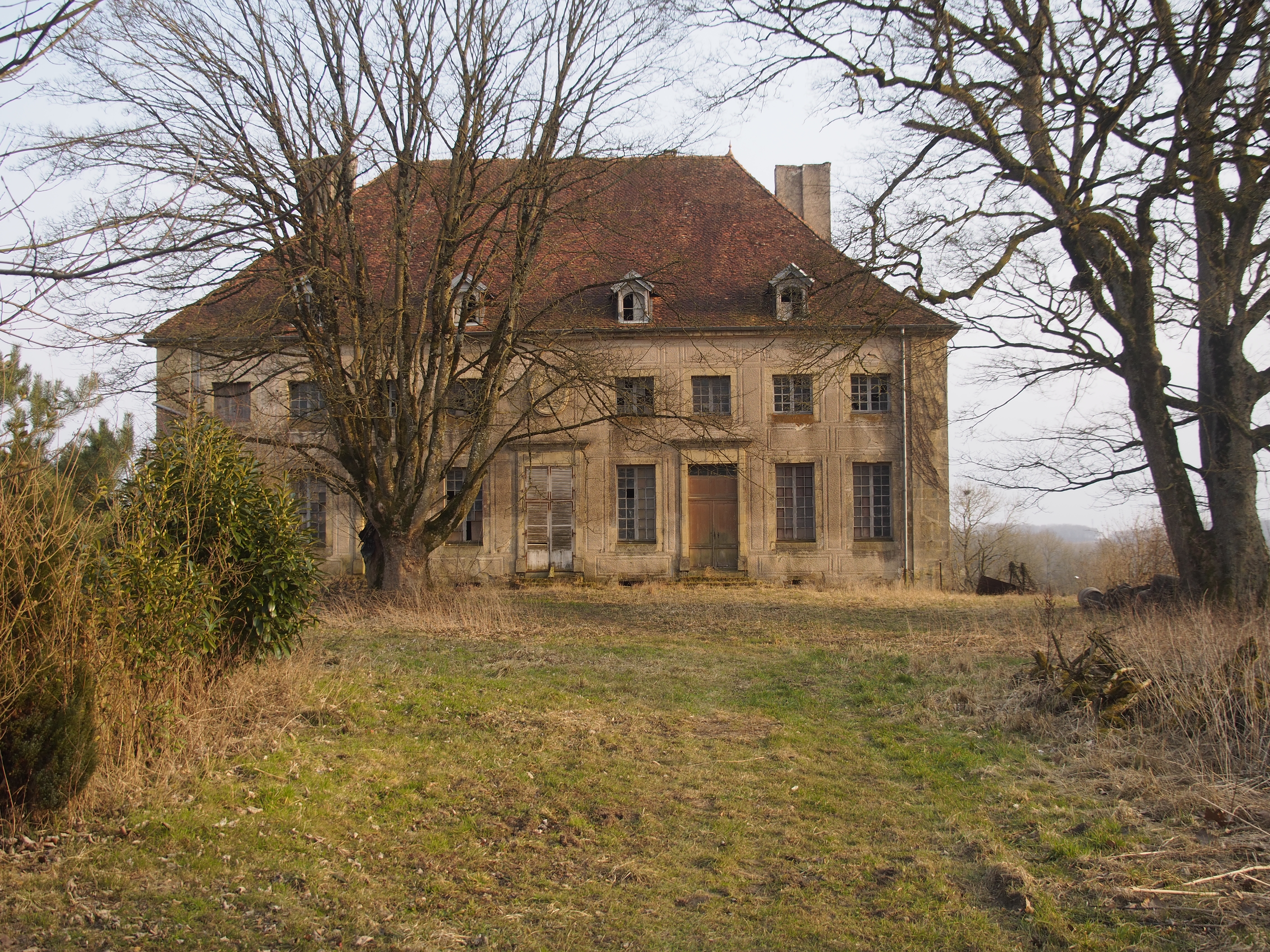
- The chateau in Contréglise

- Coat of arms
- Location of Contréglise
- Location within France Location within Bourgogne-Franche-Comté
- Coordinates: 47°49′36″N 6°02′14″E
- Country: France
- Region: Bourgogne-Franche-Comté
- Department: Haute-Saône
- Arrondissement: Vesoul
- Canton: Port-sur-Saône

Government
  - Mayor (2021–2026): David Chevallier
- Area^{1}: 9.61 km^{2} (3.71 sq mi)
- Highest elevation: 348 m (1,142 ft)
- Lowest elevation: 223 m (732 ft)
- Population (2023): 111
  - Density: 11.6/km^{2} (29.9/sq mi)
- Time zone: UTC+01:00 (CET)
  - Summer (DST): UTC+02:00 (CEST)
- INSEE/Postal code: 70170 /70160
- ^{1} French Land Register data, which excludes lakes, ponds, glaciers > 1 km^{2} (0.386 sq mi or 247 acres) and river estuaries.

Contréglise (French pronunciation: [kɔ̃tʁeɡliz]) is a commune in the Haute-Saône department in the region of Bourgogne-Franche-Comté in eastern France.

== See also ==
- Communes of the Haute-Saône department
