= Anjeux =

- Commune
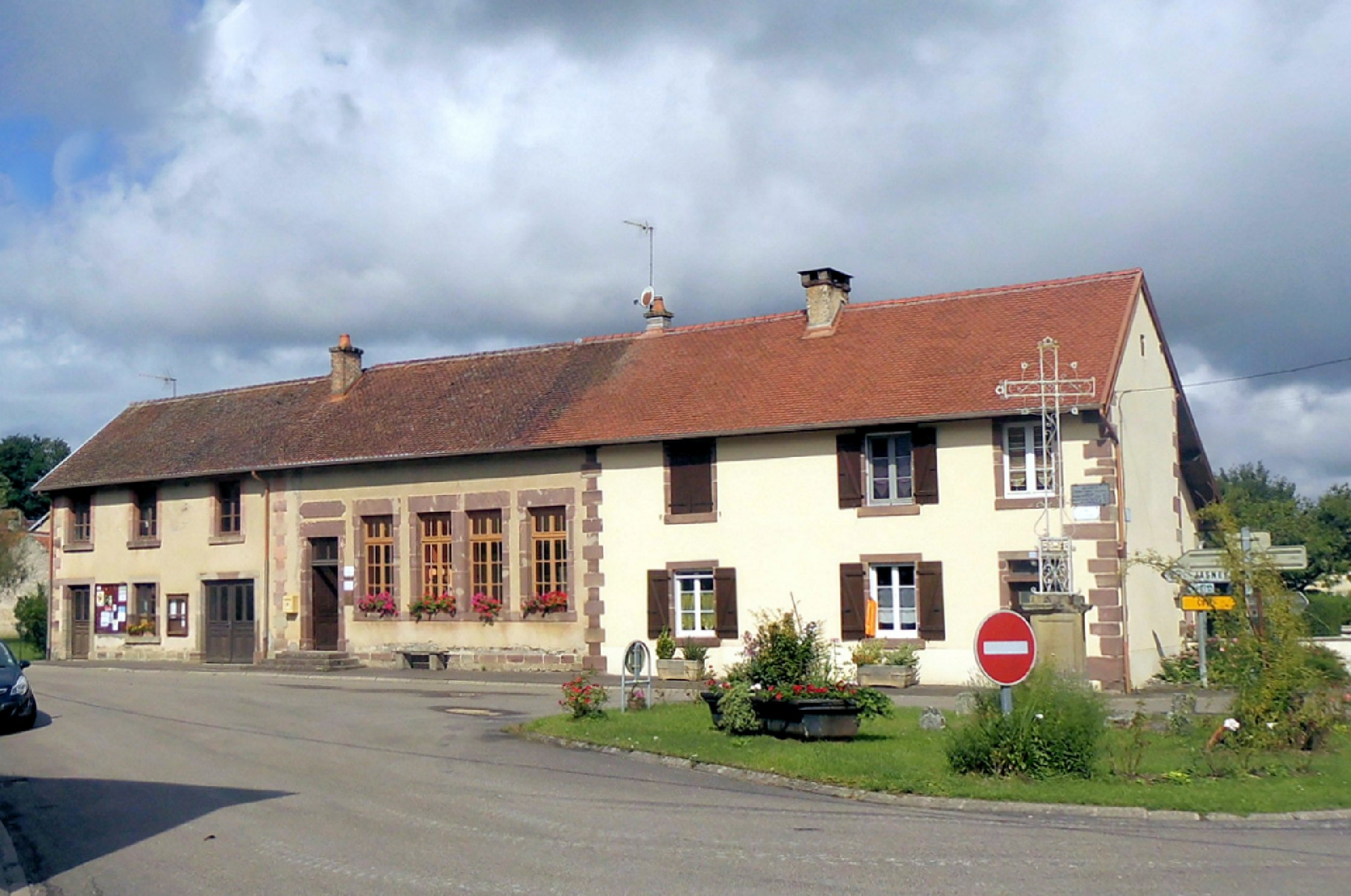
- The town hall and school in Anjeux

- Coat of arms
- Location of Anjeux
- Location within France Location within Bourgogne-Franche-Comté
- Coordinates: 47°52′53″N 6°12′34″E
- Country: France
- Region: Bourgogne-Franche-Comté
- Department: Haute-Saône
- Arrondissement: Lure
- Canton: Port-sur-Saône
- Intercommunality: Haute Comté

Government
  - Mayor (2020–2026): Sylvain Petitgenet
- Area^{1}: 8.71 km^{2} (3.36 sq mi)
- Highest elevation: 303 m (994 ft)
- Lowest elevation: 227 m (745 ft)
- Population (2023): 148
  - Density: 17.0/km^{2} (44.0/sq mi)
- Time zone: UTC+01:00 (CET)
  - Summer (DST): UTC+02:00 (CEST)
- INSEE/Postal code: 70023 /70800
- ^{1} French Land Register data, which excludes lakes, ponds, glaciers > 1 km^{2} (0.386 sq mi or 247 acres) and river estuaries.

Anjeux (French pronunciation: [ɑ̃ʒø]) is a commune in the Haute-Saône department in the region of Bourgogne-Franche-Comté in eastern France.

== See also ==
- Communes of the Haute-Saône department
