= Saponcourt =

- Commune
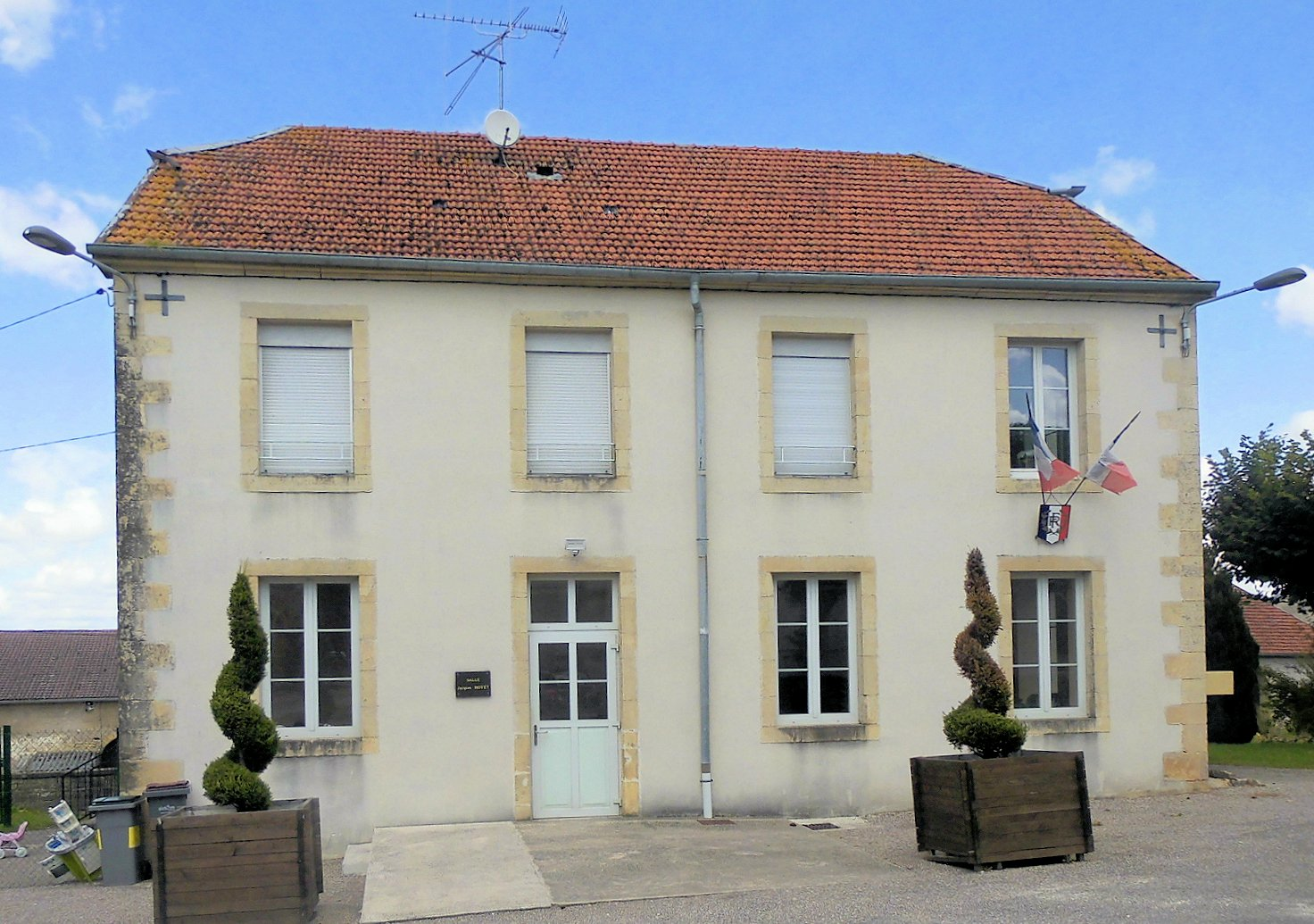
- The town hall in Saponcourt
- Location of Saponcourt
- Location within France Location within Bourgogne-Franche-Comté
- Coordinates: 47°52′22″N 6°01′41″E
- Country: France
- Region: Bourgogne-Franche-Comté
- Department: Haute-Saône
- Arrondissement: Vesoul
- Canton: Port-sur-Saône

Government
  - Mayor (2020–2026): Christine Etienne
- Area^{1}: 4.89 km^{2} (1.89 sq mi)
- Highest elevation: 348 m (1,142 ft)
- Lowest elevation: 235 m (771 ft)
- Population (2023): 78
  - Density: 16/km^{2} (41/sq mi)
- Time zone: UTC+01:00 (CET)
  - Summer (DST): UTC+02:00 (CEST)
- INSEE/Postal code: 70476 /70210
- ^{1} French Land Register data, which excludes lakes, ponds, glaciers > 1 km^{2} (0.386 sq mi or 247 acres) and river estuaries.

Saponcourt (French pronunciation: [sapɔ̃kuʁ]) is a commune in the Haute-Saône department in the region of Bourgogne-Franche-Comté in eastern France.

== See also ==
- Communes of the Haute-Saône department
