= Provenchère, Haute-Saône =

Provenchère
- Commune
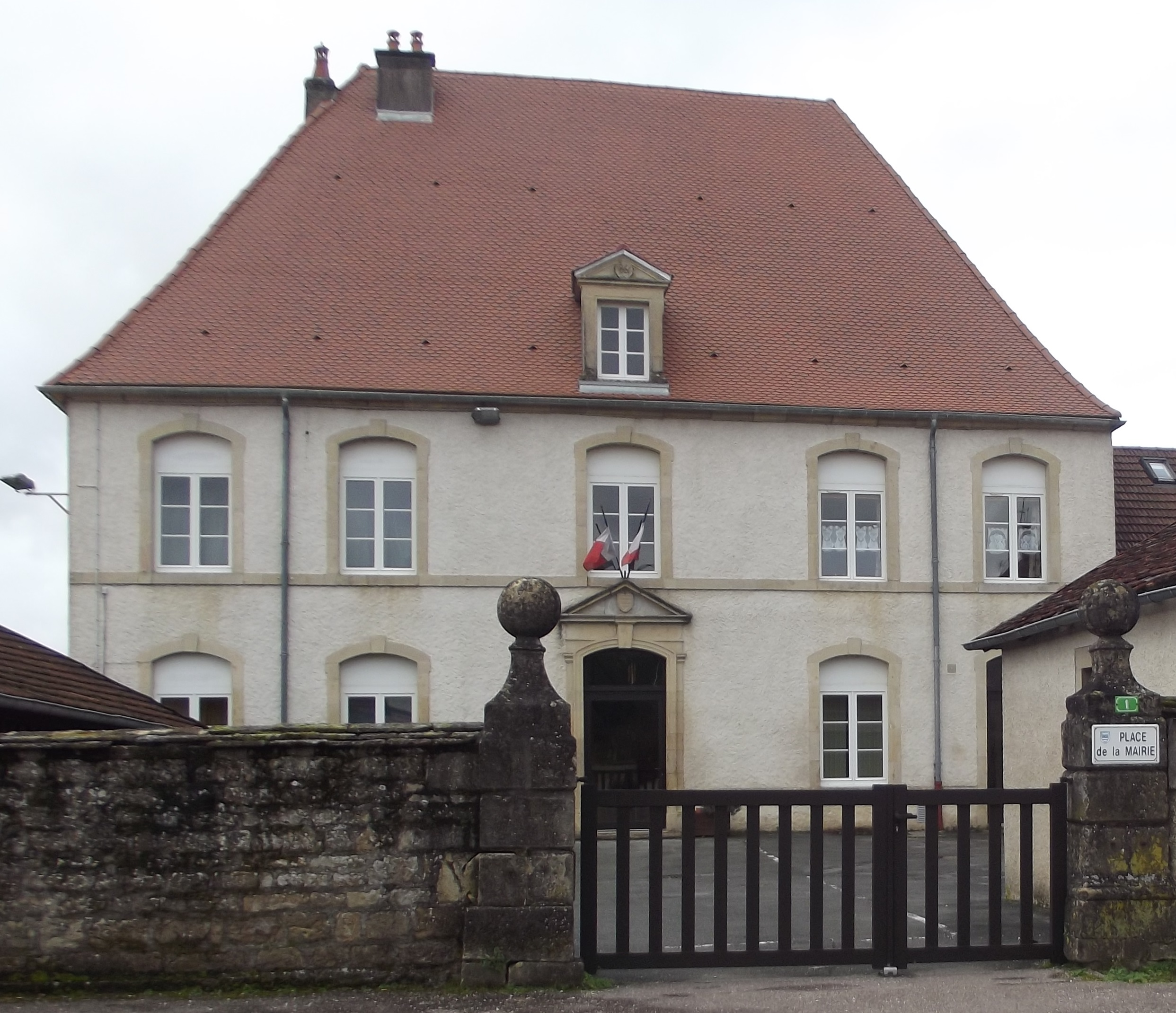
- The town hall in Provenchère

- Coat of arms
- Location of Provenchère
- Location within France Location within Bourgogne-Franche-Comté
- Coordinates: 47°43′24″N 6°07′39″E
- Country: France
- Region: Bourgogne-Franche-Comté
- Department: Haute-Saône
- Arrondissement: Vesoul
- Canton: Port-sur-Saône

Government
  - Mayor (2020–2026): Jean Levrey
- Area^{1}: 5.82 km^{2} (2.25 sq mi)
- Highest elevation: 364 m (1,194 ft)
- Lowest elevation: 255 m (837 ft)
- Population (2023): 235
  - Density: 40.4/km^{2} (105/sq mi)
- Time zone: UTC+01:00 (CET)
  - Summer (DST): UTC+02:00 (CEST)
- INSEE/Postal code: 70426 /70170
- ^{1} French Land Register data, which excludes lakes, ponds, glaciers > 1 km^{2} (0.386 sq mi or 247 acres) and river estuaries.

Provenchère (French pronunciation: [pʁɔvɑ̃ʃɛʁ]) is a commune in the Haute-Saône department in the region of Bourgogne-Franche-Comté in eastern France.

== See also ==
- Communes of the Haute-Saône department
