= Fontenois-la-Ville =

- Commune
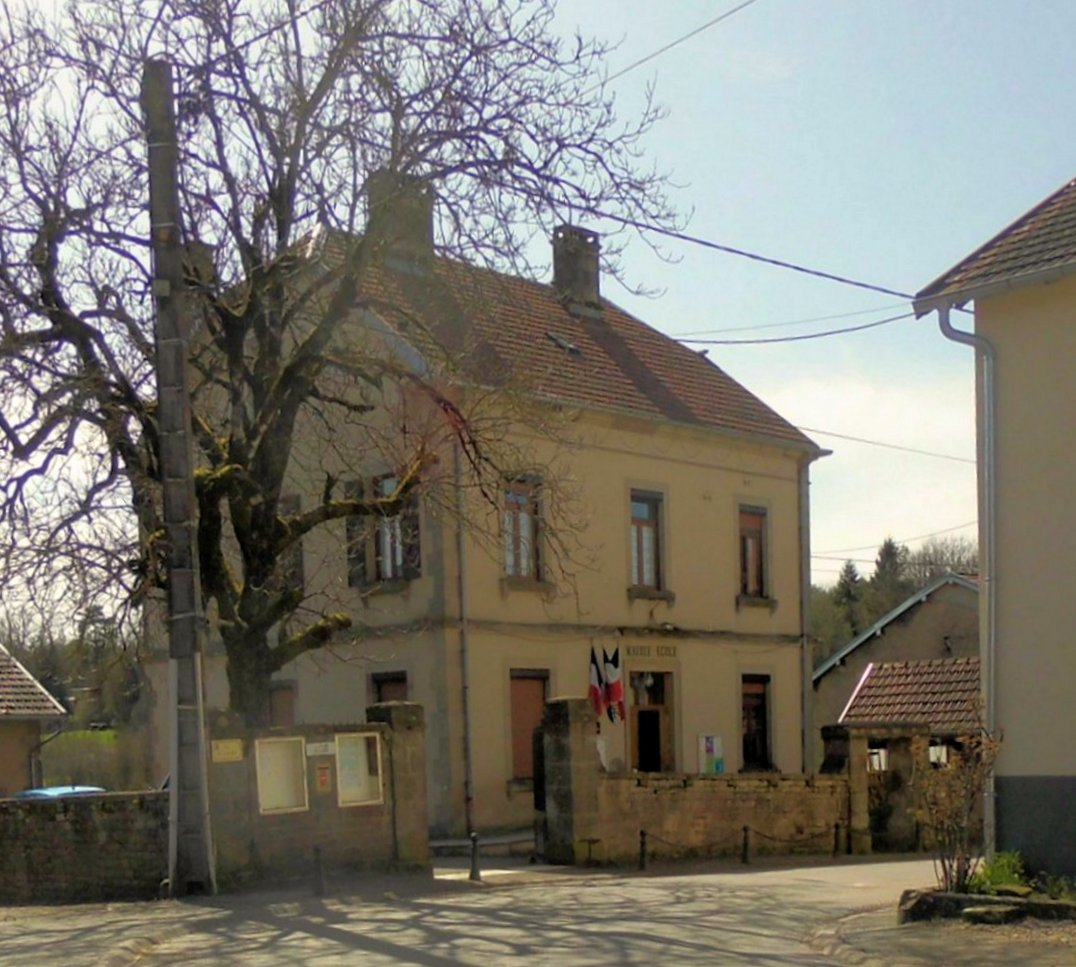
- The town hall in Fontenois-la-Ville
- Location of Fontenois-la-Ville
- Location within France Location within Bourgogne-Franche-Comté
- Coordinates: 47°55′59″N 6°09′56″E
- Country: France
- Region: Bourgogne-Franche-Comté
- Department: Haute-Saône
- Arrondissement: Lure
- Canton: Port-sur-Saône
- Area^{1}: 12.19 km^{2} (4.71 sq mi)
- Highest elevation: 333 m (1,093 ft)
- Lowest elevation: 243 m (797 ft)
- Population (2023): 142
  - Density: 11.6/km^{2} (30.2/sq mi)
- Time zone: UTC+01:00 (CET)
  - Summer (DST): UTC+02:00 (CEST)
- INSEE/Postal code: 70242 /70210
- ^{1} French Land Register data, which excludes lakes, ponds, glaciers > 1 km^{2} (0.386 sq mi or 247 acres) and river estuaries.

Fontenois-la-Ville (French pronunciation: [fɔ̃tnwa la vil]) is a commune in the Haute-Saône department in the region of Bourgogne-Franche-Comté in eastern France.

== See also ==
- Communes of the Haute-Saône department
