= Chaux-lès-Port =

- Commune
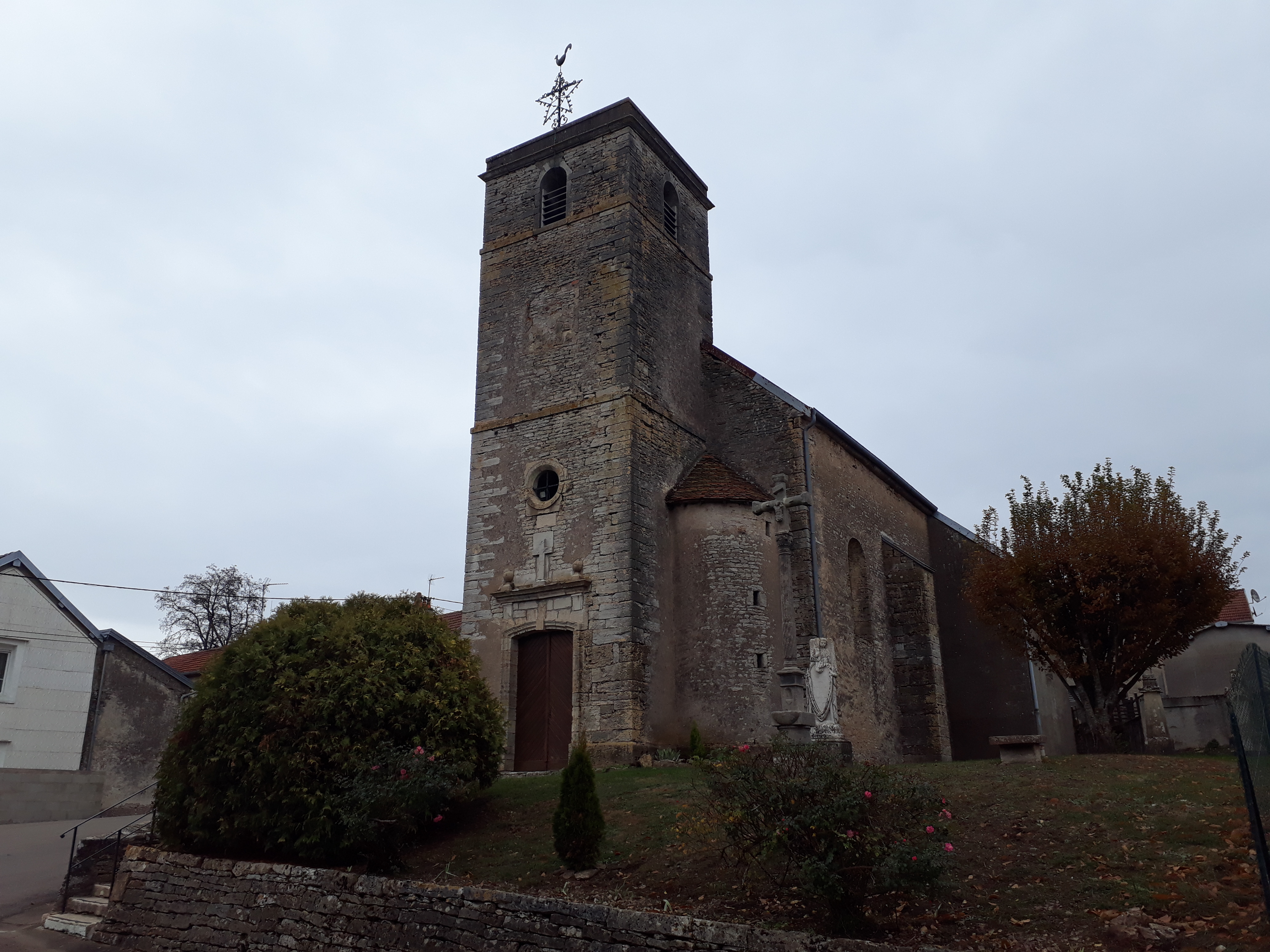
- The church in Chaux-lès-Port
- Location of Chaux-lès-Port
- Location within France Location within Bourgogne-Franche-Comté
- Coordinates: 47°42′57″N 6°02′13″E
- Country: France
- Region: Bourgogne-Franche-Comté
- Department: Haute-Saône
- Arrondissement: Vesoul
- Canton: Port-sur-Saône
- Area^{1}: 4.15 km^{2} (1.60 sq mi)
- Highest elevation: 277 m (909 ft)
- Lowest elevation: 206 m (676 ft)
- Population (2023): 158
  - Density: 38.1/km^{2} (98.6/sq mi)
- Time zone: UTC+01:00 (CET)
  - Summer (DST): UTC+02:00 (CEST)
- INSEE/Postal code: 70146 /70170
- ^{1} French Land Register data, which excludes lakes, ponds, glaciers > 1 km^{2} (0.386 sq mi or 247 acres) and river estuaries.

Chaux-lès-Port is a commune in the Haute-Saône department in the region of Bourgogne-Franche-Comté in eastern France.

== See also ==
- Communes of the Haute-Saône department
