= Équevilley =

- Commune
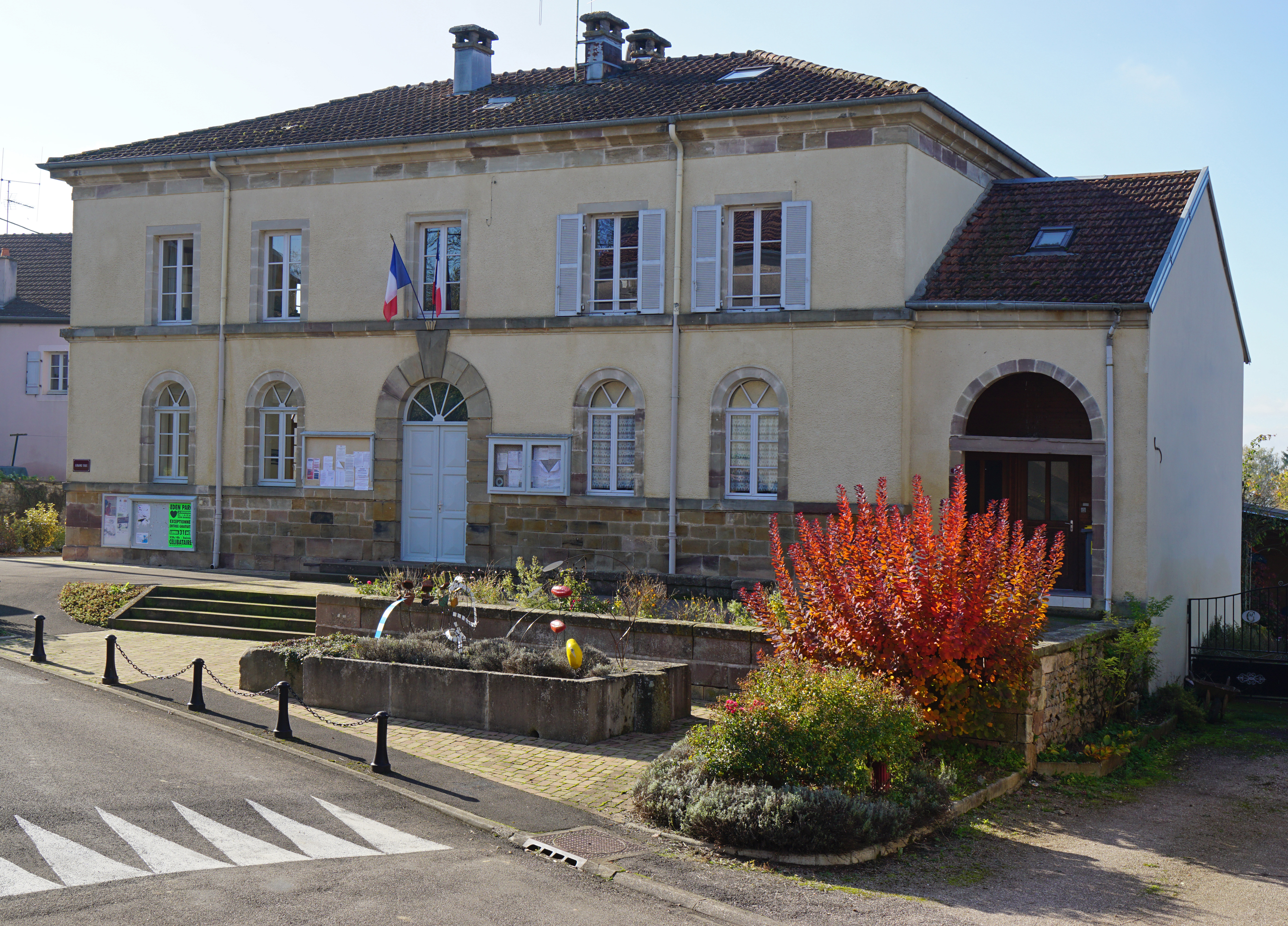
- The town hall in Équevilley

- Coat of arms
- Location of Équevilley
- Location within France Location within Bourgogne-Franche-Comté
- Coordinates: 47°46′14″N 6°11′02″E
- Country: France
- Region: Bourgogne-Franche-Comté
- Department: Haute-Saône
- Arrondissement: Vesoul
- Canton: Port-sur-Saône
- Area^{1}: 9.46 km^{2} (3.65 sq mi)
- Highest elevation: 336 m (1,102 ft)
- Lowest elevation: 222 m (728 ft)
- Population (2023): 121
  - Density: 12.8/km^{2} (33.1/sq mi)
- Time zone: UTC+01:00 (CET)
  - Summer (DST): UTC+02:00 (CEST)
- INSEE/Postal code: 70214 /70160
- ^{1} French Land Register data, which excludes lakes, ponds, glaciers > 1 km^{2} (0.386 sq mi or 247 acres) and river estuaries.

Équevilley is a commune in the Haute-Saône department in the region of Bourgogne-Franche-Comté in eastern France.

== See also ==
- Communes of the Haute-Saône department
