= Bouligney =

- Commune
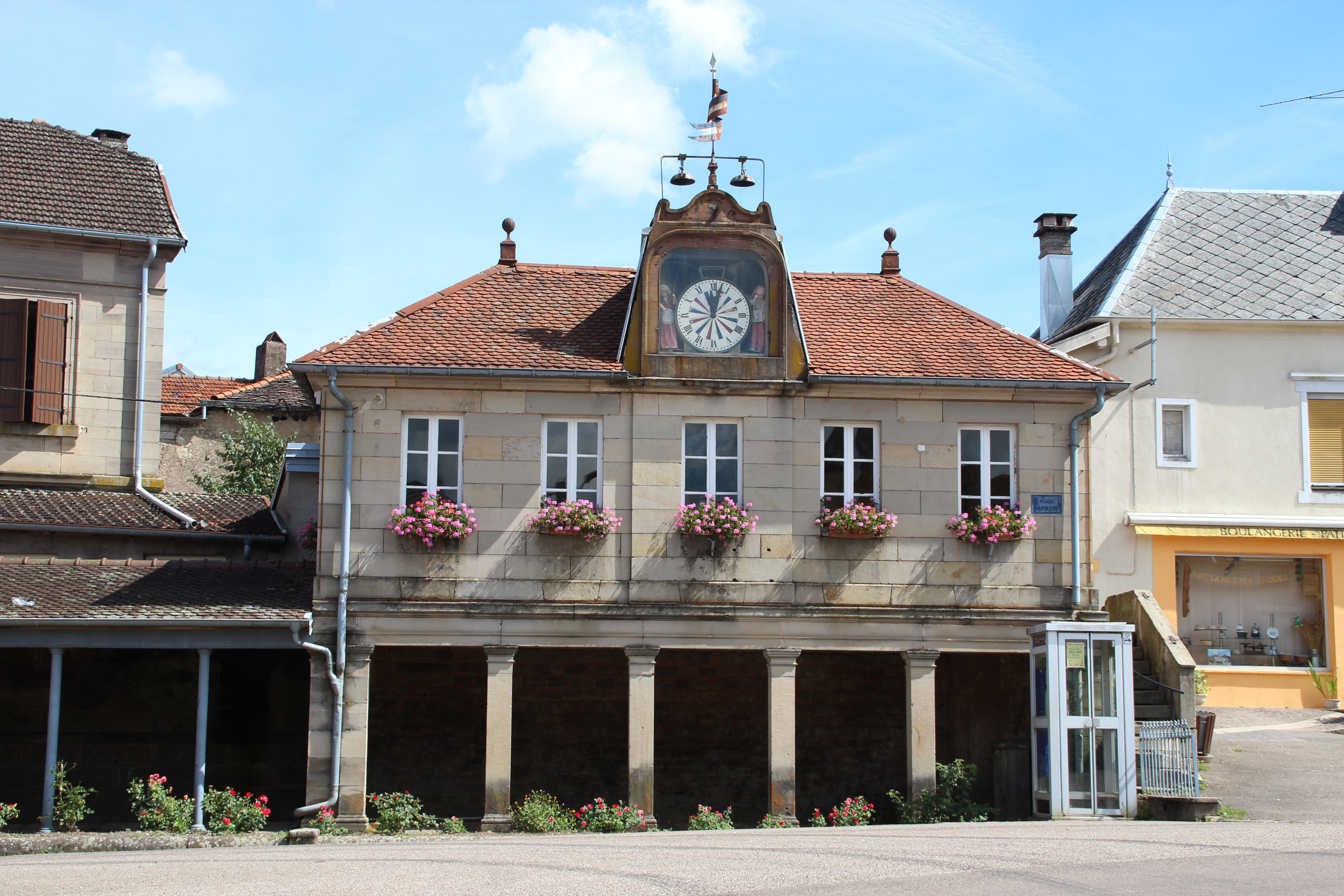
- The town hall in Bouligney
- Location of Bouligney
- Location within France Location within Bourgogne-Franche-Comté
- Coordinates: 47°53′45″N 6°14′29″E
- Country: France
- Region: Bourgogne-Franche-Comté
- Department: Haute-Saône
- Arrondissement: Lure
- Canton: Port-sur-Saône

Government
  - Mayor (2020–2026): Anthony Marie
- Area^{1}: 14.20 km^{2} (5.48 sq mi)
- Highest elevation: 357 m (1,171 ft)
- Lowest elevation: 231 m (758 ft)
- Population (2023): 401
  - Density: 28.2/km^{2} (73.1/sq mi)
- Time zone: UTC+01:00 (CET)
  - Summer (DST): UTC+02:00 (CEST)
- INSEE/Postal code: 70083 /70800
- ^{1} French Land Register data, which excludes lakes, ponds, glaciers > 1 km^{2} (0.386 sq mi or 247 acres) and river estuaries.

Bouligney (French pronunciation: [buliɲɛ]) is a commune in the Haute-Saône department in the region of Bourgogne-Franche-Comté in eastern France.

== See also ==
- Communes of the Haute-Saône department
