= Cuve =

- Commune
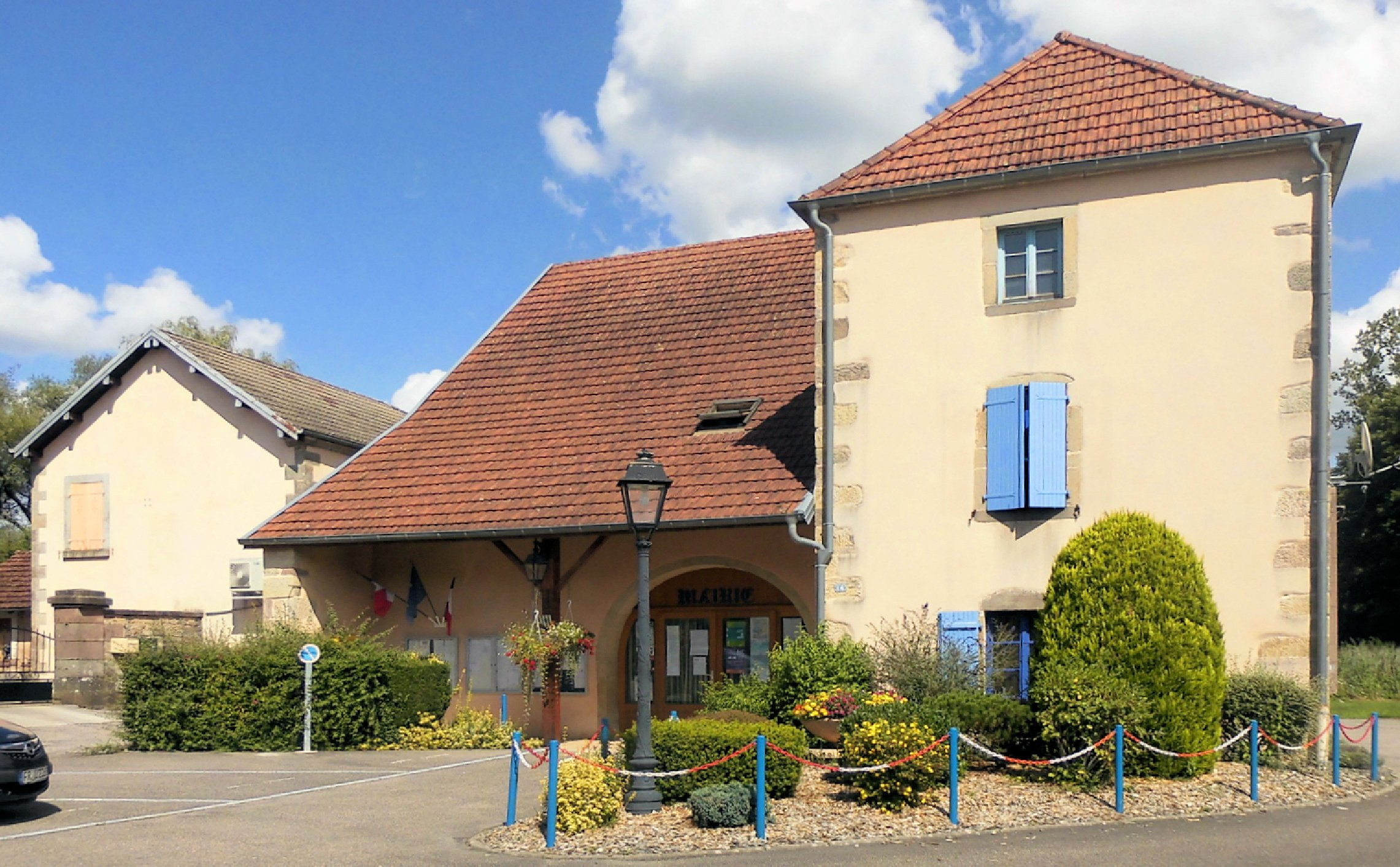
- The town hall in Cuve
- Location of Cuve
- Location within France Location within Bourgogne-Franche-Comté
- Coordinates: 47°54′15″N 6°13′19″E
- Country: France
- Region: Bourgogne-Franche-Comté
- Department: Haute-Saône
- Arrondissement: Lure
- Canton: Port-sur-Saône
- Area^{1}: 8.10 km^{2} (3.13 sq mi)
- Highest elevation: 335 m (1,099 ft)
- Lowest elevation: 232 m (761 ft)
- Population (2023): 128
  - Density: 15.8/km^{2} (40.9/sq mi)
- Time zone: UTC+01:00 (CET)
  - Summer (DST): UTC+02:00 (CEST)
- INSEE/Postal code: 70194 /70800
- ^{1} French Land Register data, which excludes lakes, ponds, glaciers > 1 km^{2} (0.386 sq mi or 247 acres) and river estuaries.

Cuve (French pronunciation: [kyv]) is a commune in the Haute-Saône department in the region of Bourgogne-Franche-Comté in eastern France.

== See also ==
- Communes of the Haute-Saône department
