= Bougnon =

- Commune
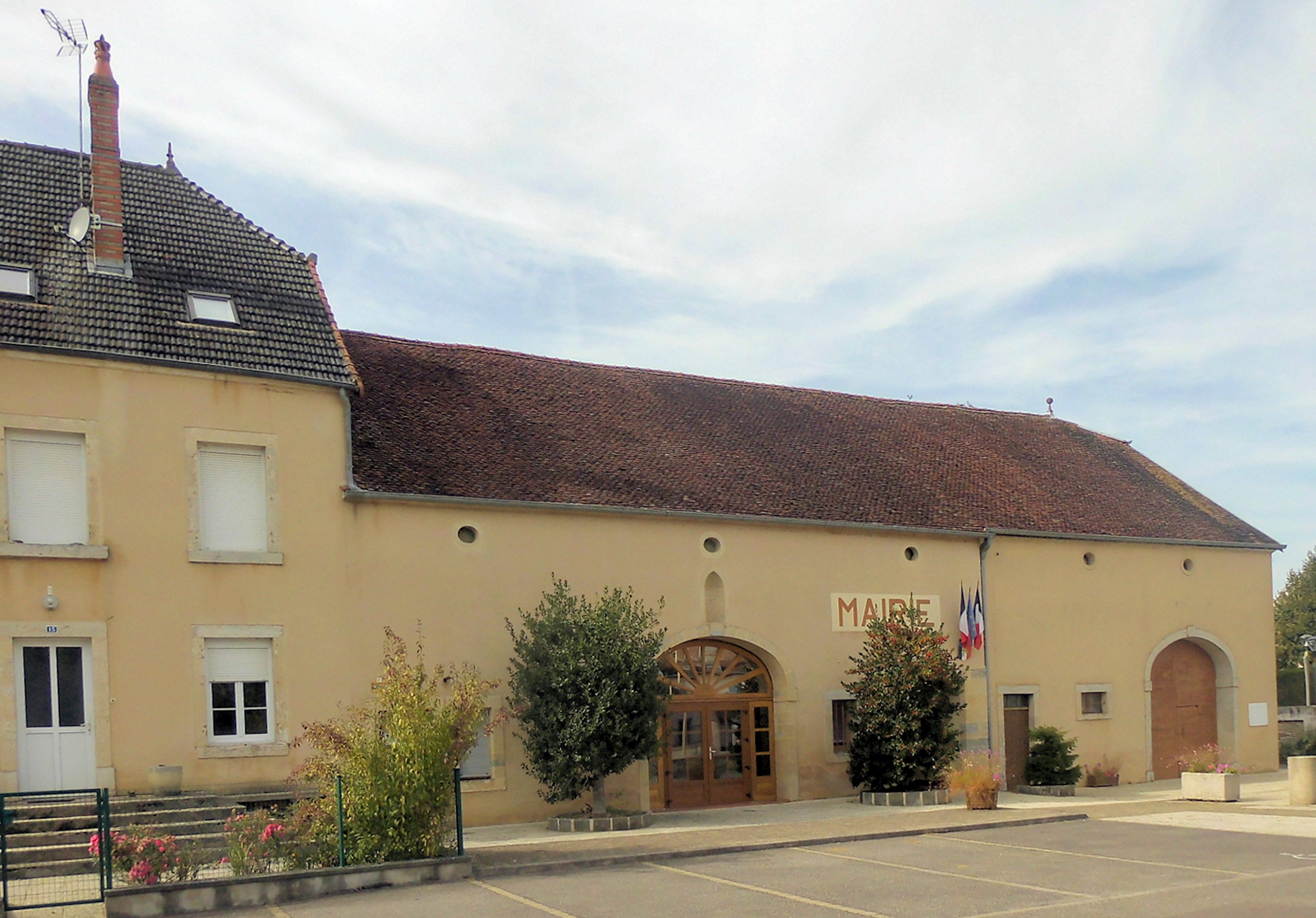
- The town hall in Bougnon

- Coat of arms
- Location of Bougnon
- Location within France Location within Bourgogne-Franche-Comté
- Coordinates: 47°41′36″N 6°06′34″E
- Country: France
- Region: Bourgogne-Franche-Comté
- Department: Haute-Saône
- Arrondissement: Vesoul
- Canton: Port-sur-Saône

Government
  - Mayor (2020–2026): Didier Hugedet
- Area^{1}: 9.18 km^{2} (3.54 sq mi)
- Highest elevation: 345 m (1,132 ft)
- Lowest elevation: 233 m (764 ft)
- Population (2023): 495
  - Density: 53.9/km^{2} (140/sq mi)
- Time zone: UTC+01:00 (CET)
  - Summer (DST): UTC+02:00 (CEST)
- INSEE/Postal code: 70079 /70170
- ^{1} French Land Register data, which excludes lakes, ponds, glaciers > 1 km^{2} (0.386 sq mi or 247 acres) and river estuaries.

Bougnon (French pronunciation: [buɲɔ̃]) is a commune in the Haute-Saône department in the region of Bourgogne-Franche-Comté in eastern France.

== See also ==
- Communes of the Haute-Saône department
