= Grattery =

- Commune
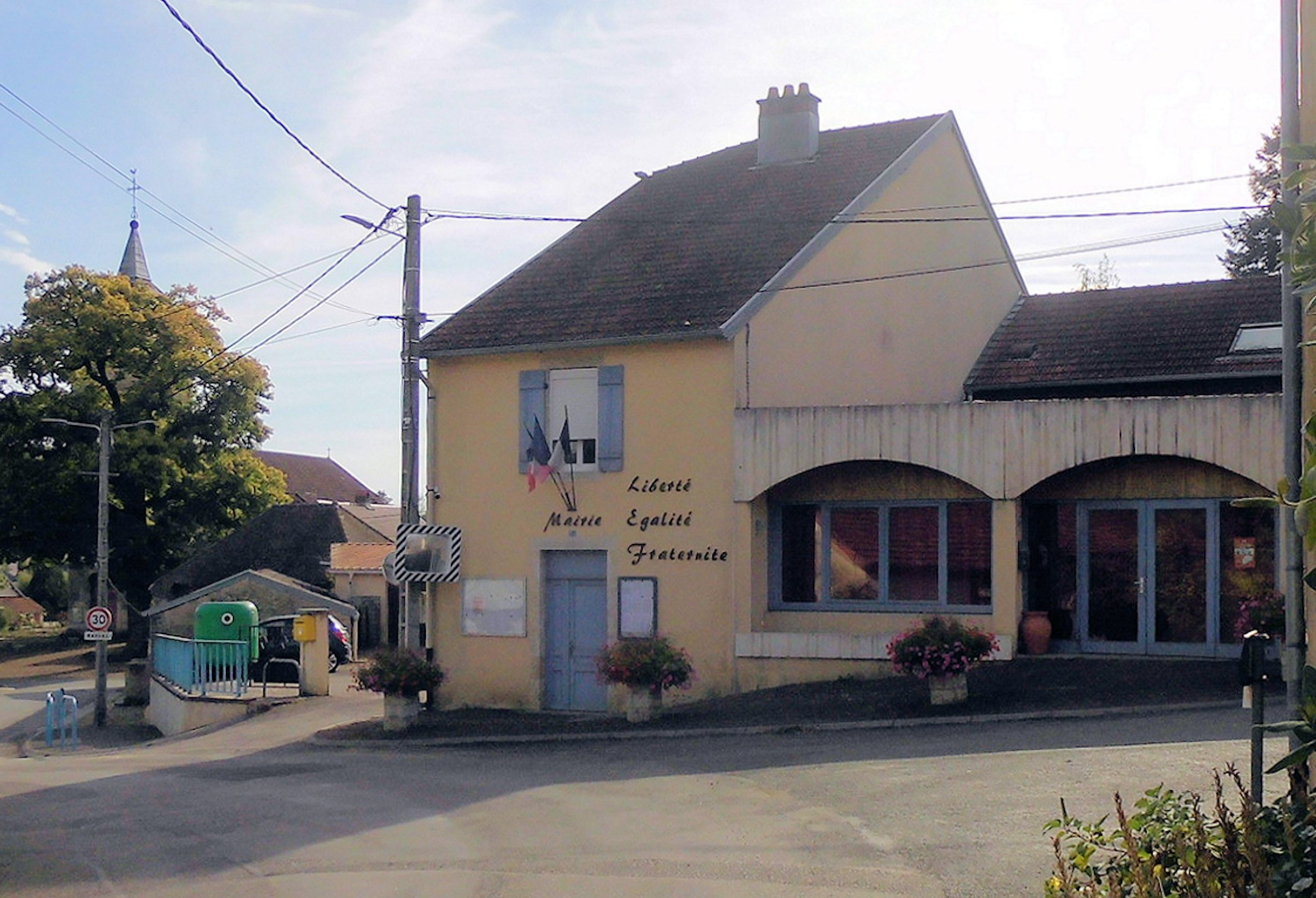
- The town hall in Grattery

- Coat of arms
- Location of Grattery
- Location within France Location within Bourgogne-Franche-Comté
- Coordinates: 47°40′17″N 6°04′46″E
- Country: France
- Region: Bourgogne-Franche-Comté
- Department: Haute-Saône
- Arrondissement: Vesoul
- Canton: Port-sur-Saône

Government
  - Mayor (2020–2026): Jérôme Lallemand
- Area^{1}: 6.19 km^{2} (2.39 sq mi)
- Highest elevation: 296 m (971 ft)
- Lowest elevation: 218 m (715 ft)
- Population (2023): 217
  - Density: 35.1/km^{2} (90.8/sq mi)
- Time zone: UTC+01:00 (CET)
  - Summer (DST): UTC+02:00 (CEST)
- INSEE/Postal code: 70278 /70170
- ^{1} French Land Register data, which excludes lakes, ponds, glaciers > 1 km^{2} (0.386 sq mi or 247 acres) and river estuaries.

Grattery (French pronunciation: [ɡʁatʁi]) is a commune in the Haute-Saône department in the region of Bourgogne-Franche-Comté in eastern France.

== See also ==
- Communes of the Haute-Saône department
