= Le Val-Saint-Éloi =

- Commune
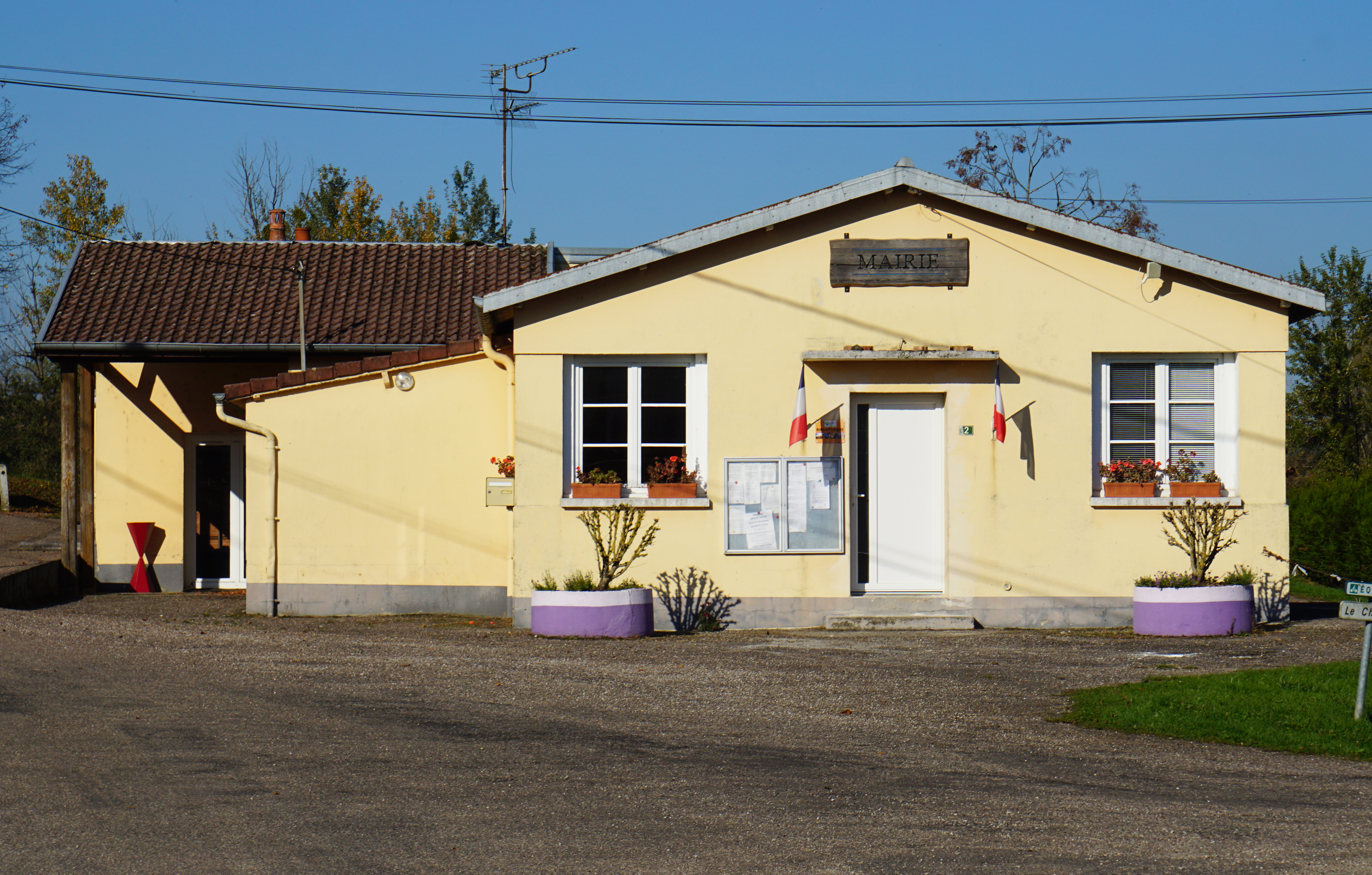
- The town hall in Le Val-Saint-Éloi
- Location of Le Val-Saint-Éloi
- Location within France Location within Bourgogne-Franche-Comté
- Coordinates: 47°44′15″N 6°11′02″E
- Country: France
- Region: Bourgogne-Franche-Comté
- Department: Haute-Saône
- Arrondissement: Vesoul
- Canton: Port-sur-Saône

Government
  - Mayor (2020–2026): David Seimpère
- Area^{1}: 7.06 km^{2} (2.73 sq mi)
- Highest elevation: 417 m (1,368 ft)
- Lowest elevation: 257 m (843 ft)
- Population (2023): 94
  - Density: 13/km^{2} (34/sq mi)
- Time zone: UTC+01:00 (CET)
  - Summer (DST): UTC+02:00 (CEST)
- INSEE/Postal code: 70518 /70160
- ^{1} French Land Register data, which excludes lakes, ponds, glaciers > 1 km^{2} (0.386 sq mi or 247 acres) and river estuaries.

Le Val-Saint-Éloi (French pronunciation: [lə val sɛ̃t‿elwa]) is a commune in the Haute-Saône department in the region of Bourgogne-Franche-Comté in eastern France.

== See also ==
- Communes of the Haute-Saône department
