= Polaincourt-et-Clairefontaine =

- Commune
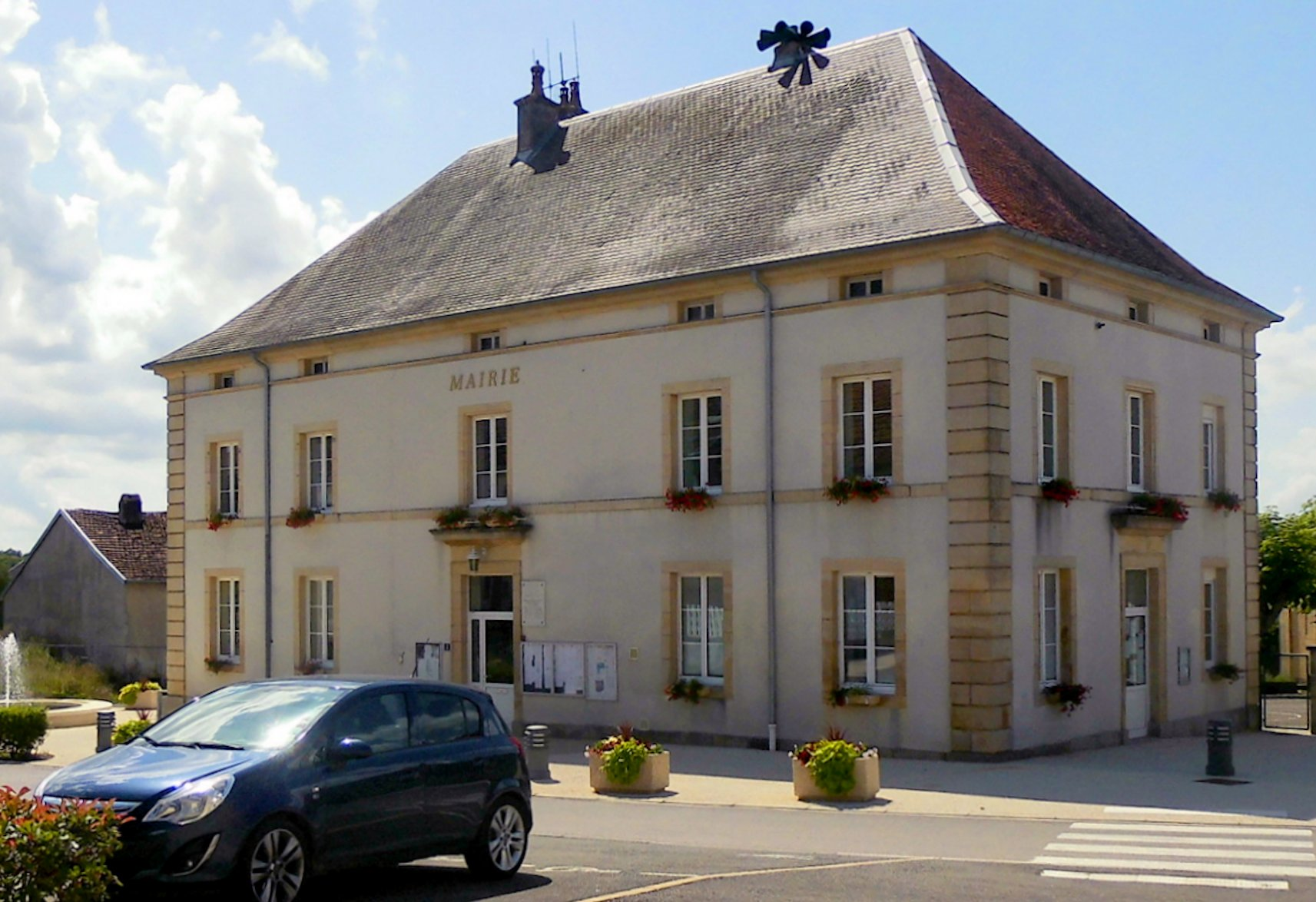
- The town hall in Polaincourt-et-Clairefontaine

- Coat of arms
- Location of Polaincourt-et-Clairefontaine
- Location within France Location within Bourgogne-Franche-Comté
- Coordinates: 47°53′05″N 6°04′14″E
- Country: France
- Region: Bourgogne-Franche-Comté
- Department: Haute-Saône
- Arrondissement: Vesoul
- Canton: Port-sur-Saône

Government
  - Mayor (2020–2026): Luc Simonel
- Area^{1}: 21.40 km^{2} (8.26 sq mi)
- Highest elevation: 362 m (1,188 ft)
- Lowest elevation: 228 m (748 ft)
- Population (2023): 592
  - Density: 27.7/km^{2} (71.6/sq mi)
- Time zone: UTC+01:00 (CET)
  - Summer (DST): UTC+02:00 (CEST)
- INSEE/Postal code: 70415 /70210
- ^{1} French Land Register data, which excludes lakes, ponds, glaciers > 1 km^{2} (0.386 sq mi or 247 acres) and river estuaries.

Polaincourt-et-Clairefontaine (French pronunciation: [pɔlɛ̃kuʁ e klɛʁfɔ̃tɛn]) is a commune in the Haute-Saône department in the region of Bourgogne-Franche-Comté in eastern France.

== See also ==
- Communes of the Haute-Saône department
