= Anchenoncourt-et-Chazel =

- Commune
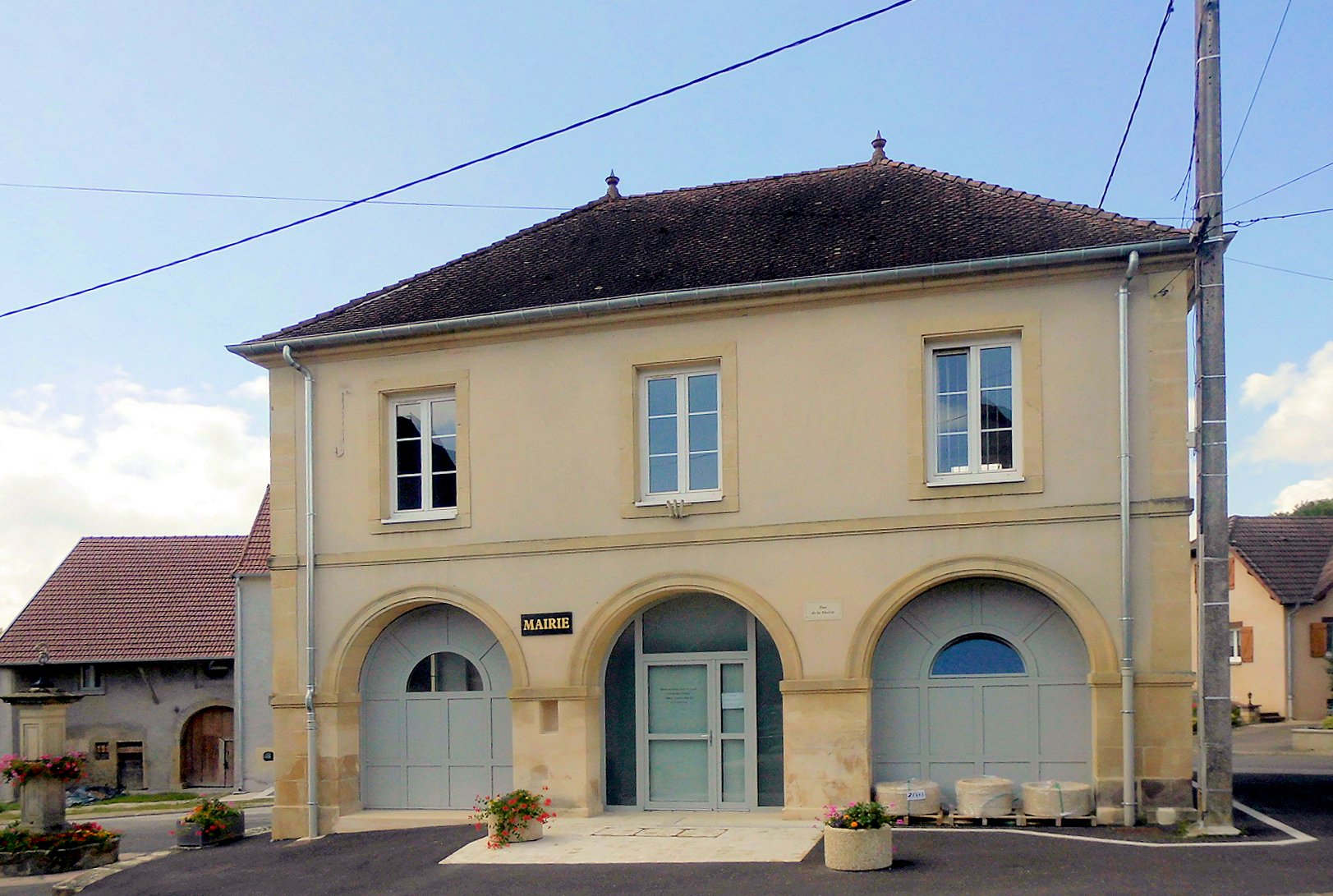
- The town hall in Anchenoncourt-et-Chazel
- Location of Anchenoncourt-et-Chazel
- Location within France Location within Bourgogne-Franche-Comté
- Coordinates: 47°51′59″N 6°06′55″E
- Country: France
- Region: Bourgogne-Franche-Comté
- Department: Haute-Saône
- Arrondissement: Vesoul
- Canton: Port-sur-Saône
- Intercommunality: Haute Comté

Government
  - Mayor (2020–2026): Michel Delaitre
- Area^{1}: 13.91 km^{2} (5.37 sq mi)
- Highest elevation: 355 m (1,165 ft)
- Lowest elevation: 227 m (745 ft)
- Population (2023): 224
  - Density: 16.1/km^{2} (41.7/sq mi)
- Time zone: UTC+01:00 (CET)
  - Summer (DST): UTC+02:00 (CEST)
- INSEE/Postal code: 70017 /70210
- ^{1} French Land Register data, which excludes lakes, ponds, glaciers > 1 km^{2} (0.386 sq mi or 247 acres) and river estuaries.

Anchenoncourt-et-Chazel (French pronunciation: [ɑ̃ʃnɔ̃kuʁ e ʃazɛl]) is a commune in the Haute-Saône department in the region of Bourgogne-Franche-Comté in eastern France.

== See also ==
- Communes of the Haute-Saône department
