= Vauchoux =

- Commune
- Location of Vauchoux
- Location within France Location within Bourgogne-Franche-Comté
- Coordinates: 47°39′47″N 6°01′40″E
- Country: France
- Region: Bourgogne-Franche-Comté
- Department: Haute-Saône
- Arrondissement: Vesoul
- Canton: Port-sur-Saône

Government
  - Mayor (2020–2026): Patrick Segura
- Area^{1}: 4.64 km^{2} (1.79 sq mi)
- Highest elevation: 262 m (860 ft)
- Lowest elevation: 206 m (676 ft)
- Population (2023): 127
  - Density: 27.4/km^{2} (70.9/sq mi)
- Time zone: UTC+01:00 (CET)
  - Summer (DST): UTC+02:00 (CEST)
- INSEE/Postal code: 70524 /70170
- ^{1} French Land Register data, which excludes lakes, ponds, glaciers > 1 km^{2} (0.386 sq mi or 247 acres) and river estuaries.

Vauchoux (French pronunciation: [voʃu]) is a commune in the Haute-Saône department in the region of Bourgogne-Franche-Comté in eastern France.

== See also ==
- Communes of the Haute-Saône department
