= Girefontaine =

- Commune
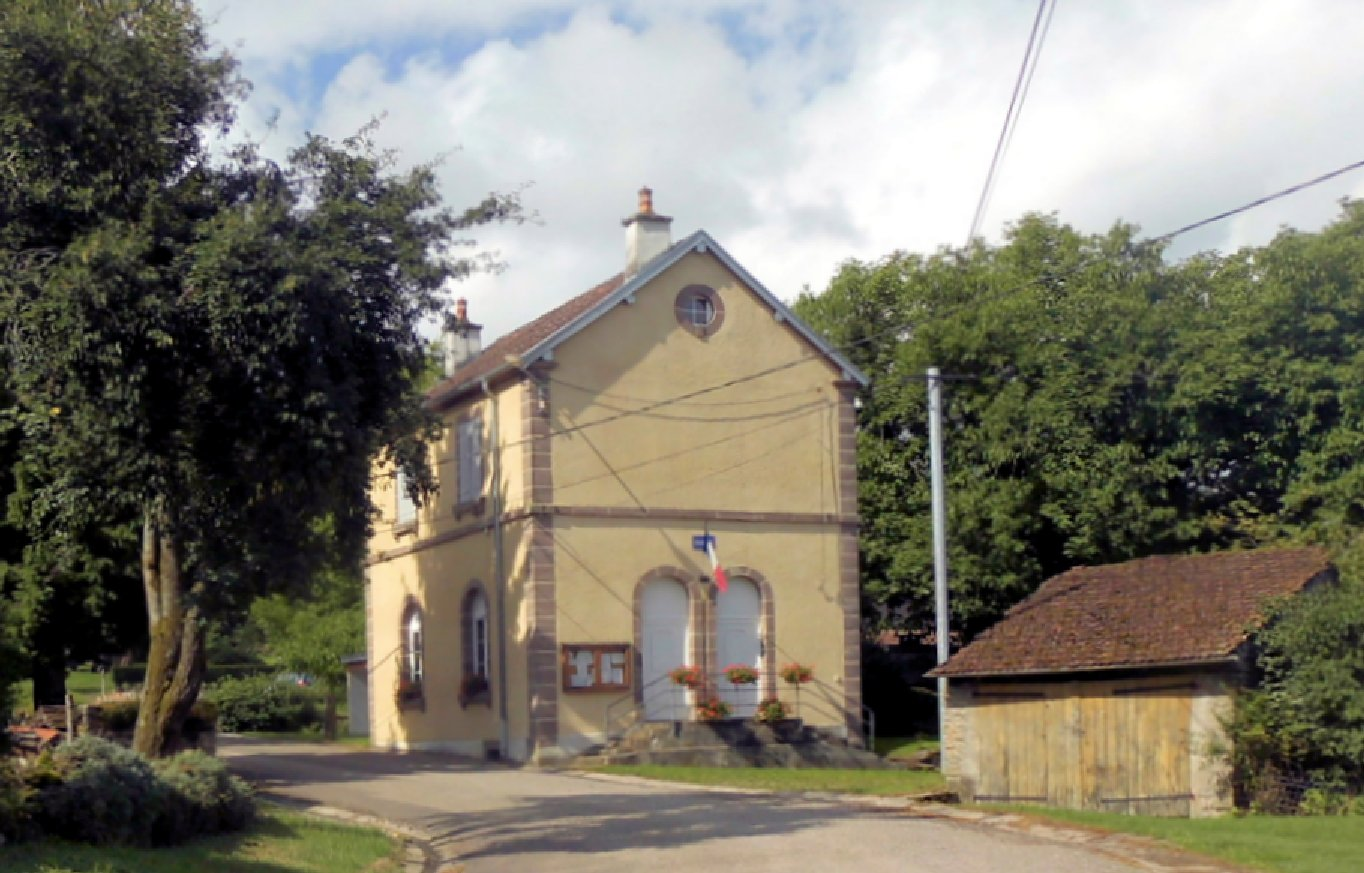
- The town hall in Girefontaine
- Location of Girefontaine
- Location within France Location within Bourgogne-Franche-Comté
- Coordinates: 47°53′41″N 6°10′34″E
- Country: France
- Region: Bourgogne-Franche-Comté
- Department: Haute-Saône
- Arrondissement: Lure
- Canton: Port-sur-Saône

Government
  - Mayor (2024–2026): Muriel Goudot
- Area^{1}: 3.56 km^{2} (1.37 sq mi)
- Highest elevation: 331 m (1,086 ft)
- Lowest elevation: 248 m (814 ft)
- Population (2023): 30
  - Density: 8.4/km^{2} (22/sq mi)
- Time zone: UTC+01:00 (CET)
  - Summer (DST): UTC+02:00 (CEST)
- INSEE/Postal code: 70269 /70210
- ^{1} French Land Register data, which excludes lakes, ponds, glaciers > 1 km^{2} (0.386 sq mi or 247 acres) and river estuaries.

Girefontaine (French pronunciation: [ʒiʁfɔ̃tɛn]) is a commune in the Haute-Saône department in the region of Bourgogne-Franche-Comté in eastern France.

== See also ==
- Communes of the Haute-Saône department
