= Vauvillers =

Vauvillers may refer to:

- Vauvillers, Haute-Saône, a commune in the French region of Franche-Comté
- Vauvillers, Somme, a commune in the French region of Picardie
