= Baulay =

- Commune
- Coat of arms
- Location of Baulay
- Location within France Location within Bourgogne-Franche-Comté
- Coordinates: 47°47′16″N 6°00′33″E
- Country: France
- Region: Bourgogne-Franche-Comté
- Department: Haute-Saône
- Arrondissement: Vesoul
- Canton: Port-sur-Saône

Government
  - Mayor (2020–2026): Frédéric Gerard
- Area^{1}: 8.22 km^{2} (3.17 sq mi)
- Highest elevation: 292 m (958 ft)
- Lowest elevation: 210 m (690 ft)
- Population (2023): 322
  - Density: 39.2/km^{2} (101/sq mi)
- Time zone: UTC+01:00 (CET)
  - Summer (DST): UTC+02:00 (CEST)
- INSEE/Postal code: 70056 /70160
- ^{1} French Land Register data, which excludes lakes, ponds, glaciers > 1 km^{2} (0.386 sq mi or 247 acres) and river estuaries.

Baulay (French pronunciation: [bolɛ]) is a commune in the Haute-Saône department in the region of Bourgogne-Franche-Comté in eastern France.

== See also ==
- Communes of the Haute-Saône department
