= Auxon, Haute-Saône =

Auxon
- Commune
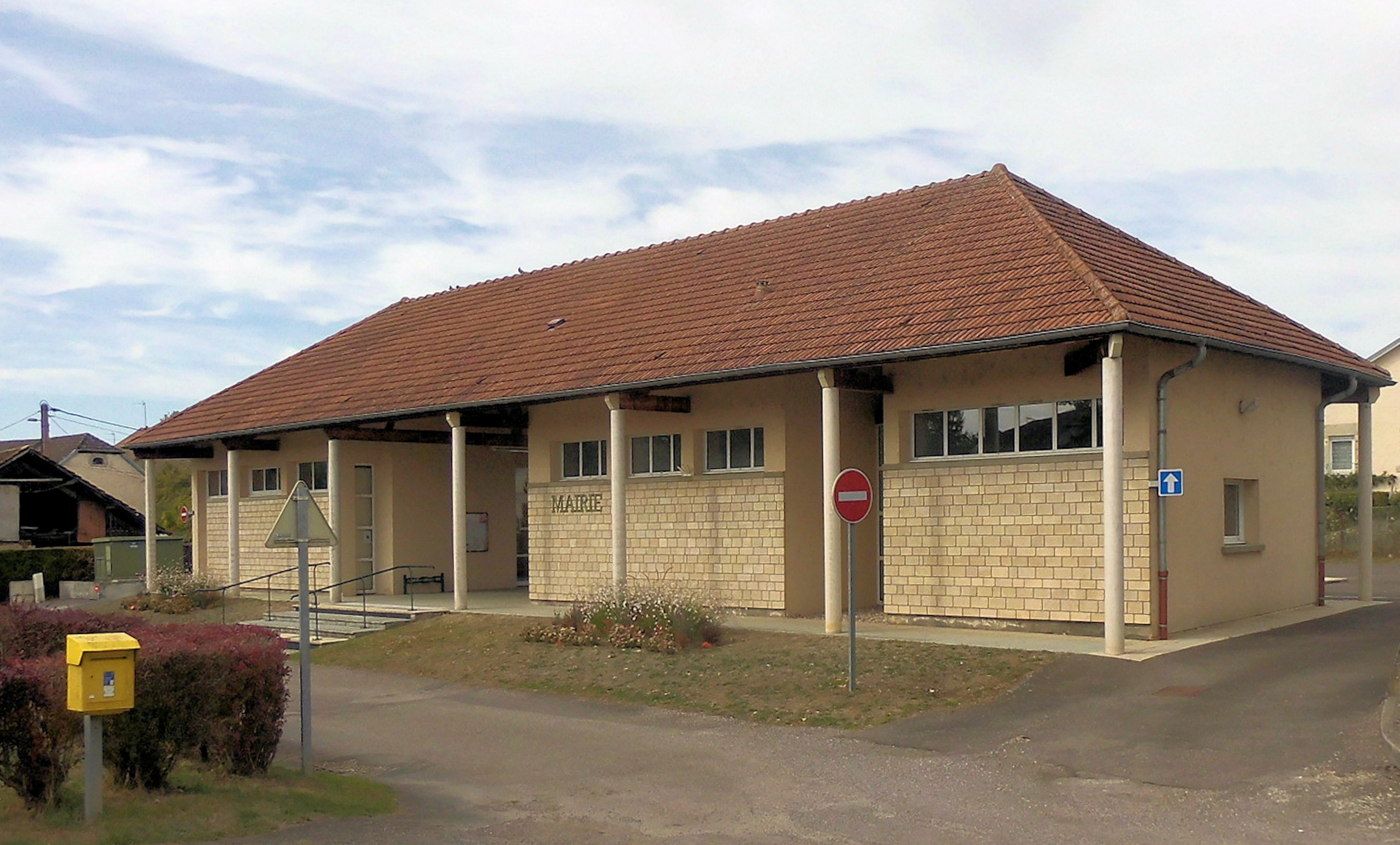
- The town hall in Auxon

- Coat of arms
- Location of Auxon
- Location within France Location within Bourgogne-Franche-Comté
- Coordinates: 47°40′58″N 6°09′57″E
- Country: France
- Region: Bourgogne-Franche-Comté
- Department: Haute-Saône
- Arrondissement: Vesoul
- Canton: Port-sur-Saône
- Intercommunality: CC Terres Saône

Government
  - Mayor (2020–2026): Isabelle Franck-Grandidier
- Area^{1}: 12.51 km^{2} (4.83 sq mi)
- Highest elevation: 339 m (1,112 ft)
- Lowest elevation: 229 m (751 ft)
- Population (2023): 398
  - Density: 31.8/km^{2} (82.4/sq mi)
- Time zone: UTC+01:00 (CET)
  - Summer (DST): UTC+02:00 (CEST)
- INSEE/Postal code: 70044 /70000
- ^{1} French Land Register data, which excludes lakes, ponds, glaciers > 1 km^{2} (0.386 sq mi or 247 acres) and river estuaries.

Auxon is a commune in the Haute-Saône department in the region of Bourgogne-Franche-Comté in eastern France.

== See also ==
- Communes of the Haute-Saône department
