= Flagy, Haute-Saône =

Flagy
- Commune
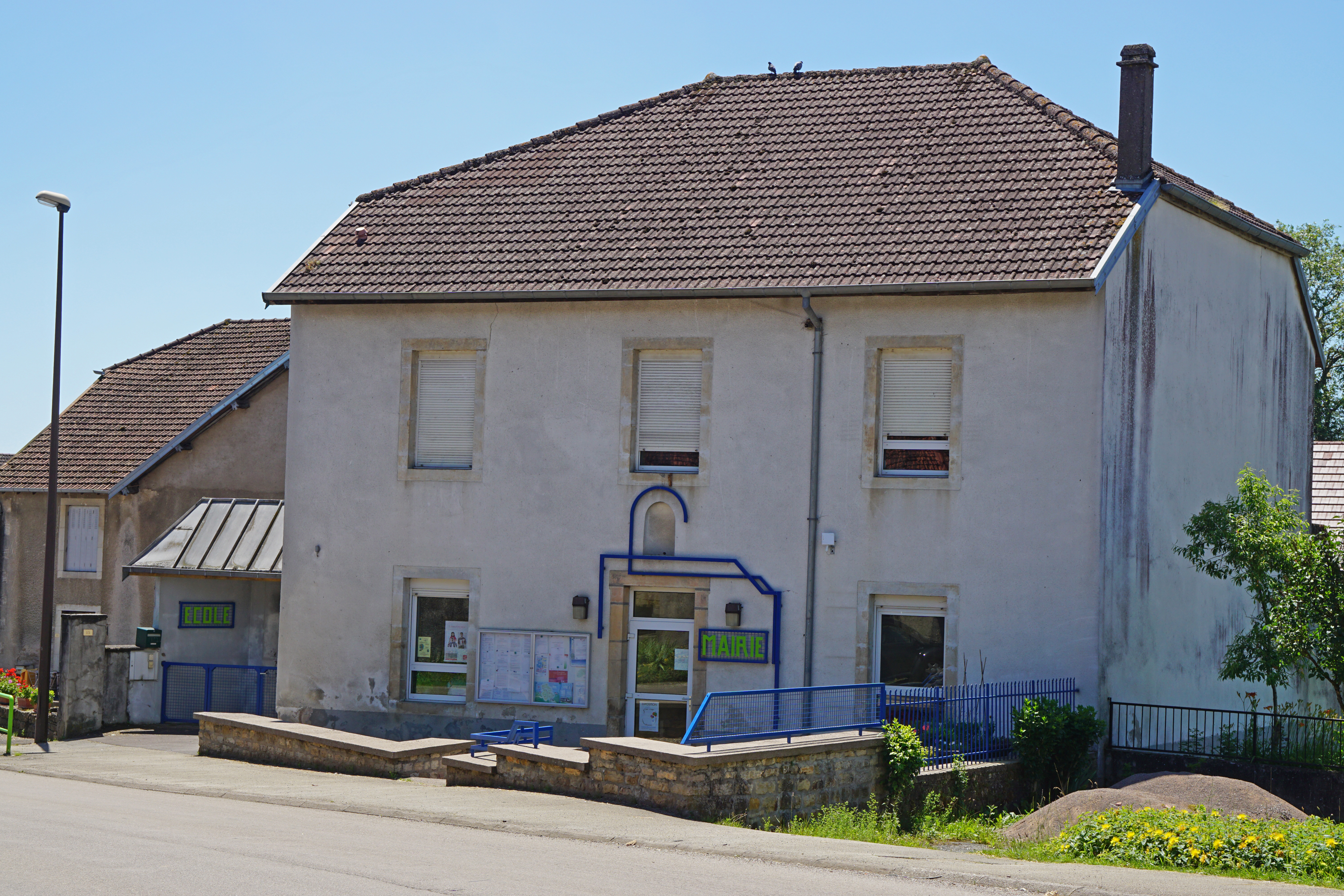
- The town hall in Flagy
- Location of Flagy
- Location within France Location within Bourgogne-Franche-Comté
- Coordinates: 47°41′56″N 6°11′23″E
- Country: France
- Region: Bourgogne-Franche-Comté
- Department: Haute-Saône
- Arrondissement: Vesoul
- Canton: Port-sur-Saône

Government
  - Mayor (2021–2026): Fabien Grandjean
- Area^{1}: 9.70 km^{2} (3.75 sq mi)
- Highest elevation: 338 m (1,109 ft)
- Lowest elevation: 232 m (761 ft)
- Population (2023): 136
  - Density: 14.0/km^{2} (36.3/sq mi)
- Time zone: UTC+01:00 (CET)
  - Summer (DST): UTC+02:00 (CEST)
- INSEE/Postal code: 70235 /70000
- ^{1} French Land Register data, which excludes lakes, ponds, glaciers > 1 km^{2} (0.386 sq mi or 247 acres) and river estuaries.

Flagy (French pronunciation: [flaʒi]) is a commune in the Haute-Saône department in the region of Bourgogne-Franche-Comté in eastern France.

== See also ==
- Communes of the Haute-Saône department
