= Henri Bonnefoy =

French sport shooter (1887–1914)

Personal information
- Born: 17 October 1887 Le Tremblois, France
- Died: 9 August 1914 (aged 26) Cernay, Haut-Rhin, France

Sport
- Sport: Sports shooting
Medal record
Men's shooting
Representing France
Olympic Games
Bronze medal – third place	1908 London	Team small-bore rifle

Henri Bonnefoy (17 October 1887 – 9 August 1914) was a French sport shooter who competed in the 1908 Summer Olympics.

He was born in Le Tremblois and was killed in action in Thann, Haut-Rhin during World War I.

In 1908, he was a member of the French team, which won the bronze medal in the small-bore rifle competition. He also participated in the stationary target small-bore rifle event and finished 19th.

== See also ==
- List of Olympians killed in World War I
