= Igny =

Igny may refer to one of the following communes in France:

- Igny, Essonne, in the Essonne department
- Igny, Haute-Saône, in the Haute-Saône department
- Igny-Comblizy, in the Marne department
- Igny Abbey, in the Marne department
