= Champvans =

Champvans may refer to:

- Champvans, Jura, a commune in the French region of Franche-Comté
- Champvans, Haute-Saône, a commune in the French region of Franche-Comté
- Champvans-les-Moulins, a commune in the department of Doubs
