= Velet =

- Commune
- Location of Velet
- Location within France Location within Bourgogne-Franche-Comté
- Coordinates: 47°25′43″N 5°34′03″E
- Country: France
- Region: Bourgogne-Franche-Comté
- Department: Haute-Saône
- Arrondissement: Vesoul
- Canton: Gray

Government
  - Mayor (2020–2026): Isabelle Schneider
- Area^{1}: 6.05 km^{2} (2.34 sq mi)
- Highest elevation: 241 m (791 ft)
- Lowest elevation: 187 m (614 ft)
- Population (2023): 369
  - Density: 61.0/km^{2} (158/sq mi)
- Time zone: UTC+01:00 (CET)
  - Summer (DST): UTC+02:00 (CEST)
- INSEE/Postal code: 70529 /70100
- ^{1} French Land Register data, which excludes lakes, ponds, glaciers > 1 km^{2} (0.386 sq mi or 247 acres) and river estuaries.

Velet is a commune in the Haute-Saône department in the region of Bourgogne-Franche-Comté in eastern France.

== See also ==
- Communes of the Haute-Saône department
