= Gray-la-Ville =

- Commune
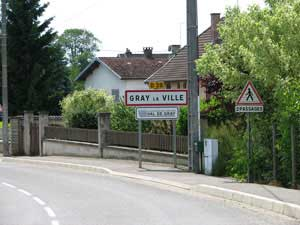
- The road into Gray-la-Ville
- Location of Gray-la-Ville
- Location within France Location within Bourgogne-Franche-Comté
- Coordinates: 47°26′25″N 5°34′23″E
- Country: France
- Region: Bourgogne-Franche-Comté
- Department: Haute-Saône
- Arrondissement: Vesoul
- Canton: Gray

Government
  - Mayor (2020–2026): Yvan Guignot
- Area^{1}: 3.97 km^{2} (1.53 sq mi)
- Highest elevation: 238 m (781 ft)
- Lowest elevation: 187 m (614 ft)
- Population (2023): 928
  - Density: 234/km^{2} (605/sq mi)
- Time zone: UTC+01:00 (CET)
  - Summer (DST): UTC+02:00 (CEST)
- INSEE/Postal code: 70280 /70100
- ^{1} French Land Register data, which excludes lakes, ponds, glaciers > 1 km^{2} (0.386 sq mi or 247 acres) and river estuaries.

Gray-la-Ville (French pronunciation: [ɡʁe la vil]) is a commune in the Haute-Saône department, region of Bourgogne-Franche-Comté, eastern France.

== See also ==
- Communes of the Haute-Saône department
