= Arc-lès-Gray =

- Commune
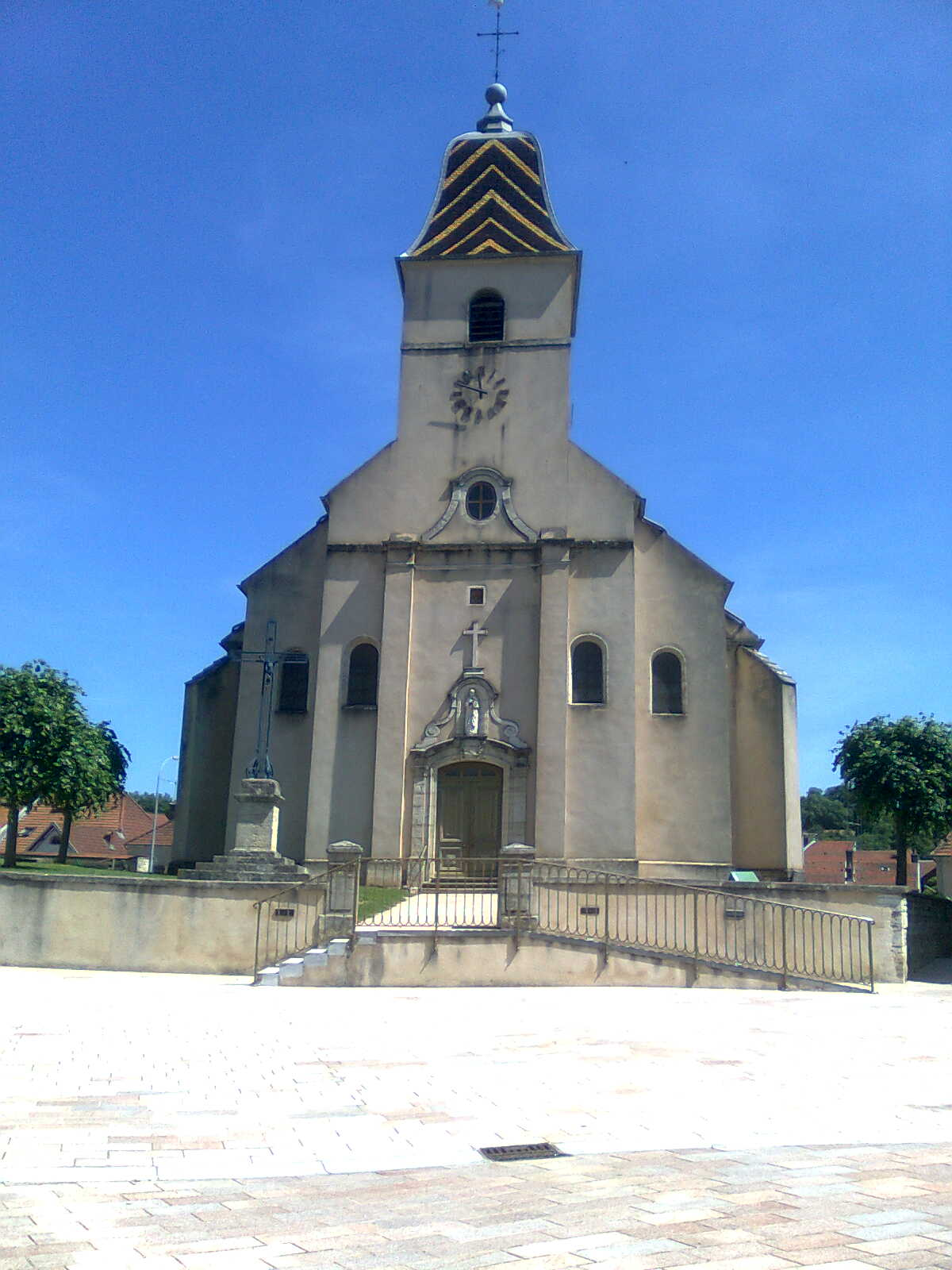
- The church of Arc

- Coat of arms
- Location of Arc-lès-Gray
- Location within France Location within Bourgogne-Franche-Comté
- Coordinates: 47°27′29″N 5°35′07″E
- Country: France
- Region: Bourgogne-Franche-Comté
- Department: Haute-Saône
- Arrondissement: Vesoul
- Canton: Gray

Government
  - Mayor (2024–2026): Virginie Marino
- Area^{1}: 12.10 km^{2} (4.67 sq mi)
- Highest elevation: 246 m (807 ft)
- Lowest elevation: 187 m (614 ft)
- Population (2023): 2,393
  - Density: 197.8/km^{2} (512.2/sq mi)
- Time zone: UTC+01:00 (CET)
  - Summer (DST): UTC+02:00 (CEST)
- INSEE/Postal code: 70026 /70100
- ^{1} French Land Register data, which excludes lakes, ponds, glaciers > 1 km^{2} (0.386 sq mi or 247 acres) and river estuaries.

Arc-lès-Gray (French pronunciation: [aʁk lɛ ɡʁe], lit. 'Arc near Gray', before 1962: Arc) is a commune in the Haute-Saône department in the region of Bourgogne-Franche-Comté in eastern France.

== Population ==
Historical population
Year	Pop.	±% p.a.
1968	3,108	—
1975	3,153	+0.21%
1982	3,220	+0.30%
1990	3,121	−0.39%
1999	2,904	−0.80%
2007	2,650	−1.14%
2012	2,541	−0.84%
2017	2,540	−0.01%
2023	2,393	−0.99%
Source: INSEE

== See also ==
- Communes of the Haute-Saône department
