= Voray-sur-l'Ognon =

- Commune
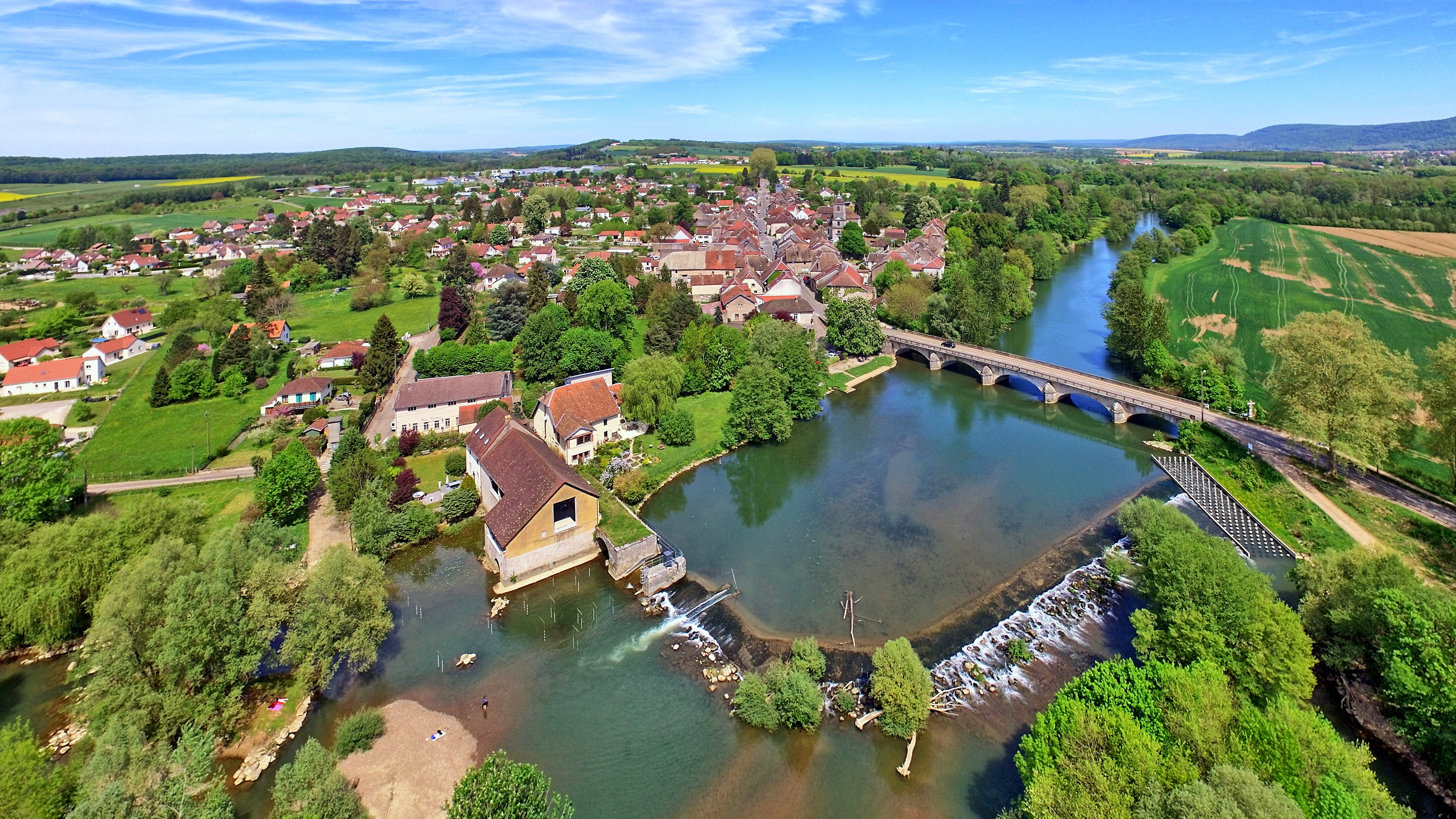
- A general view of Voray-sur-l'Ognon
- Location of Voray-sur-l'Ognon
- Location within France Location within Bourgogne-Franche-Comté
- Coordinates: 47°20′23″N 6°01′08″E
- Country: France
- Region: Bourgogne-Franche-Comté
- Department: Haute-Saône
- Arrondissement: Vesoul
- Canton: Rioz
- Intercommunality: Pays Riolais

Government
  - Mayor (2020–2026): Michel Tournier
- Area^{1}: 6.90 km^{2} (2.66 sq mi)
- Highest elevation: 327 m (1,073 ft)
- Lowest elevation: 210 m (690 ft)
- Population (2023): 854
  - Density: 124/km^{2} (321/sq mi)
- Time zone: UTC+01:00 (CET)
  - Summer (DST): UTC+02:00 (CEST)
- INSEE/Postal code: 70575 /70190
- ^{1} French Land Register data, which excludes lakes, ponds, glaciers > 1 km^{2} (0.386 sq mi or 247 acres) and river estuaries.

Voray-sur-l'Ognon (French pronunciation: [vɔʁɛ syʁ lɔɲɔ̃], literally Voray on the Ognon, before 1962: Voray) is a commune in the Haute-Saône department in the region of Bourgogne-Franche-Comté in eastern France.

== See also ==
- Communes of the Haute-Saône department
