= Mantoche =

- Commune
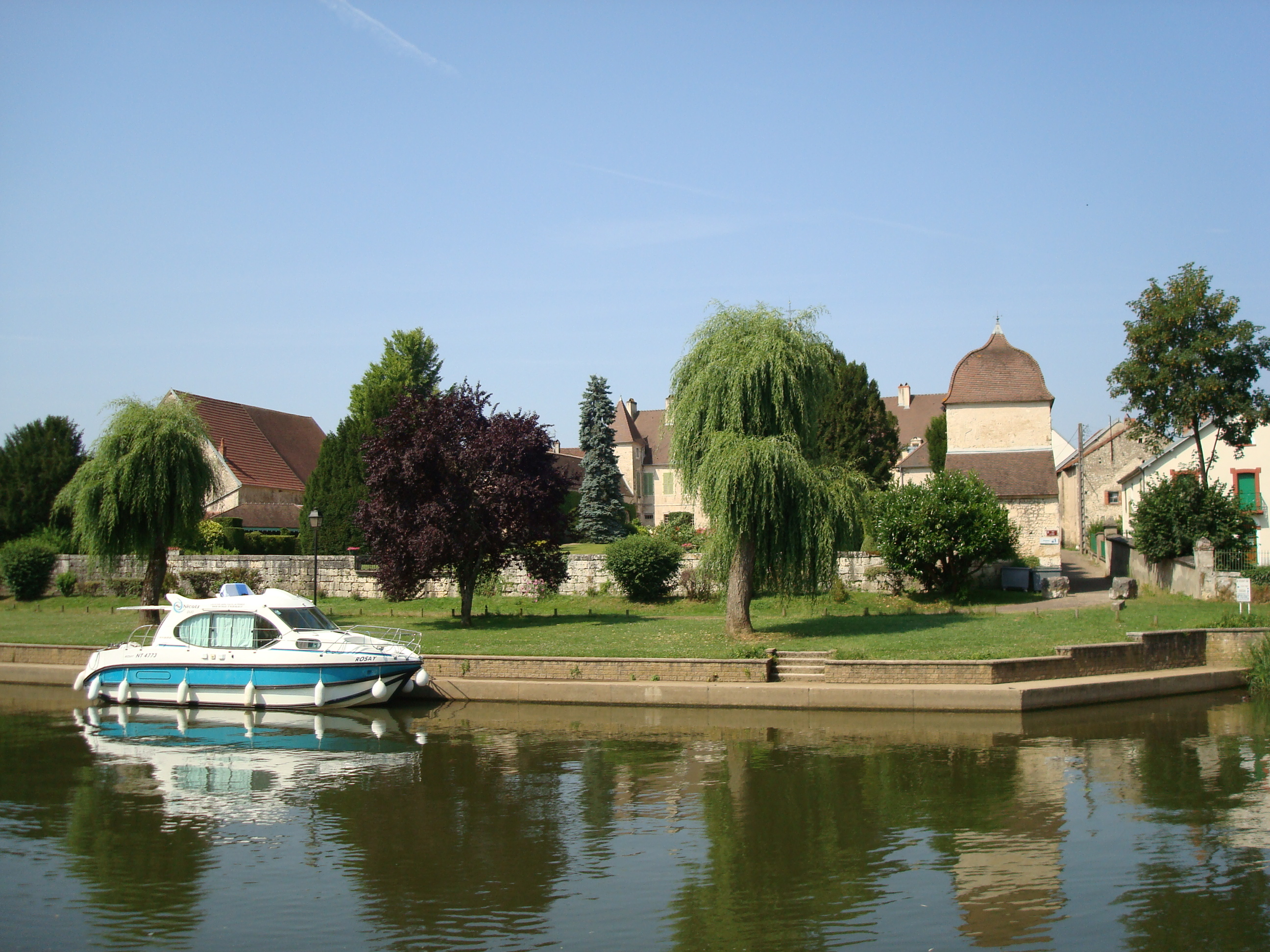
- The moorings in Mantoche

- Coat of arms
- Location of Mantoche
- Location within France Location within Bourgogne-Franche-Comté
- Coordinates: 47°25′12″N 5°31′54″E
- Country: France
- Region: Bourgogne-Franche-Comté
- Department: Haute-Saône
- Arrondissement: Vesoul
- Canton: Gray

Government
  - Mayor (2020–2026): Georges de Gérauvilliers
- Area^{1}: 16.58 km^{2} (6.40 sq mi)
- Highest elevation: 249 m (817 ft)
- Lowest elevation: 187 m (614 ft)
- Population (2023): 458
  - Density: 27.6/km^{2} (71.5/sq mi)
- Time zone: UTC+01:00 (CET)
  - Summer (DST): UTC+02:00 (CEST)
- INSEE/Postal code: 70331 /70100
- ^{1} French Land Register data, which excludes lakes, ponds, glaciers > 1 km^{2} (0.386 sq mi or 247 acres) and river estuaries.

Mantoche (French pronunciation: [mɑ̃tɔʃ]) is a commune in the Haute-Saône department in the region of Bourgogne-Franche-Comté in eastern France.

== See also ==
- Communes of the Haute-Saône department
