= Essertenne-et-Cecey =

- Commune
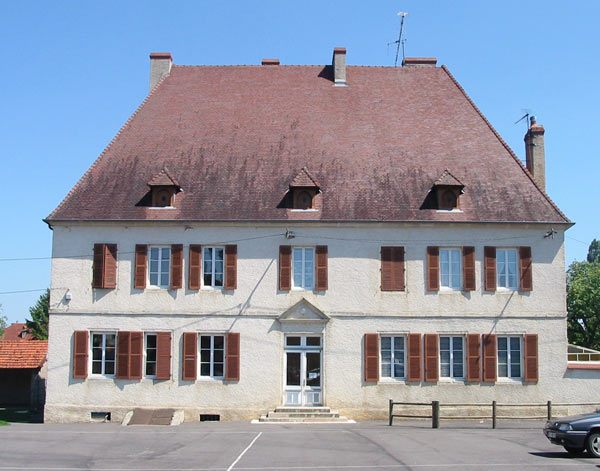
- The school in Essertenne
- Location of Essertenne-et-Cecey
- Location within France Location within Bourgogne-Franche-Comté
- Coordinates: 47°23′56″N 5°28′40″E
- Country: France
- Region: Bourgogne-Franche-Comté
- Department: Haute-Saône
- Arrondissement: Vesoul
- Canton: Gray
- Area^{1}: 11.30 km^{2} (4.36 sq mi)
- Highest elevation: 246 m (807 ft)
- Lowest elevation: 187 m (614 ft)
- Population (2023): 427
  - Density: 37.8/km^{2} (97.9/sq mi)
- Time zone: UTC+01:00 (CET)
  - Summer (DST): UTC+02:00 (CEST)
- INSEE/Postal code: 70220 /70100
- ^{1} French Land Register data, which excludes lakes, ponds, glaciers > 1 km^{2} (0.386 sq mi or 247 acres) and river estuaries.

Essertenne-et-Cecey is a commune in the Haute-Saône department in the region of Bourgogne-Franche-Comté in eastern France.

== See also ==
- Communes of the Haute-Saône department
