= Velesmes-Échevanne =

- Commune
- Coat of arms
- Location of Velesmes-Échevanne
- Location within France Location within Bourgogne-Franche-Comté
- Coordinates: 47°25′13″N 5°42′08″E
- Country: France
- Region: Bourgogne-Franche-Comté
- Department: Haute-Saône
- Arrondissement: Vesoul
- Canton: Gray
- Area^{1}: 22.11 km^{2} (8.54 sq mi)
- Highest elevation: 251 m (823 ft)
- Lowest elevation: 192 m (630 ft)
- Population (2023): 491
  - Density: 22.2/km^{2} (57.5/sq mi)
- Time zone: UTC+01:00 (CET)
  - Summer (DST): UTC+02:00 (CEST)
- INSEE/Postal code: 70528 /70100
- ^{1} French Land Register data, which excludes lakes, ponds, glaciers > 1 km^{2} (0.386 sq mi or 247 acres) and river estuaries.

Velesmes-Échevanne is a commune in the Haute-Saône department in the region of Bourgogne-Franche-Comté in eastern France.

== See also ==
- Communes of the Haute-Saône department
