= Communes of the Haute-Saône department =

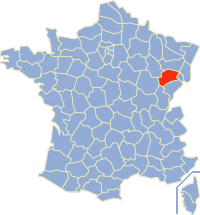

The following is a list of the 536 communes in the French department of Haute-Saône.

The communes cooperate in the following intercommunalities (as of 2025):

- Communauté d'agglomération de Vesoul
- Communauté de communes des Combes
- Communauté de communes de la Haute Comté
- Communauté de communes des Hauts du Val de Saône
- Communauté de communes des mille étangs
- Communauté de communes des Monts de Gy
- Communauté de communes du pays d'Héricourt (partly)
- Communauté de communes du pays de Lure
- Communauté de communes du Pays de Luxeuil
- Communauté de communes du Pays de Montbozon et du Chanois
- Communauté de communes du Pays Riolais
- Communauté de communes du Pays de Villersexel (partly)
- Communauté de communes des Quatre Rivières
- Communauté de communes Rahin et Chérimont
- Communauté de communes des Savoir-Faire (partly)
- Communauté de communes Terres de Saône
- Communauté de communes du Triangle Vert
- Communauté de communes Val de Gray
- Communauté de communes du Val Marnaysien (partly)

INSEE	Postal	Commune
70001	70300	Abelcourt
70002	70500	Aboncourt-Gesincourt
70003	70180	Achey
70004	70200	Adelans-et-le-Val-de-Bithaine
70005	70110	Aillevans
70006	70320	Aillevillers-et-Lyaumont
70007	70300	Ailloncourt
70008	70800	Ainvelle
70009	70500	Aisey-et-Richecourt
70010	70210	Alaincourt
70011	70280	Amage
70012	70160	Amance
70013	70210	Ambiévillers
70014	70200	Amblans-et-Velotte
70015	70170	Amoncourt
70016	70310	Amont-et-Effreney
70017	70210	Anchenoncourt-et-Chazel
70018	70100	Ancier
70019	70000	Andelarre
70020	70000	Andelarrot
70021	70200	Andornay
70022	70700	Angirey
70023	70800	Anjeux
70024	70100	Apremont
70025	70160	Arbecey
70026	70100	Arc-lès-Gray
70027	70600	Argillières
70028	70360	Aroz
70029	70200	Arpenans
70030	70100	Arsans
70031	70110	Athesans-Étroitefontaine
70032	70100	Attricourt
70035	70500	Augicourt
70036	70190	Aulx-lès-Cromary
70037	70180	Autet
70038	70190	Authoison
70039	70700	Autoreille
70040	70110	Autrey-lès-Cerre
70041	70100	Autrey-lès-Gray
70042	70110	Autrey-le-Vay
70043	70100	Auvet-et-la-Chapelotte
70044	70000	Auxon
70045	70150	Avrigney-Virey
70046	70200	Les Aynans
70047	70000	Baignes
70048	70140	Bard-lès-Pesmes
70049	70500	Barges
70050	70190	La Barre
70051	70210	La Basse-Vaivre
70052	70800	Bassigney
70053	70130	Les Bâties
70054	70100	Battrans
70055	70300	Baudoncourt
70056	70160	Baulay
70057	70150	Bay
70058	70100	Beaujeu-Saint-Vallier-Pierrejux-et-Quitteur
70059	70190	Beaumotte-Aubertans
70060	70150	Beaumotte-lès-Pin
70061	70290	Belfahy
70180	70110	Belles-Fontaines
70062	70270	Belmont
70063	70270	Belonchamp
70064	70400	Belverne
70065	70230	Besnans
70066	70500	Betaucourt
70067	70300	Betoncourt-lès-Brotte
70069	70210	Betoncourt-Saint-Pancras
70070	70500	Betoncourt-sur-Mance
70071	70310	Beulotte-Saint-Laurent
70072	70110	Beveuge
70074	70500	Blondefontaine
70075	70150	Bonboillon
70076	70700	Bonnevent-Velloreille
70077	70110	Borey
70078	70500	Bougey
70079	70170	Bougnon
70080	70100	Bouhans-et-Feurg
70081	70200	Bouhans-lès-Lure
70082	70230	Bouhans-lès-Montbozon
70083	70800	Bouligney
70084	70190	Boulot
70085	70190	Boult
70086	70500	Bourbévelle
70087	70800	Bourguignon-lès-Conflans
70088	70190	Bourguignon-lès-la-Charité
70089	70120	Bourguignon-lès-Morey
70090	70000	Boursières
70091	70500	Bousseraucourt
70092	70140	Bresilley
70093	70300	Breuches
70094	70280	Breuchotte
70095	70160	Breurey-lès-Faverney
70096	70400	Brevilliers
70097	70800	Briaucourt
70098	70300	Brotte-lès-Luxeuil
70099	70180	Brotte-lès-Ray
70101	70140	Broye-Aubigney-Montseugny
70100	70100	Broye-les-Loups-et-Verfontaine
70102	70150	Brussey
70103	70280	La Bruyère
70104	70700	Bucey-lès-Gy
70105	70360	Bucey-lès-Traves
70106	70500	Buffignécourt
70107	70190	Bussières
70109	70190	Buthiers
70111	70240	Calmoutier
70112	70500	Cemboing
70113	70230	Cenans
70114	70500	Cendrecourt
70115	70000	Cerre-lès-Noroy
70116	70400	Chagey
70117	70400	Châlonvillars
70118	70190	Chambornay-lès-Bellevaux
70119	70150	Chambornay-lès-Pin
70120	70290	Champagney
70121	70400	Champey
70122	70600	Champlitte
70124	70100	Champtonnay
70125	70100	Champvans
70126	70140	Chancey
70127	70360	Chantes
70128	70300	La Chapelle-lès-Luxeuil
70129	70700	La Chapelle-Saint-Quillain
70130	70700	Charcenne
70132	70100	Chargey-lès-Gray
70133	70170	Chargey-lès-Port
70134	70000	Chariez
70135	70120	Charmes-Saint-Valbert
70136	70000	Charmoille
70137	70230	Chassey-lès-Montbozon
70138	70360	Chassey-lès-Scey
70140	70240	Châteney
70141	70240	Châtenois
70142	70140	Chaumercenne
70143	70500	Chauvirey-le-Châtel
70144	70500	Chauvirey-le-Vieil
70145	70190	Chaux-la-Lotière
70146	70170	Chaux-lès-Port
70147	70400	Chavanne
70148	70360	Chemilly
70149	70400	Chenebier
70150	70150	Chenevrey-et-Morogne
70151	70140	Chevigney
70153	70120	Cintrey
70154	70190	Cirey
70155	70300	Citers
70156	70700	Citey
70157	70200	Clairegoutte
70158	70000	Clans
70159	70230	Cognières
70160	70400	Coisevaux
70162	70000	Colombe-lès-Vesoul
70163	70000	Colombier
70152	70700	Colombine
70164	70240	Colombotte
70165	70120	Combeaufontaine
70166	70000	Comberjon
70167	70170	Conflandey
70168	70800	Conflans-sur-Lanterne
70169	70120	Confracourt
70170	70160	Contréglise
70171	70320	Corbenay
70172	70300	La Corbière
70174	70190	Cordonnet
70175	70120	Cornot
70176	70310	Corravillers
70177	70500	Corre
70178	70200	La Côte
70179	70000	Coulevon
70181	70150	Courcuire
70182	70400	Courmont
70183	70600	Courtesoult-et-Gatey
70184	70400	Couthenans
70185	70100	Cresancey
70186	70240	La Creuse
70187	70400	Crevans-et-la-Chapelle-lès-Granges
70188	70240	Creveney
70189	70190	Cromary
70190	70160	Cubry-lès-Faverney
70192	70700	Cugney
70193	70150	Cult
70194	70800	Cuve
70195	70200	Dambenoît-lès-Colombe
70196	70800	Dampierre-lès-Conflans
70197	70230	Dampierre-sur-Linotte
70198	70180	Dampierre-sur-Salon
70199	70000	Dampvalley-lès-Colombe
70200	70210	Dampvalley-Saint-Pancras
70201	70180	Delain
70202	70210	Demangevelle
70203	70000	La Demie
70204	70180	Denèvre
70205	70400	Échavanne
70206	70400	Échenans-sous-Mont-Vaudois
70207	70000	Échenoz-la-Méline
70208	70000	Échenoz-le-Sec
70210	70270	Écromagny
70211	70600	Écuelle
70213	70300	Éhuns
70214	70160	Équevilley
70215	70400	Errevet
70216	70300	Esboz-Brest
70217	70310	Esmoulières
70218	70100	Esmoulins
70219	70110	Esprels
70220	70100	Essertenne-et-Cecey
70221	70400	Étobon
70222	70700	Étrelles-et-la-Montbleuse
70224	70150	Étuz
70225	70100	Fahy-lès-Autrey
70226	70110	Fallon
70227	70310	Faucogney-et-la-Mer
70228	70160	Faverney
70229	70200	Faymont
70230	70120	Fédry
70231	70130	Ferrières-lès-Ray
70232	70360	Ferrières-lès-Scey
70233	70310	Les Fessey
70234	70230	Filain
70235	70000	Flagy
70236	70160	Fleurey-lès-Faverney
70237	70120	Fleurey-lès-Lavoncourt
70238	70800	Fleurey-lès-Saint-Loup
70239	70190	Fondremand
70240	70800	Fontaine-lès-Luxeuil
70242	70210	Fontenois-la-Ville
70243	70230	Fontenois-lès-Montbozon
70244	70160	Fouchécourt
70245	70220	Fougerolles-Saint-Valbert
70247	70600	Fouvent-Saint-Andoche
70248	70400	Frahier-et-Chatebier
70252	70600	Framont
70249	70800	Francalmont
70250	70200	Franchevelle
70251	70180	Francourt
70253	70700	Frasne-le-Château
70254	70200	Frédéric-Fontaine
70255	70130	Fresne-Saint-Mamès
70256	70270	Fresse
70257	70130	Fretigney-et-Velloreille
70258	70300	Froideconche
70259	70200	Froideterre
70260	70200	Frotey-lès-Lure
70261	70000	Frotey-lès-Vesoul
70262	70240	Genevreuille
70263	70240	Genevrey
70265	70100	Germigney
70267	70500	Gevigney-et-Mercey
70268	70700	Gézier-et-Fontenelay
70269	70210	Girefontaine
70271	70110	Gouhenans
70272	70120	Gourgeon
70273	70110	Grammont
70274	70120	Grandecourt
70443	70140	La Grande-Résie
70275	70190	Grandvelle-et-le-Perrenot
70276	70400	Granges-la-Ville
70277	70400	Granges-le-Bourg
70278	70170	Grattery
70279	70100	Gray
70280	70100	Gray-la-Ville
70282	70700	Gy
70283	70440	Haut-du-Them-Château-Lambert
70284	70800	Hautevelle
70285	70400	Héricourt
70286	70150	Hugier
70287	70210	Hurecourt
70288	70190	Hyet
70289	70700	Igny
70290	70800	Jasney
70291	70500	Jonvelle

INSEE	Postal	Commune
70292	70500	Jussey
70293	70500	Lambrey
70294	70200	Lantenot
70295	70270	La Lanterne-et-les-Armonts
70296	70230	Larians-et-Munans
70297	70600	Larret
70298	70120	Lavigney
70299	70120	Lavoncourt
70301	70190	Lieffrans
70302	70140	Lieucourt
70303	70240	Liévans
70304	70200	Linexert
70305	70100	Lœuilley
70306	70200	Lomont
70307	70110	Longevelle
70308	70310	La Longine
70309	70230	Loulans-Verchamp
70310	70200	Lure
70311	70300	Luxeuil-les-Bains
70312	70400	Luze
70313	70200	Lyoffans
70314	70300	Magnivray
70315	70800	Magnoncourt
70316	70000	Le Magnoray
70317	70110	Les Magny
70318	70200	Magny-Danigon
70319	70200	Magny-Jobert
70320	70500	Magny-lès-Jussey
70321	70200	Magny-Vernois
70322	70240	Mailleroncourt-Charette
70323	70210	Mailleroncourt-Saint-Pancras
70324	70000	Mailley-et-Chazelot
70325	70190	Maizières
70326	70190	La Malachère
70327	70140	Malans
70328	70200	Malbouhans
70329	70120	Malvillers
70330	70400	Mandrevillars
70331	70100	Mantoche
70332	70110	Marast
70334	70150	Marnay
70335	70230	Maussans
70336	70110	Mélecey
70337	70120	Melin
70338	70210	Melincourt
70339	70270	Mélisey
70340	70180	Membrey
70341	70160	Menoux
70342	70130	Mercey-sur-Saône
70343	70160	Mersuay
70344	70300	Meurcourt
70347	70400	Mignavillers
70348	70200	Moffans-et-Vacheresse
70349	70110	Moimay
70350	70120	Molay
70351	70240	Mollans
70352	70310	La Montagne
70353	70140	Montagney
70355	70190	Montarlot-lès-Rioz
70356	70700	Montboillon
70357	70230	Montbozon
70358	70000	Montcey
70359	70500	Montcourt
70360	70210	Montdoré
70361	70270	Montessaux
70362	70500	Montigny-lès-Cherlieu
70363	70000	Montigny-lès-Vesoul
70364	70110	Montjustin-et-Velotte
70367	70000	Mont-le-Vernois
70368	70180	Montot
70369	70120	Mont-Saint-Léger
70371	70100	Montureux-et-Prantigny
70372	70500	Montureux-lès-Baulay
70374	70140	Motey-Besuche
70376	70100	Nantilly
70378	70000	Navenne
70380	70160	Neurey-en-Vaux
70381	70000	Neurey-lès-la-Demie
70383	70190	Neuvelle-lès-Cromary
70384	70130	Neuvelle-lès-la-Charité
70385	70200	La Neuvelle-lès-Lure
70386	70360	La Neuvelle-lès-Scey
70387	70130	Noidans-le-Ferroux
70388	70000	Noidans-lès-Vesoul
70389	70100	Noiron
70390	70000	Noroy-le-Bourg
70392	70120	Oigney
70393	70700	Oiselay-et-Grachaux
70394	70100	Onay
70395	70110	Oppenans
70396	70110	Oricourt
70397	70230	Ormenans
70398	70300	Ormoiche
70399	70500	Ormoy
70400	70500	Ouge
70401	70360	Ovanches
70402	70600	Oyrières
70403	70200	Palante
70404	70210	Passavant-la-Rochère
70405	70190	Pennesières
70406	70600	Percey-le-Grand
70407	70190	Perrouse
70408	70140	Pesmes
70409	70600	Pierrecourt
70410	70150	Pin
70411	70800	La Pisseure
70412	70800	Plainemont
70413	70290	Plancher-Bas
70414	70290	Plancher-les-Mines
70415	70210	Polaincourt-et-Clairefontaine
70416	70240	Pomoy
70417	70360	Pontcey
70419	70210	Pont-du-Bois
70420	70110	Pont-sur-l'Ognon
70421	70170	Port-sur-Saône
70422	70100	Poyans
70423	70120	Preigney
70425	70310	La Proiselière-et-Langle
70426	70170	Provenchère
70427	70160	Purgerot
70428	70000	Pusey
70429	70000	Pusy-et-Épenoux
70430	70120	La Quarte
70431	70190	Quenoche
70432	70200	Quers
70433	70000	Quincey
70435	70280	Raddon-et-Chapendu
70436	70500	Raincourt
70437	70500	Ranzevelle
70438	70130	Ray-sur-Saône
70439	70000	Raze
70440	70130	Recologne
70441	70190	Recologne-lès-Rioz
70442	70120	Renaucourt
70444	70140	La Résie-Saint-Martin
70445	70200	Rignovelle
70446	70100	Rigny
70447	70190	Rioz
70448	70180	Roche-et-Raucourt
70450	70120	La Rochelle
70373	70120	La Roche-Morey
70449	70230	Roche-sur-Linotte-et-Sorans-les-Cordiers
70418	70130	La Romaine
70451	70250	Ronchamp
70452	70000	Rosey
70453	70310	La Rosière
70454	70500	Rosières-sur-Mance
70455	70200	Roye
70456	70190	Ruhans
70457	70360	Rupt-sur-Saône
70459	70270	Saint-Barthélemy
70460	70280	Saint-Bresson
70461	70100	Saint-Broing
70469	70310	Sainte-Marie-en-Chanois
70470	70300	Sainte-Marie-en-Chaux
70471	70700	Sainte-Reine
70462	70110	Saint-Ferjeux
70463	70130	Saint-Gand
70464	70200	Saint-Germain
70466	70100	Saint-Loup-Nantouard
70467	70800	Saint-Loup-sur-Semouse
70468	70500	Saint-Marcel
70472	70160	Saint-Rémy-en-Comté
70473	70300	Saint-Sauveur
70474	70110	Saint-Sulpice
70476	70210	Saponcourt
70477	70400	Saulnot
70478	70240	Saulx
70479	70100	Sauvigney-lès-Gray
70480	70140	Sauvigney-lès-Pesmes
70481	70130	Savoyeux
70482	70360	Scey-sur-Saône-et-Saint-Albin
70483	70170	Scye
70484	70400	Secenans
70485	70210	Selles
70486	70120	Semmadon
70487	70110	Senargent-Mignafans
70488	70160	Senoncourt
70489	70440	Servance-Miellin
70490	70240	Servigney
70491	70130	Seveux-Motey
70492	70130	Soing-Cubry-Charentenay
70493	70190	Sorans-lès-Breurey
70494	70150	Sornay
70496	70500	Tartécourt
70498	70270	Ternuay-Melay-et-Saint-Hilaire
70499	70120	Theuley
70500	70230	Thieffrans
70501	70230	Thiénans
70502	70120	Tincey-et-Pontrebeau
70503	70190	Traitiéfontaine
70504	70360	Traves
70505	70100	Le Tremblois
70506	70400	Trémoins
70507	70190	Trésilley
70509	70150	Tromarey
70510	70140	Vadans
70511	70180	Vaite
70512	70320	La Vaivre
70513	70000	Vaivre-et-Montoille
70514	70140	Valay
70515	70200	Le Val-de-Gouhenans
70516	70000	Vallerois-le-Bois
70517	70000	Vallerois-Lorioz
70518	70160	Le Val-Saint-Éloi
70519	70190	Vandelans
70520	70130	Vanne
70521	70700	Vantoux-et-Longevelle
70522	70240	Varogne
70523	70600	Vars
70524	70170	Vauchoux
70525	70120	Vauconcourt-Nervezain
70526	70210	Vauvillers
70527	70700	Vaux-le-Moncelot
70528	70100	Velesmes-Échevanne
70529	70100	Velet
70531	70700	Velleclaire
70532	70000	Vellefaux
70533	70700	Vellefrey-et-Vellefrange
70534	70240	Vellefrie
70535	70000	Velleguindry-et-Levrecey
70536	70000	Velle-le-Châtel
70537	70240	Velleminfroy
70538	70700	Vellemoz
70539	70130	Vellexon-Queutrey-et-Vaudey
70540	70700	Velloreille-lès-Choye
70541	70300	Velorcey
70542	70100	Venère
70545	70500	Venisey
70546	70180	Vereux
70544	70200	La Vergenne
70547	70400	Verlans
70548	70500	Vernois-sur-Mance
70549	70130	La Vernotte
70550	70000	Vesoul
70552	70110	Villafans
70553	70110	Villargent
70554	70500	Villars-le-Pautel
70555	70160	La Villedieu-en-Fontenette
70558	70240	La Villeneuve-Bellenoye-et-la-Maize
70559	70000	Villeparois
70560	70190	Villers-Bouton
70366	70700	Villers-Chemin-et-Mont-lès-Étrelles
70561	70110	Villersexel
70562	70110	Villers-la-Ville
70563	70000	Villers-le-Sec
70564	70300	Villers-lès-Luxeuil
70565	70190	Villers-Pater
70566	70170	Villers-sur-Port
70567	70400	Villers-sur-Saulnot
70568	70120	Villers-Vaudey
70569	70240	Vilory
70571	70300	Visoncourt
70572	70500	Vitrey-sur-Mance
70573	70310	La Voivre
70574	70180	Volon
70575	70190	Voray-sur-l'Ognon
70576	70500	Vougécourt
70577	70200	Vouhenans
70578	70150	Vregille
70579	70400	Vyans-le-Val
70580	70130	Vy-le-Ferroux
70583	70230	Vy-lès-Filain
70581	70200	Vy-lès-Lure
70582	70120	Vy-lès-Rupt
