= Villers-Pater =

- Commune
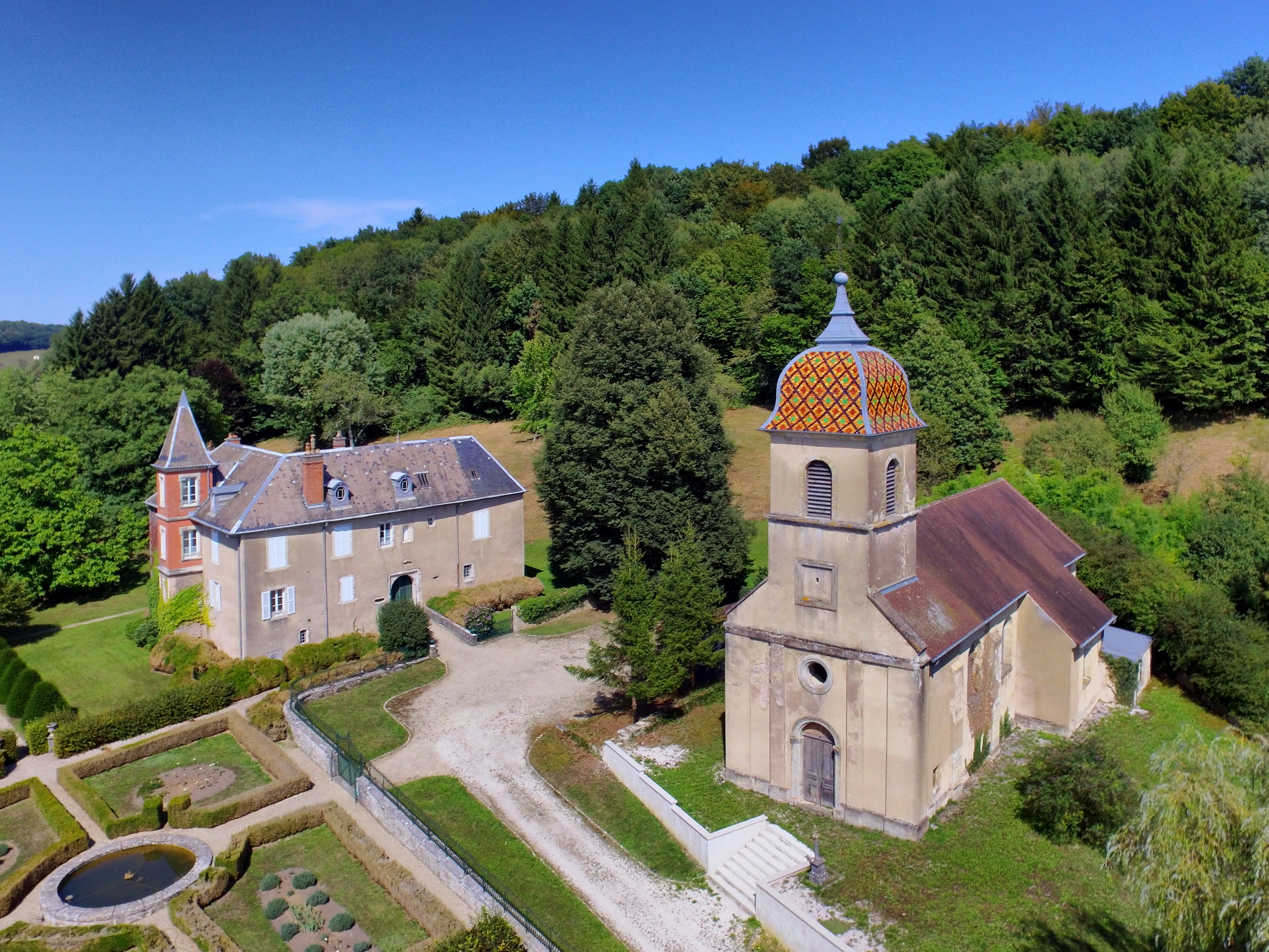
- The church and chateau in Villers-Pater
- Location of Villers-Pater
- Location within France Location within Bourgogne-Franche-Comté
- Coordinates: 47°28′04″N 6°09′45″E
- Country: France
- Region: Bourgogne-Franche-Comté
- Department: Haute-Saône
- Arrondissement: Vesoul
- Canton: Rioz

Government
  - Mayor (2023–2026): Marie-Claude Mougin
- Area^{1}: 4.67 km^{2} (1.80 sq mi)
- Highest elevation: 372 m (1,220 ft)
- Lowest elevation: 247 m (810 ft)
- Population (2023): 46
  - Density: 9.9/km^{2} (26/sq mi)
- Time zone: UTC+01:00 (CET)
  - Summer (DST): UTC+02:00 (CEST)
- INSEE/Postal code: 70565 /70190
- ^{1} French Land Register data, which excludes lakes, ponds, glaciers > 1 km^{2} (0.386 sq mi or 247 acres) and river estuaries.

Villers-Pater is a commune in the Haute-Saône department in the region of Bourgogne-Franche-Comté in eastern France.

== See also ==
- Communes of the Haute-Saône department
