= Germigney, Haute-Saône =

Germigney
- Commune
- Coat of arms
- Location of Germigney
- Location within France Location within Bourgogne-Franche-Comté
- Coordinates: 47°22′39″N 5°32′59″E
- Country: France
- Region: Bourgogne-Franche-Comté
- Department: Haute-Saône
- Arrondissement: Vesoul
- Canton: Gray

Government
  - Mayor (2020–2026): Pascal Parot
- Area^{1}: 15.10 km^{2} (5.83 sq mi)
- Highest elevation: 247 m (810 ft)
- Lowest elevation: 188 m (617 ft)
- Population (2023): 145
  - Density: 9.60/km^{2} (24.9/sq mi)
- Time zone: UTC+01:00 (CET)
  - Summer (DST): UTC+02:00 (CEST)
- INSEE/Postal code: 70265 /70100
- ^{1} French Land Register data, which excludes lakes, ponds, glaciers > 1 km^{2} (0.386 sq mi or 247 acres) and river estuaries.

Germigney (French pronunciation: [ʒɛʁmiɲɛ]) is a commune in the Haute-Saône department in the region of Bourgogne-Franche-Comté in eastern France.

== See also ==
- Communes of the Haute-Saône department
