= Saint-Loup-Nantouard =

- Commune
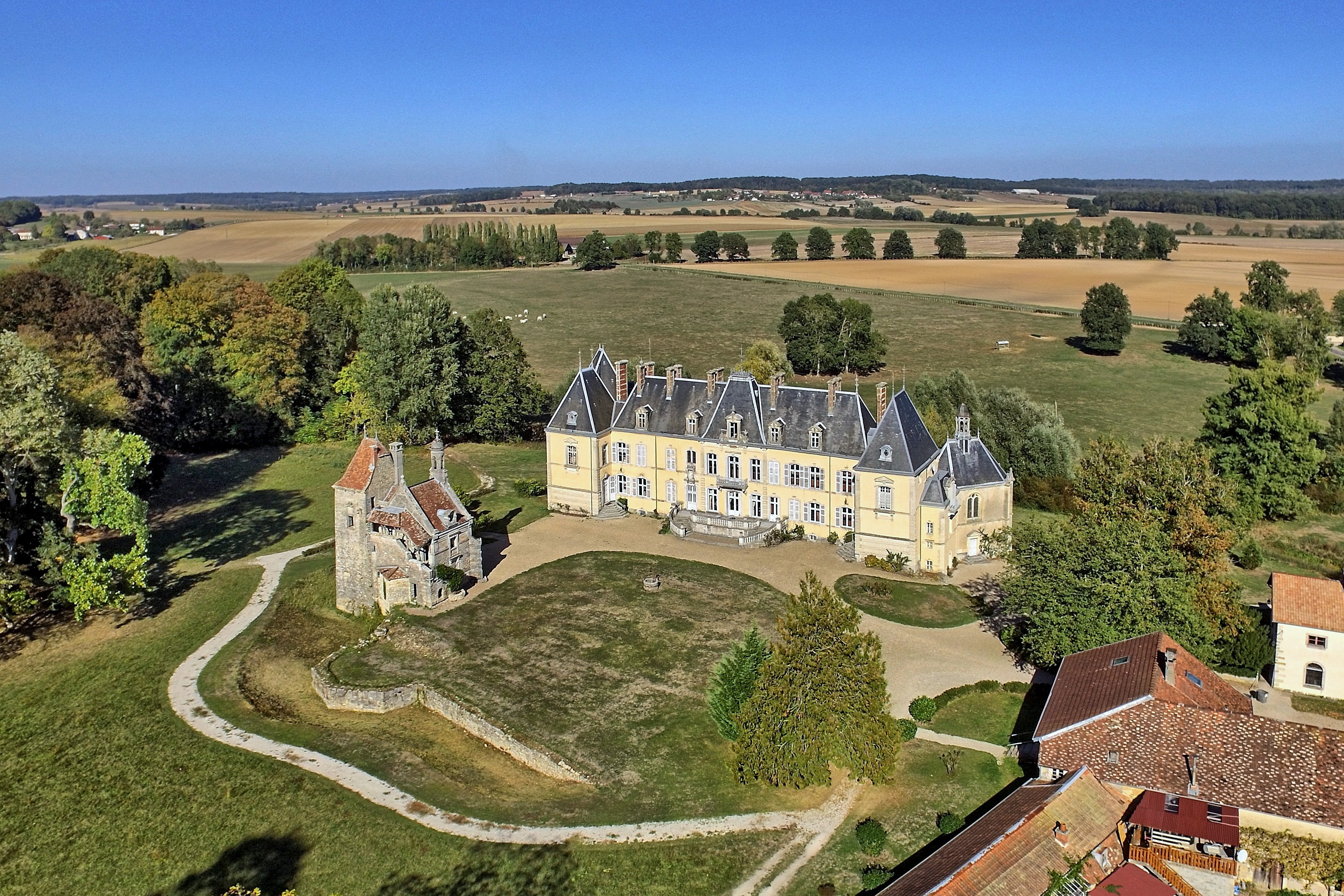
- The chateau in Saint-Loup-Nantouard
- Location of Saint-Loup-Nantouard
- Location within France Location within Bourgogne-Franche-Comté
- Coordinates: 47°25′34″N 5°43′33″E
- Country: France
- Region: Bourgogne-Franche-Comté
- Department: Haute-Saône
- Arrondissement: Vesoul
- Canton: Gray

Government
  - Mayor (2020–2026): Monique Ousset
- Area^{1}: 7.64 km^{2} (2.95 sq mi)
- Highest elevation: 243 m (797 ft)
- Lowest elevation: 192 m (630 ft)
- Population (2023): 119
  - Density: 15.6/km^{2} (40.3/sq mi)
- Time zone: UTC+01:00 (CET)
  - Summer (DST): UTC+02:00 (CEST)
- INSEE/Postal code: 70466 /70100
- ^{1} French Land Register data, which excludes lakes, ponds, glaciers > 1 km^{2} (0.386 sq mi or 247 acres) and river estuaries.

Saint-Loup-Nantouard (French pronunciation: [sɛ̃ lu nɑ̃twaʁ]) is a commune in the Haute-Saône department in the region of Bourgogne-Franche-Comté in eastern France.

== See also ==
- Communes of the Haute-Saône department
