= Champtonnay =

- Commune
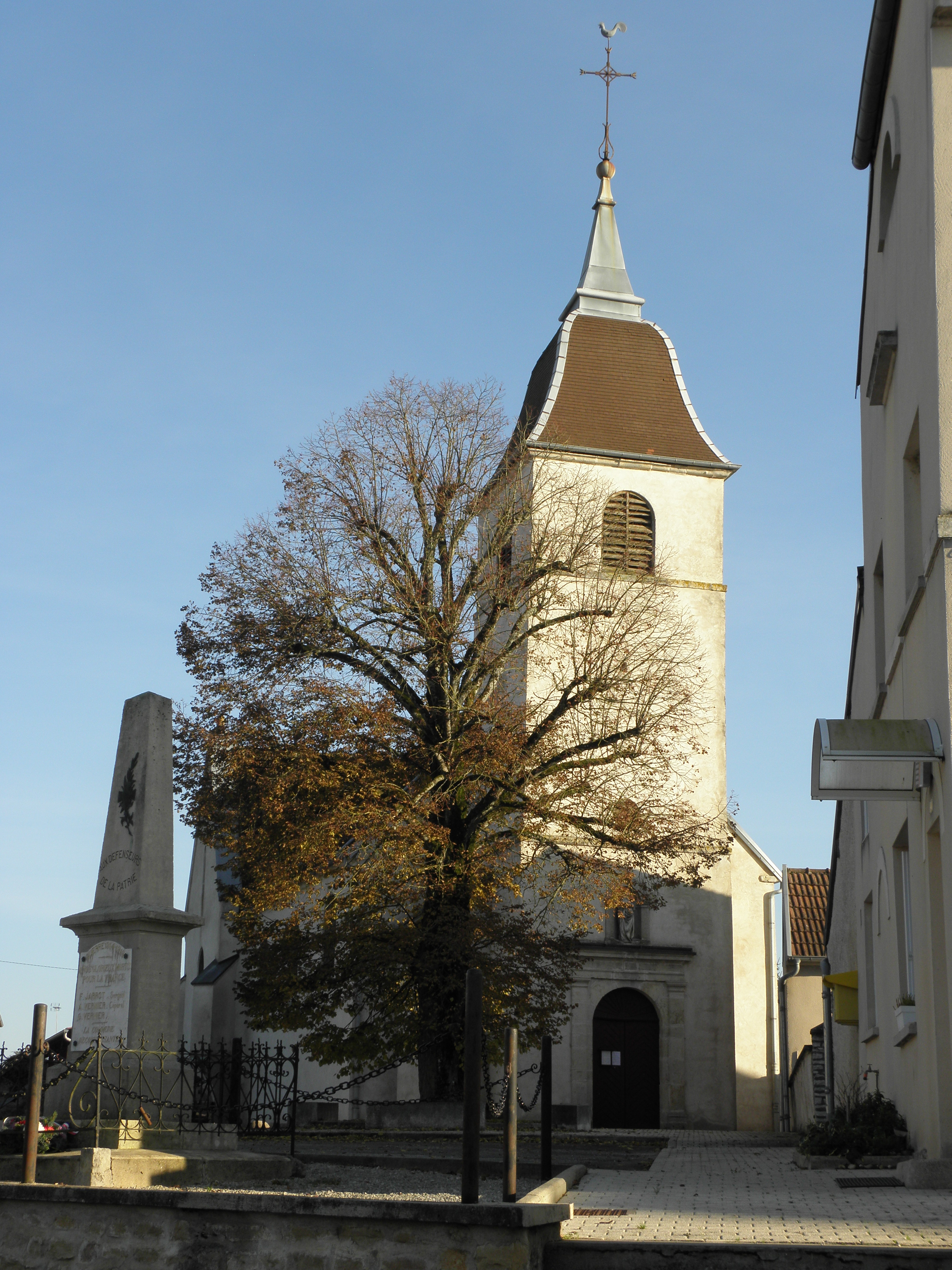
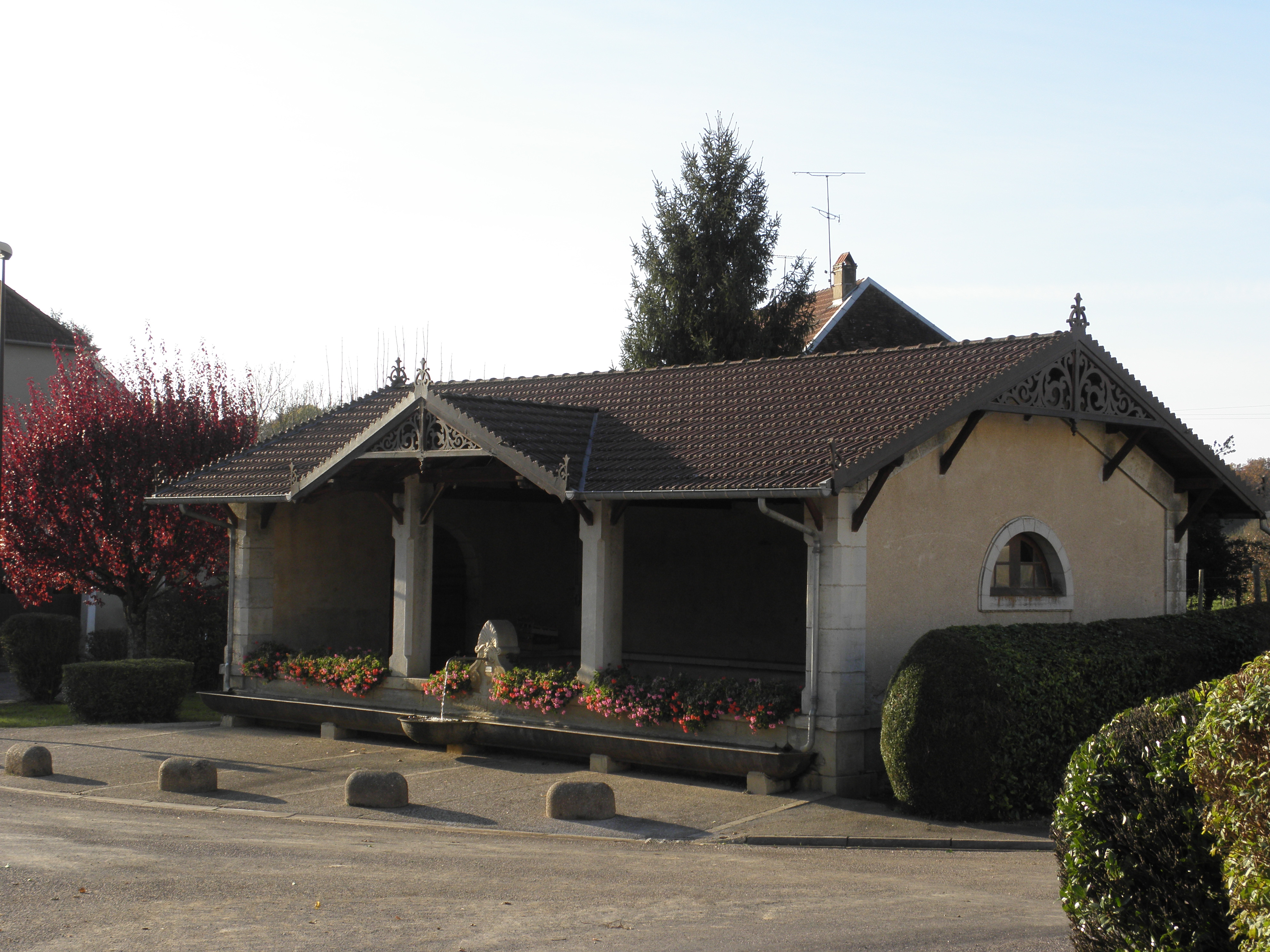
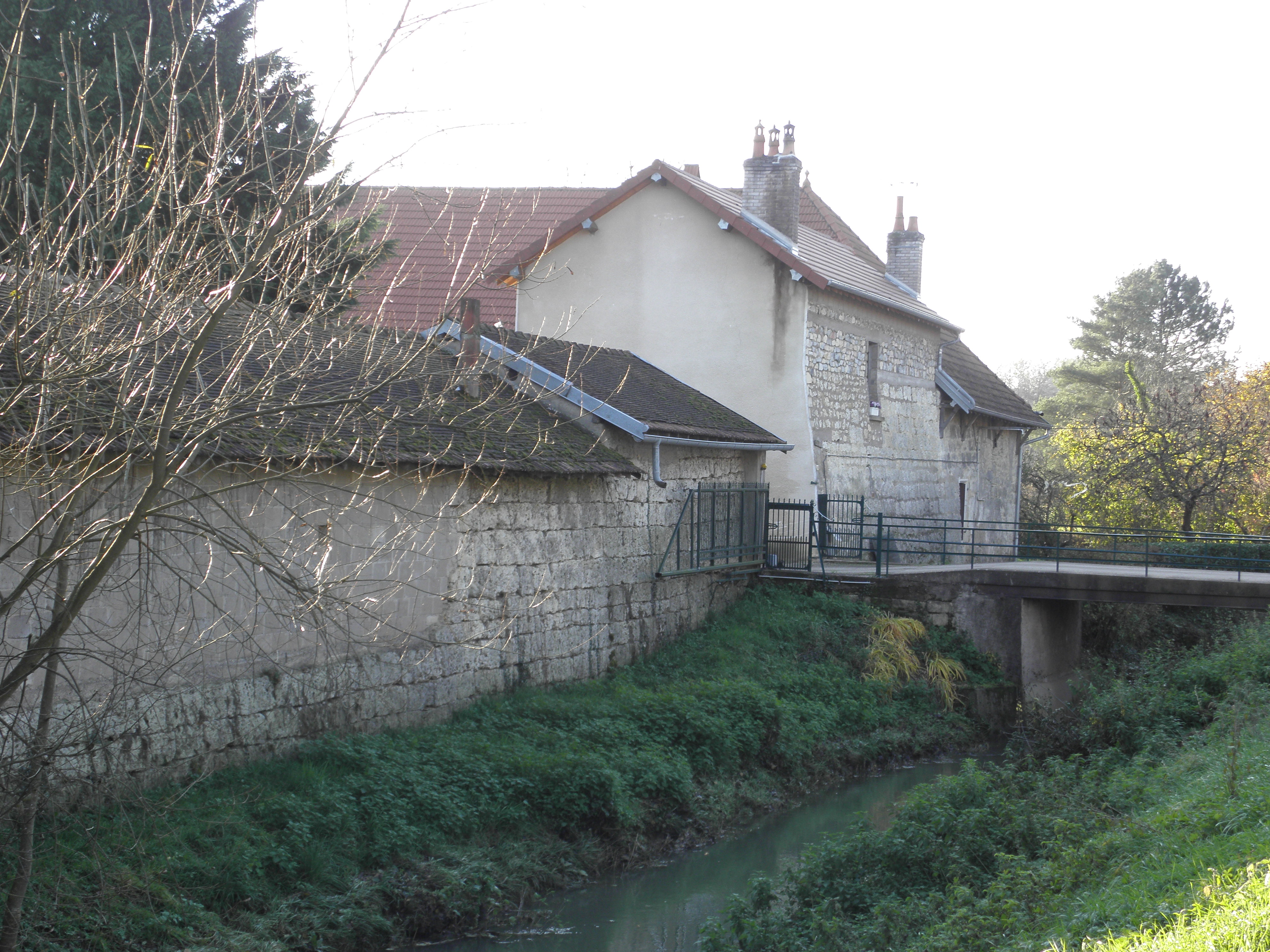
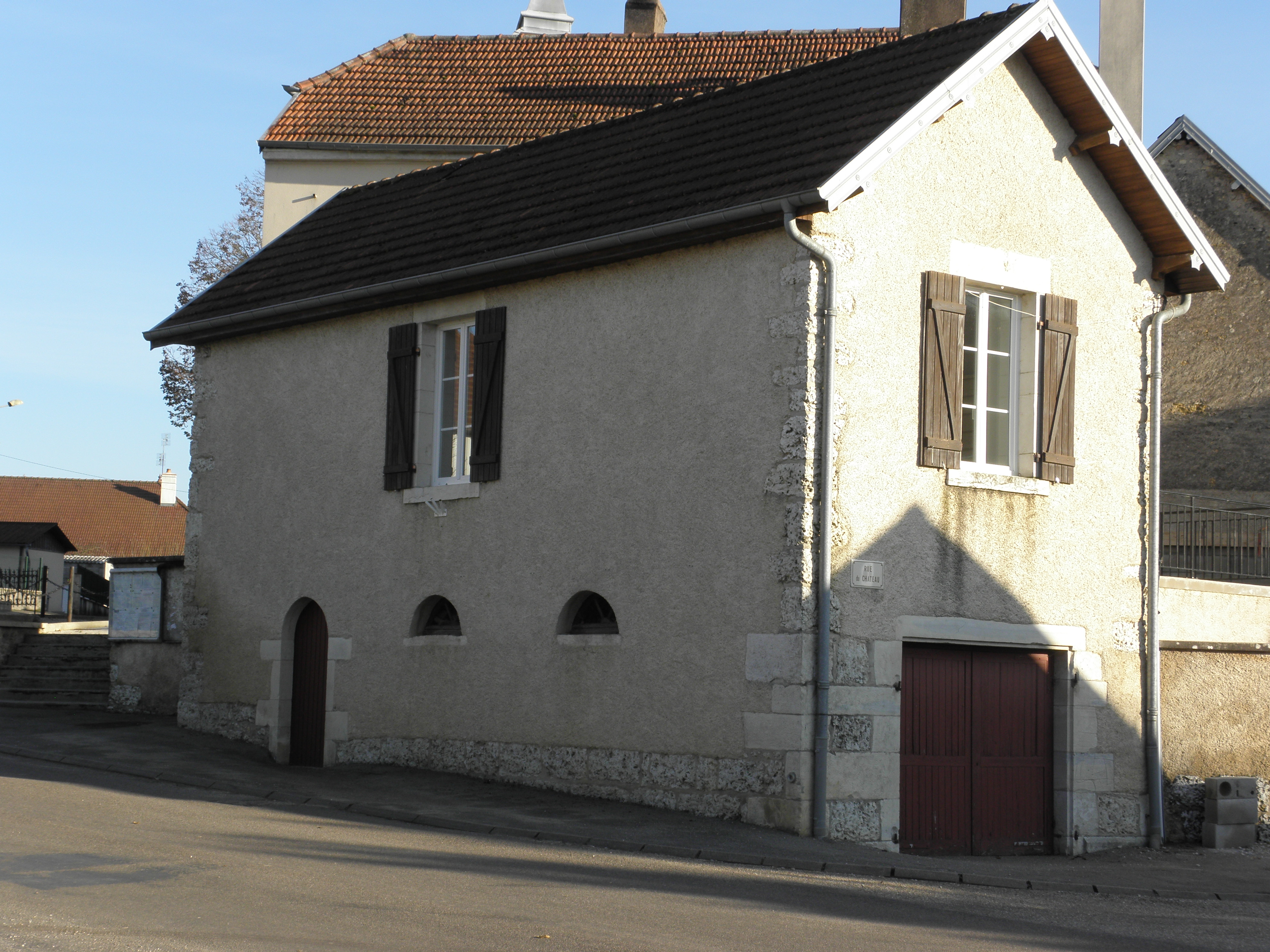
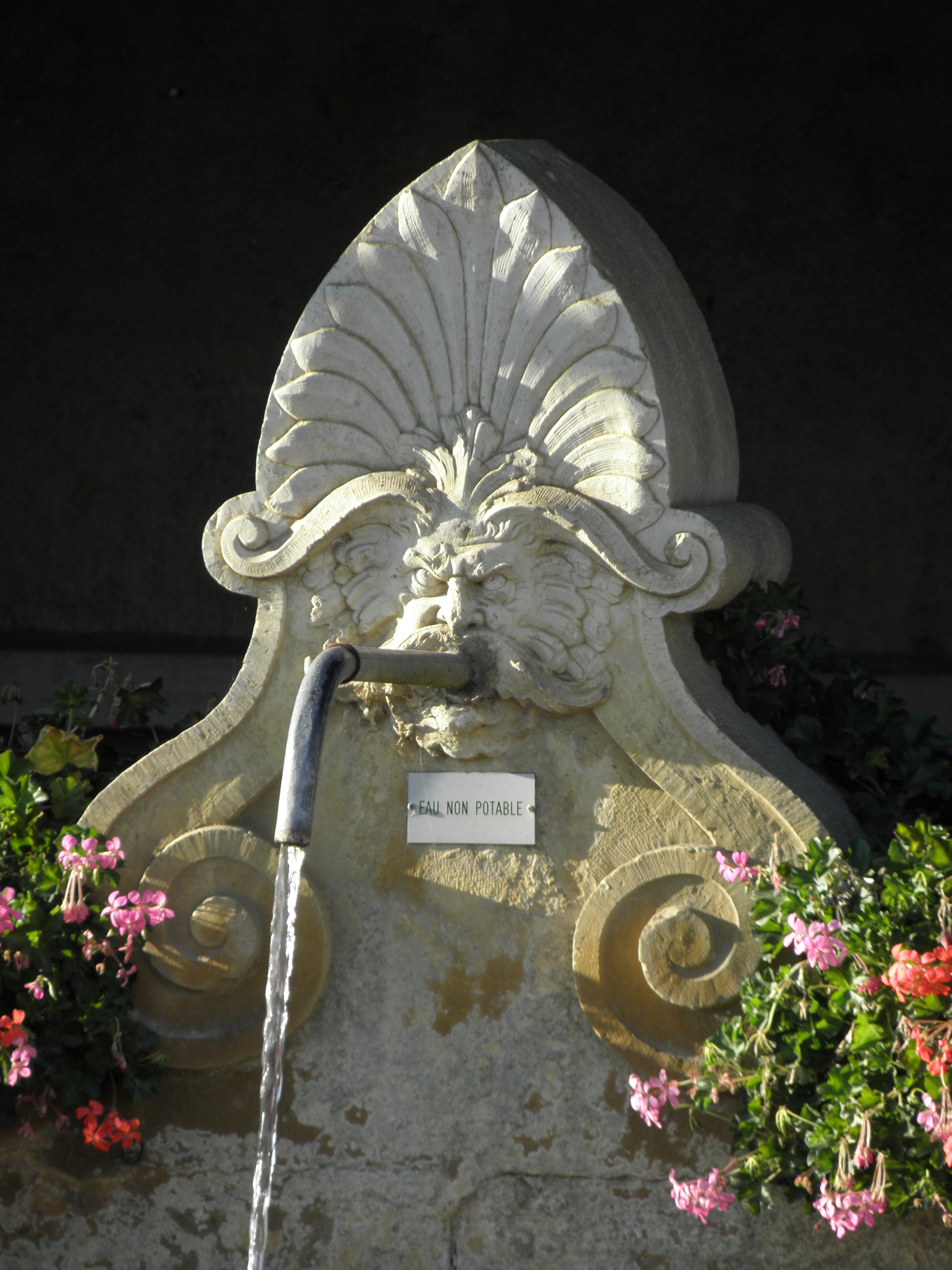
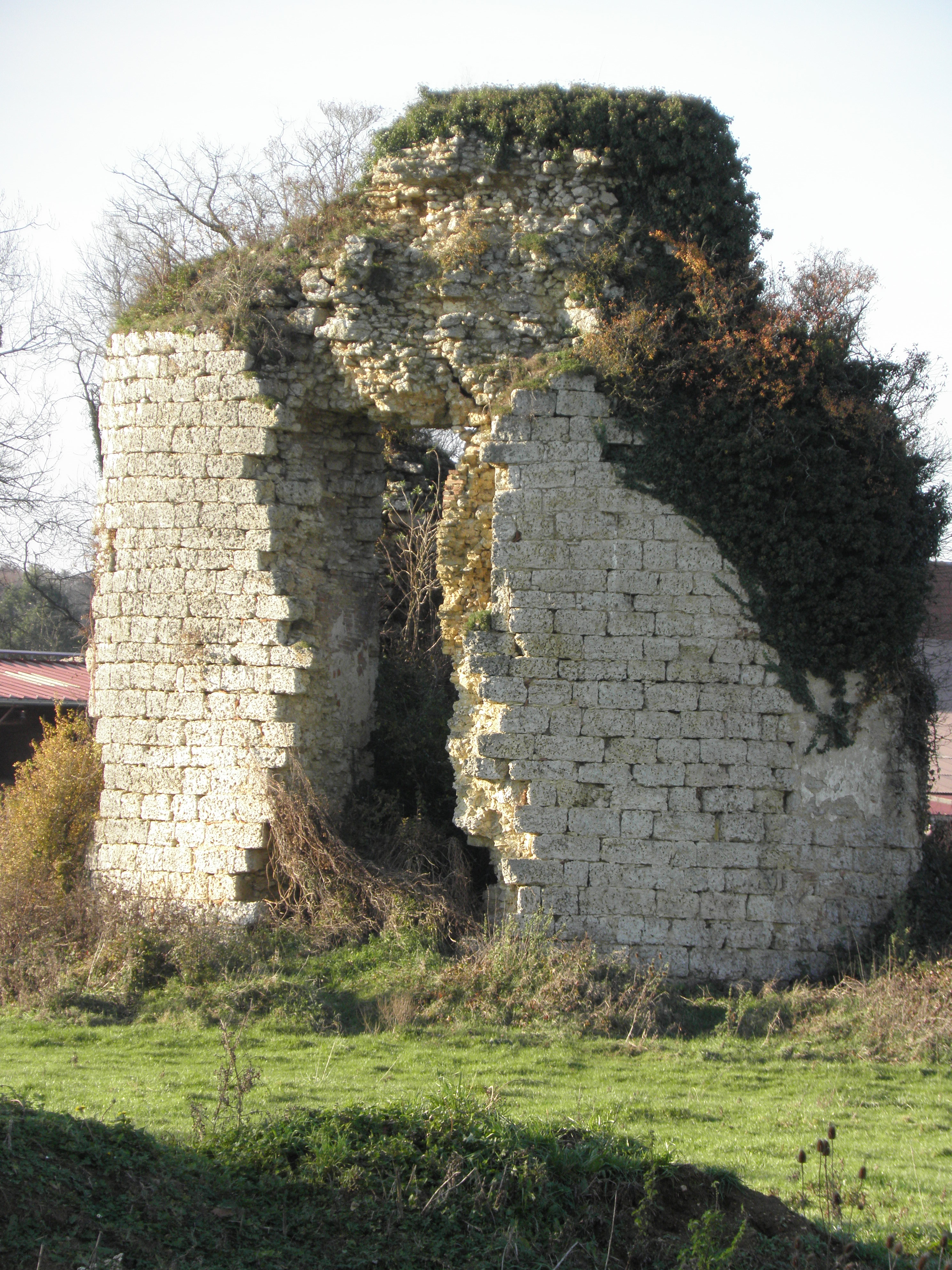
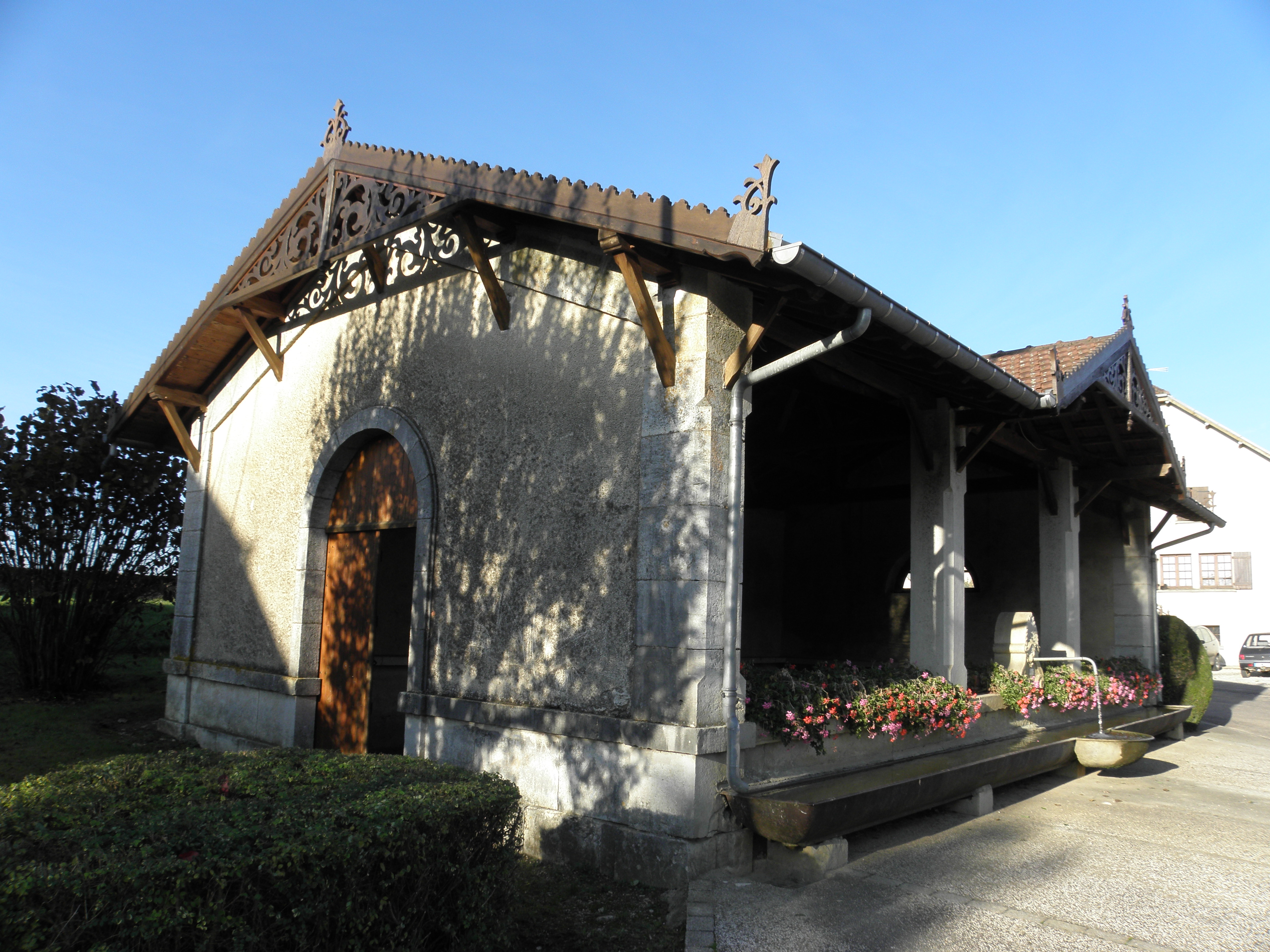
- Location of Champtonnay
- Location within France Location within Bourgogne-Franche-Comté
- Coordinates: 47°23′N 5°40′E
- Country: France
- Region: Bourgogne-Franche-Comté
- Department: Haute-Saône
- Arrondissement: Vesoul
- Canton: Gray

Government
  - Mayor (2020–2026): Yohann Poirot
- Area^{1}: 5.24 km^{2} (2.02 sq mi)
- Highest elevation: 259 m (850 ft)
- Lowest elevation: 212 m (696 ft)
- Population (2023): 79
  - Density: 15/km^{2} (39/sq mi)
- Time zone: UTC+01:00 (CET)
  - Summer (DST): UTC+02:00 (CEST)
- INSEE/Postal code: 70124 /70100
- ^{1} French Land Register data, which excludes lakes, ponds, glaciers > 1 km^{2} (0.386 sq mi or 247 acres) and river estuaries.

Champtonnay (French pronunciation: [ʃɑ̃tɔnɛ]) is a commune in the Haute-Saône department in the region of Bourgogne-Franche-Comté in eastern France. As of January 2018, the population is 96.

== See also ==
- Communes of the Haute-Saône department
