= Apremont, Haute-Saône =

Apremont
- Commune
- Coat of arms
- Location of Apremont
- Location within France Location within Bourgogne-Franche-Comté
- Coordinates: 47°23′39″N 5°32′39″E
- Country: France
- Region: Bourgogne-Franche-Comté
- Department: Haute-Saône
- Arrondissement: Vesoul
- Canton: Gray

Government
  - Mayor (2020–2026): Jean-Marie Chaudot
- Area^{1}: 14.40 km^{2} (5.56 sq mi)
- Highest elevation: 226 m (741 ft)
- Lowest elevation: 186 m (610 ft)
- Population (2023): 437
  - Density: 30.3/km^{2} (78.6/sq mi)
- Time zone: UTC+01:00 (CET)
  - Summer (DST): UTC+02:00 (CEST)
- INSEE/Postal code: 70024 /70100
- ^{1} French Land Register data, which excludes lakes, ponds, glaciers > 1 km^{2} (0.386 sq mi or 247 acres) and river estuaries.

Apremont (French pronunciation: [apʁəmɔ̃]) is a commune in the Haute-Saône department in the Bourgogne-Franche-Comté region in eastern France.

== Demography ==
Historical population
Year	Pop.	±% p.a.
1968	372	—
1975	380	+0.30%
1982	372	−0.30%
1990	362	−0.34%
1999	362	+0.00%
2007	412	+1.63%
2012	456	+2.05%
2017	460	+0.17%
2023	437	−0.85%
Source: INSEE

== See also ==
- Communes of the Haute-Saône department
