= Noiron =

- Commune
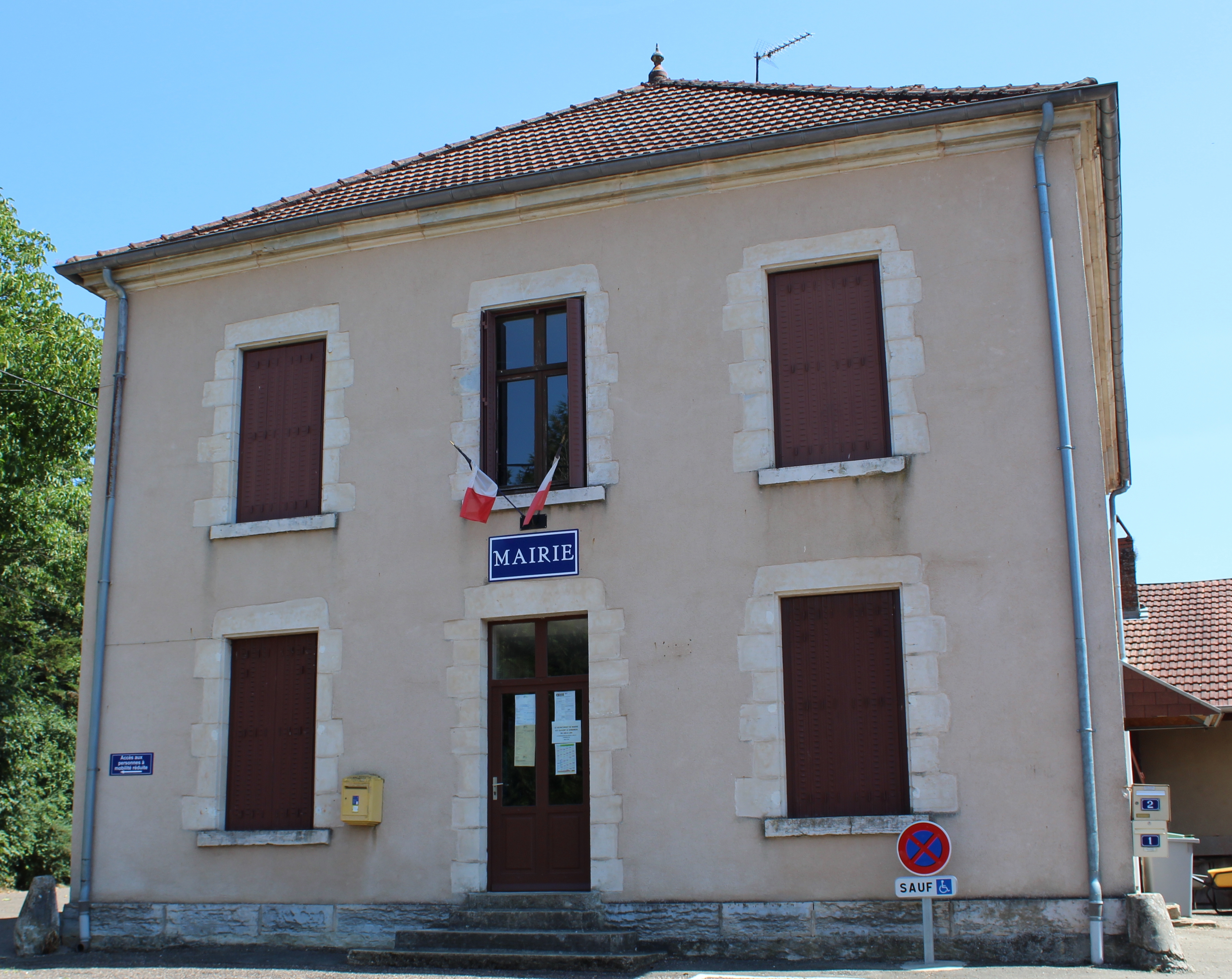
- The town hall in Noiron
- Location of Noiron
- Location within France Location within Bourgogne-Franche-Comté
- Coordinates: 47°23′05″N 5°37′47″E
- Country: France
- Region: Bourgogne-Franche-Comté
- Department: Haute-Saône
- Arrondissement: Vesoul
- Canton: Gray

Government
  - Mayor (2020–2026): Olivier Vuillier
- Area^{1}: 5.58 km^{2} (2.15 sq mi)
- Highest elevation: 244 m (801 ft)
- Lowest elevation: 199 m (653 ft)
- Population (2023): 58
  - Density: 10/km^{2} (27/sq mi)
- Time zone: UTC+01:00 (CET)
  - Summer (DST): UTC+02:00 (CEST)
- INSEE/Postal code: 70389 /70100
- ^{1} French Land Register data, which excludes lakes, ponds, glaciers > 1 km^{2} (0.386 sq mi or 247 acres) and river estuaries.

Noiron (French pronunciation: [nwaʁɔ̃]) is a commune in the Haute-Saône department in the region of Bourgogne-Franche-Comté in eastern France.

== See also ==
- Communes of the Haute-Saône department
