= Vandelans =

- Commune
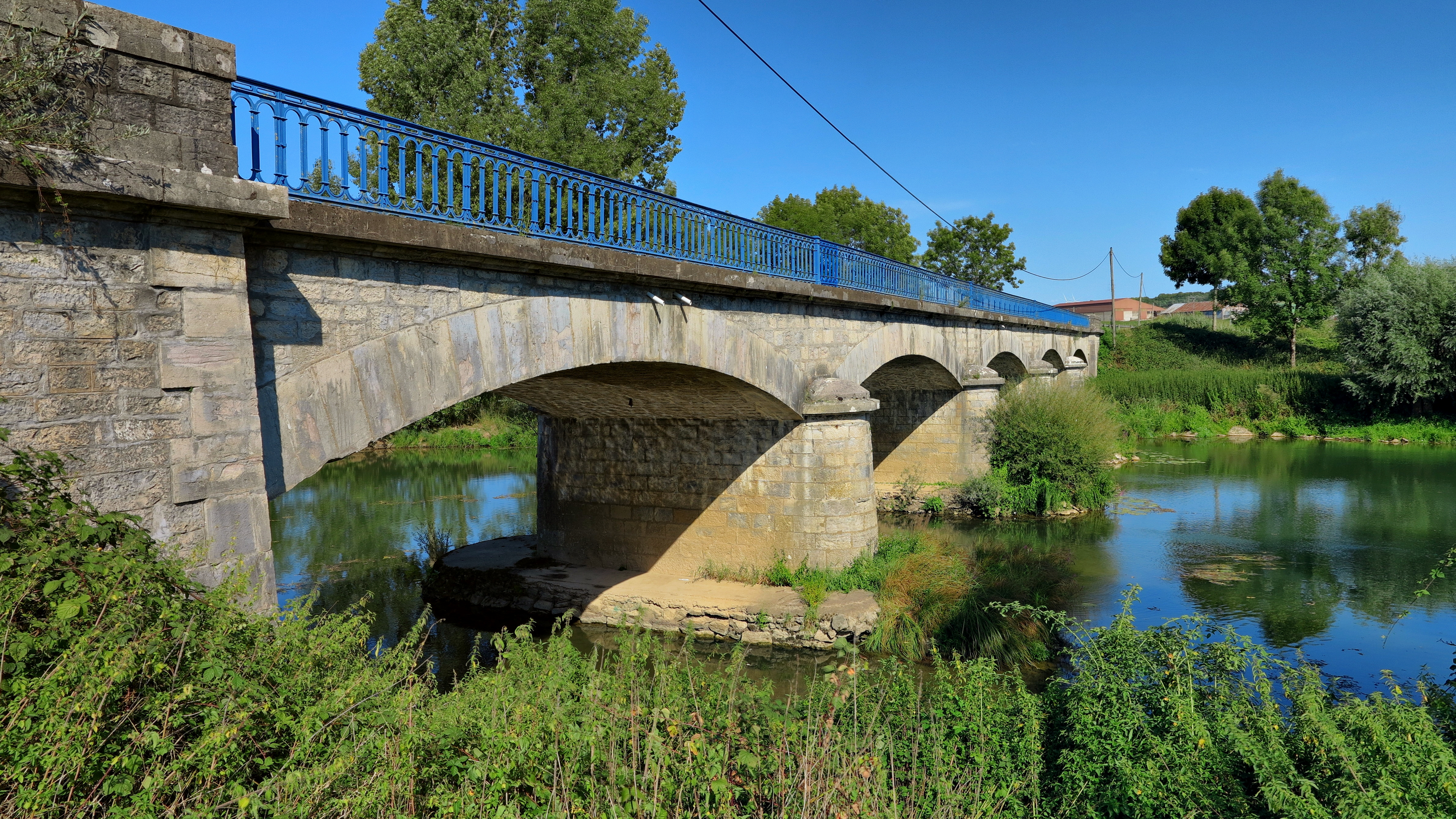
- The bridge over the Ognon river in Vandelans

- Coat of arms
- Location of Vandelans
- Location within France Location within Bourgogne-Franche-Comté
- Coordinates: 47°23′43″N 6°09′55″E
- Country: France
- Region: Bourgogne-Franche-Comté
- Department: Haute-Saône
- Arrondissement: Vesoul
- Canton: Rioz

Government
  - Mayor (2023–2026): Christophe Deschaseaux
- Area^{1}: 3.08 km^{2} (1.19 sq mi)
- Highest elevation: 272 m (892 ft)
- Lowest elevation: 225 m (738 ft)
- Population (2023): 113
  - Density: 36.7/km^{2} (95.0/sq mi)
- Time zone: UTC+01:00 (CET)
  - Summer (DST): UTC+02:00 (CEST)
- INSEE/Postal code: 70519 /70190
- ^{1} French Land Register data, which excludes lakes, ponds, glaciers > 1 km^{2} (0.386 sq mi or 247 acres) and river estuaries.

Vandelans (French pronunciation: [vɑ̃dlɑ̃]) is a commune in the Haute-Saône department in the region of Bourgogne-Franche-Comté in eastern France.

== See also ==
- Communes of the Haute-Saône department
