= Cresancey =

- Commune
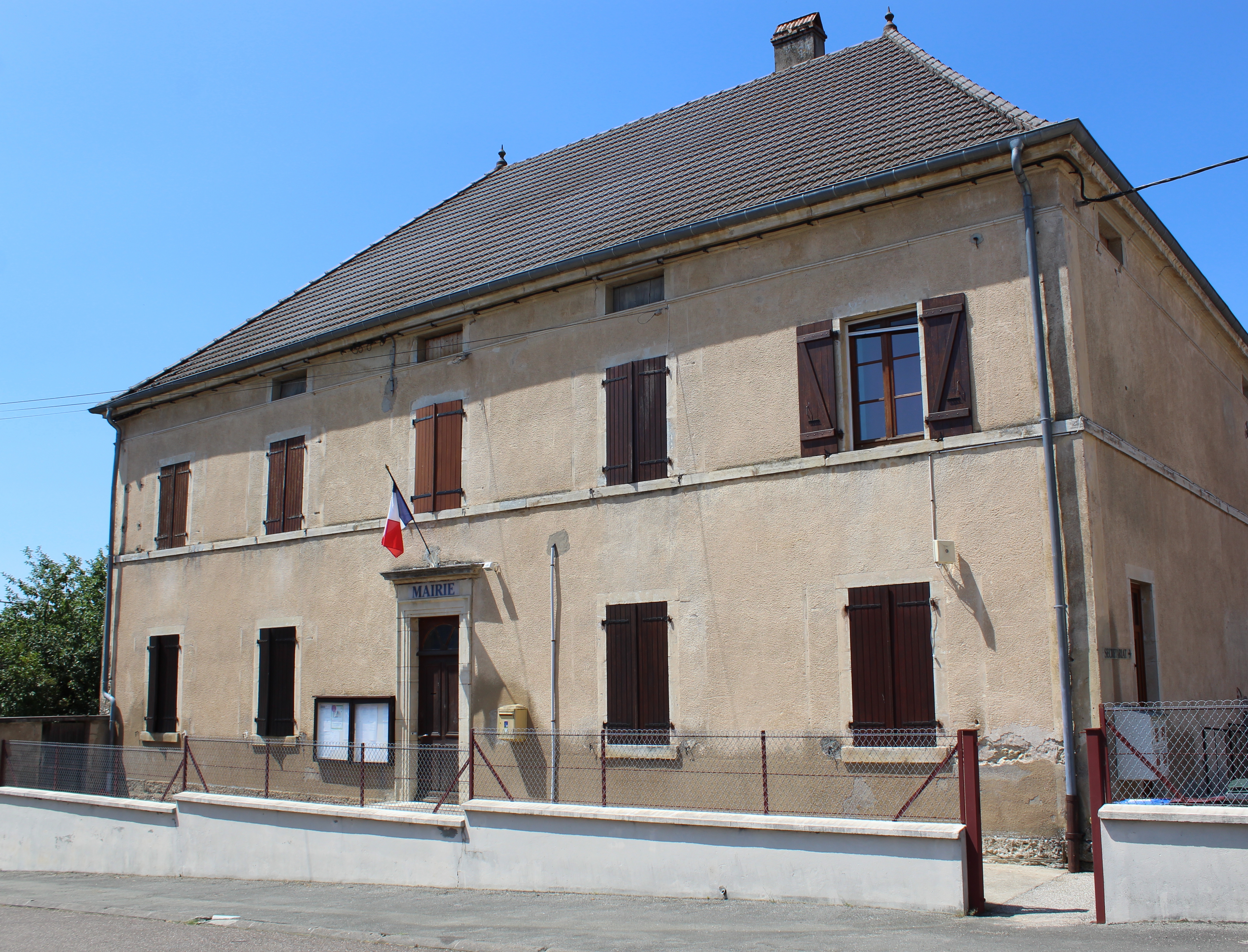
- The town hall in Cresancey

- Coat of arms
- Location of Cresancey
- Location within France Location within Bourgogne-Franche-Comté
- Coordinates: 47°23′37″N 5°39′16″E
- Country: France
- Region: Bourgogne-Franche-Comté
- Department: Haute-Saône
- Arrondissement: Vesoul
- Canton: Gray
- Area^{1}: 9.60 km^{2} (3.71 sq mi)
- Highest elevation: 248 m (814 ft)
- Lowest elevation: 202 m (663 ft)
- Population (2023): 181
  - Density: 18.9/km^{2} (48.8/sq mi)
- Time zone: UTC+01:00 (CET)
  - Summer (DST): UTC+02:00 (CEST)
- INSEE/Postal code: 70185 /70100
- ^{1} French Land Register data, which excludes lakes, ponds, glaciers > 1 km^{2} (0.386 sq mi or 247 acres) and river estuaries.

Cresancey is a commune in the Haute-Saône department in the region of Bourgogne-Franche-Comté in eastern France.

== See also ==
- Communes of the Haute-Saône department
