= Sauvigney-lès-Gray =

- Commune
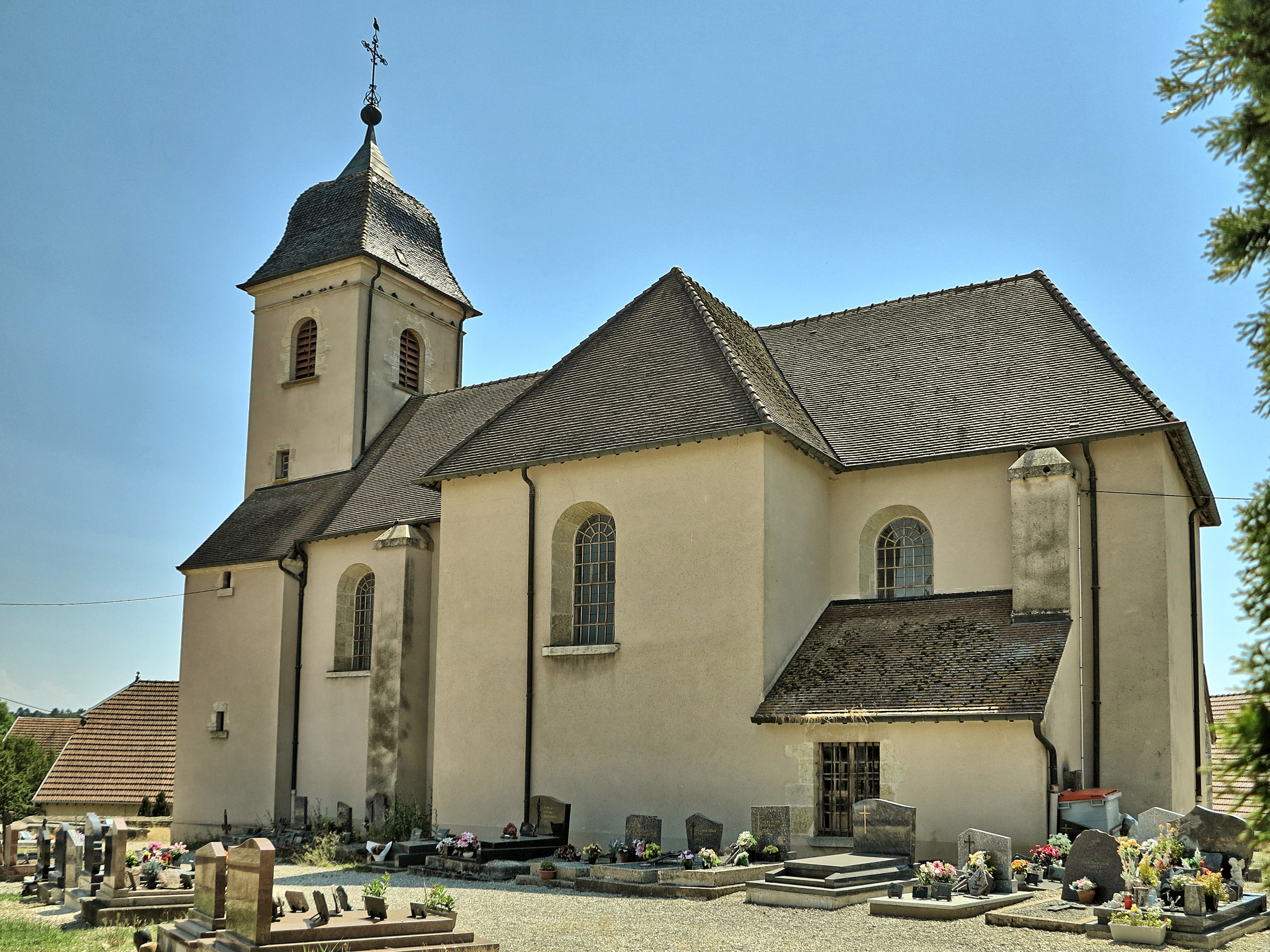
- The church in Sauvigney-lès-Gray

- Coat of arms
- Location of Sauvigney-lès-Gray
- Location within France Location within Bourgogne-Franche-Comté
- Coordinates: 47°26′53″N 5°44′31″E
- Country: France
- Region: Bourgogne-Franche-Comté
- Department: Haute-Saône
- Arrondissement: Vesoul
- Canton: Gray

Government
  - Mayor (2020–2026): Jocelyn Chenevier
- Area^{1}: 10.44 km^{2} (4.03 sq mi)
- Highest elevation: 248 m (814 ft)
- Lowest elevation: 192 m (630 ft)
- Population (2023): 100
  - Density: 9.6/km^{2} (25/sq mi)
- Time zone: UTC+01:00 (CET)
  - Summer (DST): UTC+02:00 (CEST)
- INSEE/Postal code: 70479 /70100
- ^{1} French Land Register data, which excludes lakes, ponds, glaciers > 1 km^{2} (0.386 sq mi or 247 acres) and river estuaries.

Sauvigney-lès-Gray (French pronunciation: [soviɲɛ lɛ ɡʁɛ], literally Sauvigney near Gray) is a commune in the Haute-Saône department in the region of Bourgogne-Franche-Comté in eastern France.

== See also ==
- Communes of the Haute-Saône department
