= Velloreille-lès-Choye =

- Commune
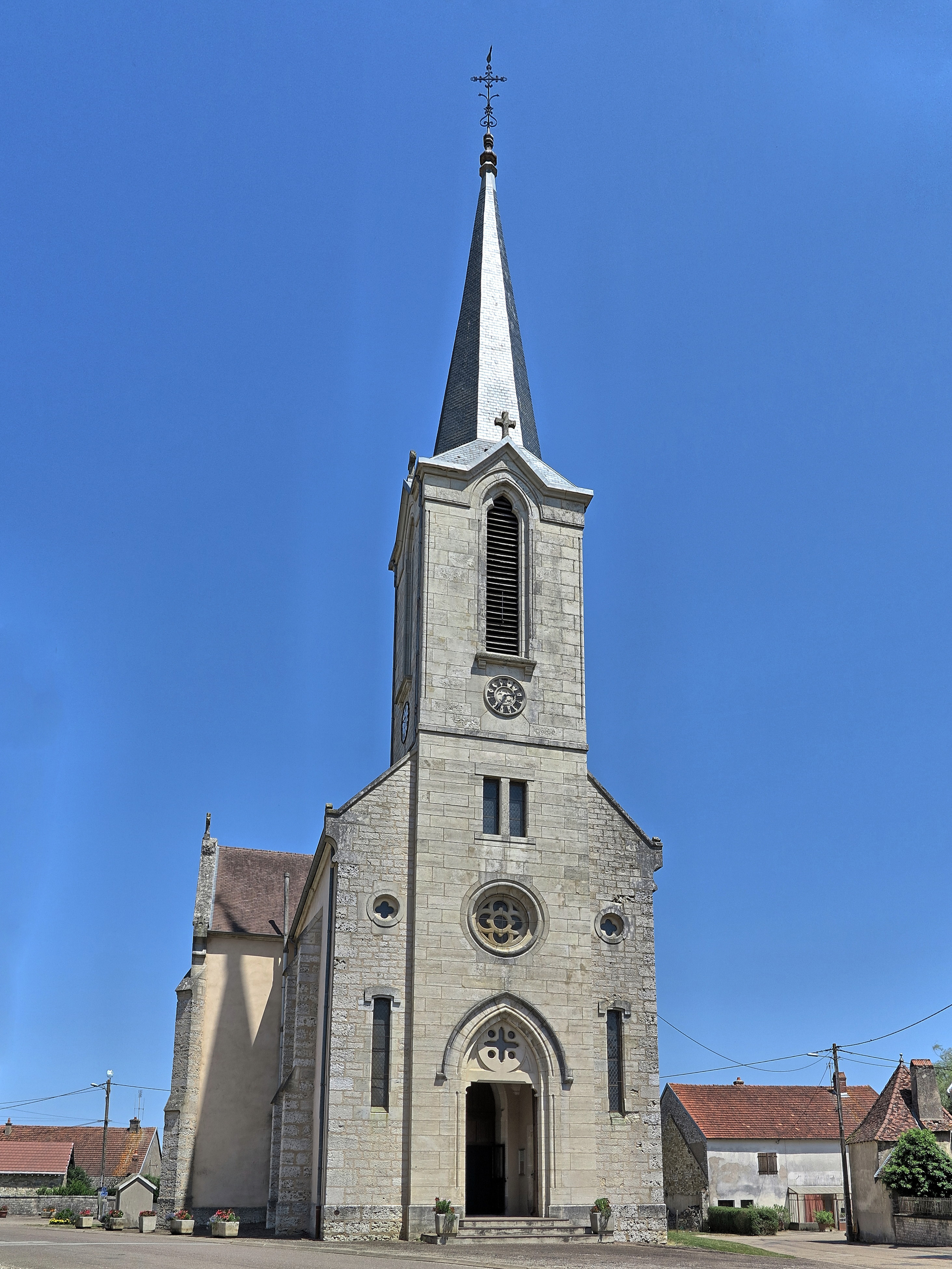
- The church in Velloreille-lès-Choye
- Location of Velloreille-lès-Choye
- Location within France Location within Bourgogne-Franche-Comté
- Coordinates: 47°23′35″N 5°44′14″E
- Country: France
- Region: Bourgogne-Franche-Comté
- Department: Haute-Saône
- Arrondissement: Vesoul
- Canton: Marnay
- Area^{1}: 4.13 km^{2} (1.59 sq mi)
- Highest elevation: 262 m (860 ft)
- Lowest elevation: 209 m (686 ft)
- Population (2023): 78
  - Density: 19/km^{2} (49/sq mi)
- Time zone: UTC+01:00 (CET)
  - Summer (DST): UTC+02:00 (CEST)
- INSEE/Postal code: 70540 /70700
- ^{1} French Land Register data, which excludes lakes, ponds, glaciers > 1 km^{2} (0.386 sq mi or 247 acres) and river estuaries.

Velloreille-lès-Choye is a commune in the Haute-Saône department in the region of Bourgogne-Franche-Comté in eastern France.

== See also ==
- Communes of the Haute-Saône department
