= Ancier =

- Commune
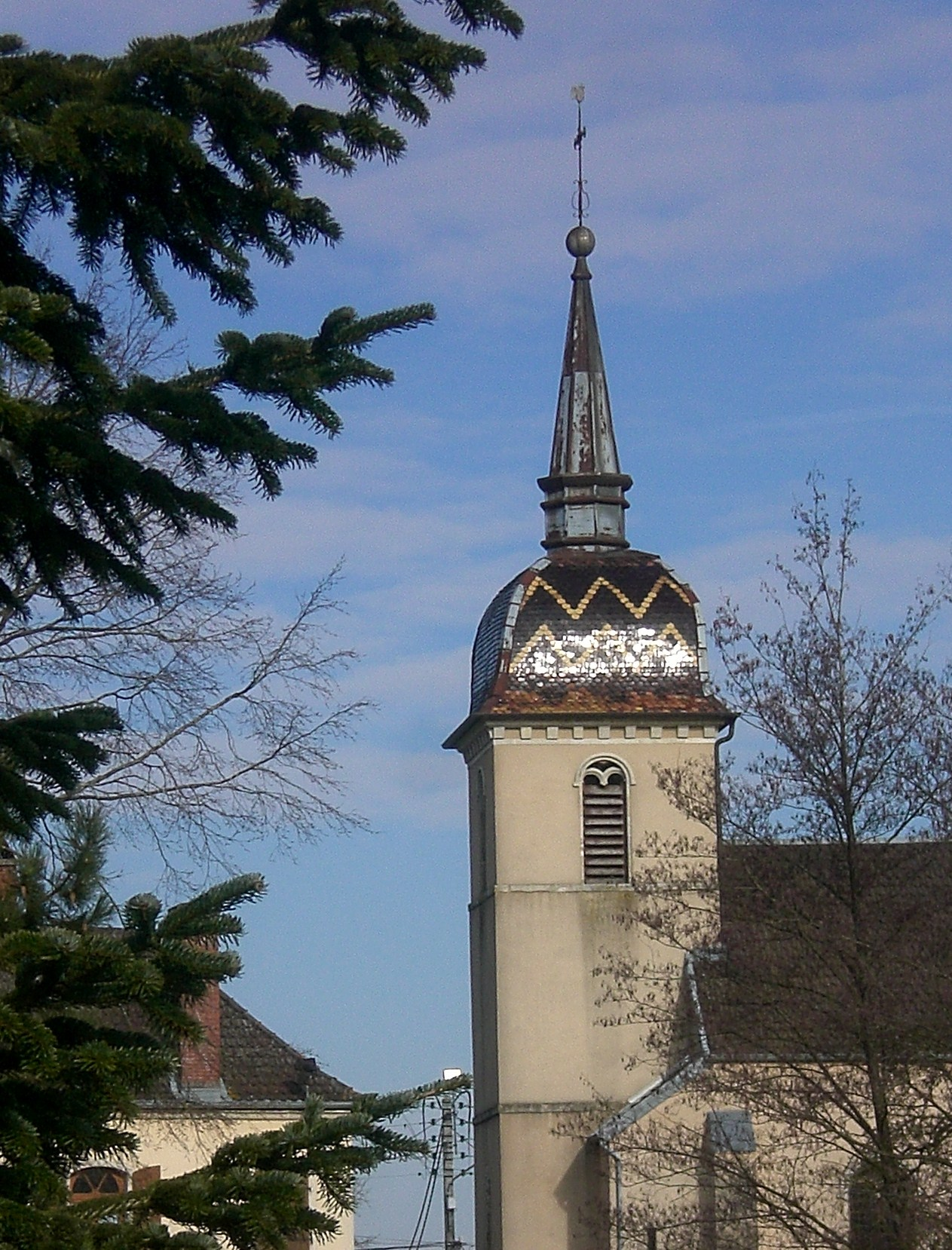
- The church in Ancier
- Location of Ancier
- Location within France Location within Bourgogne-Franche-Comté
- Coordinates: 47°26′56″N 5°37′57″E
- Country: France
- Region: Bourgogne-Franche-Comté
- Department: Haute-Saône
- Arrondissement: Vesoul
- Canton: Gray
- Intercommunality: Val de Gray

Government
  - Mayor (2020–2026): Nadine Daguet
- Area^{1}: 4.42 km^{2} (1.71 sq mi)
- Highest elevation: 229 m (751 ft)
- Lowest elevation: 188 m (617 ft)
- Population (2023): 523
  - Density: 118/km^{2} (306/sq mi)
- Time zone: UTC+01:00 (CET)
  - Summer (DST): UTC+02:00 (CEST)
- INSEE/Postal code: 70018 /70100
- ^{1} French Land Register data, which excludes lakes, ponds, glaciers > 1 km^{2} (0.386 sq mi or 247 acres) and river estuaries.

Ancier is a commune in the Haute-Saône department in the region of Bourgogne-Franche-Comté in eastern France.

== See also ==
- Communes of the Haute-Saône department
