= Onay =

- Commune
- Location of Onay
- Location within France Location within Bourgogne-Franche-Comté
- Coordinates: 47°23′11″N 5°41′17″E
- Country: France
- Region: Bourgogne-Franche-Comté
- Department: Haute-Saône
- Arrondissement: Vesoul
- Canton: Gray

Government
  - Mayor (2020–2026): Jean-Noël Rousset
- Area^{1}: 6.68 km^{2} (2.58 sq mi)
- Highest elevation: 248 m (814 ft)
- Lowest elevation: 206 m (676 ft)
- Population (2023): 61
  - Density: 9.1/km^{2} (24/sq mi)
- Time zone: UTC+01:00 (CET)
  - Summer (DST): UTC+02:00 (CEST)
- INSEE/Postal code: 70394 /70100
- ^{1} French Land Register data, which excludes lakes, ponds, glaciers > 1 km^{2} (0.386 sq mi or 247 acres) and river estuaries.

Onay (French pronunciation: [ɔnɛ]) is a commune in the Haute-Saône department in the region of Bourgogne-Franche-Comté in eastern France.

It is located 12 km south east of Gray, 60 km east of Dijon and 40 km north west of Besançon, on the route D177.

== See also ==
- Communes of the Haute-Saône department
