= Angirey =

- Commune
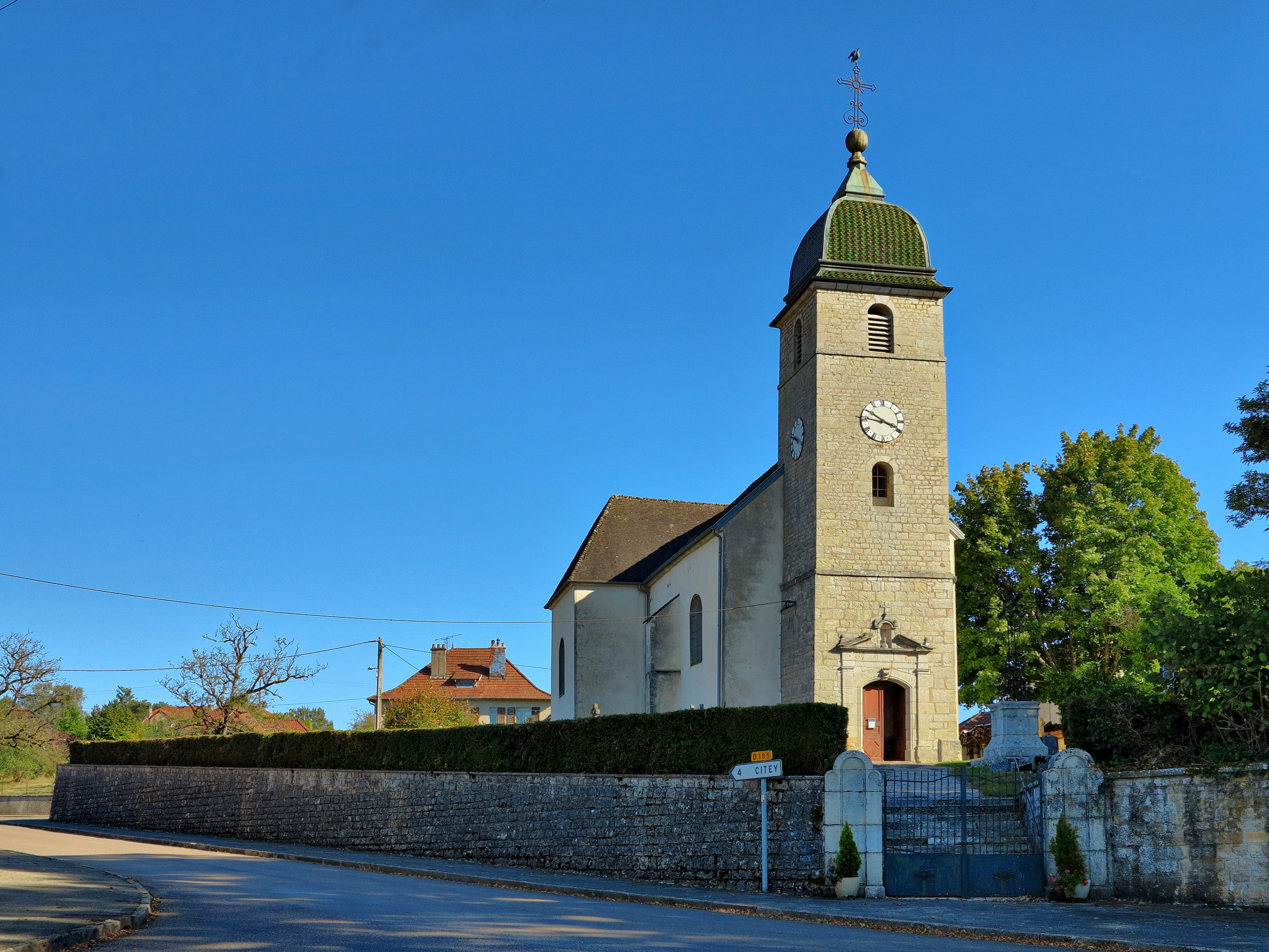
- The church in Angirey
- Location of Angirey
- Location within France Location within Bourgogne-Franche-Comté
- Coordinates: 47°27′21″N 5°46′05″E
- Country: France
- Region: Bourgogne-Franche-Comté
- Department: Haute-Saône
- Arrondissement: Vesoul
- Canton: Gray
- Intercommunality: Monts de Gy

Government
  - Mayor (2020–2026): Chantal Faradon
- Area^{1}: 8.87 km^{2} (3.42 sq mi)
- Highest elevation: 260 m (850 ft)
- Lowest elevation: 198 m (650 ft)
- Population (2023): 152
  - Density: 17.1/km^{2} (44.4/sq mi)
- Time zone: UTC+01:00 (CET)
  - Summer (DST): UTC+02:00 (CEST)
- INSEE/Postal code: 70022 /70700
- ^{1} French Land Register data, which excludes lakes, ponds, glaciers > 1 km^{2} (0.386 sq mi or 247 acres) and river estuaries.

Angirey (French pronunciation: [ɑ̃ʒiʁɛ]) is a commune in the Haute-Saône department in the region of Bourgogne-Franche-Comté in eastern France.

== See also ==
- Communes of the Haute-Saône department
