= Montarlot-lès-Rioz =

- Commune
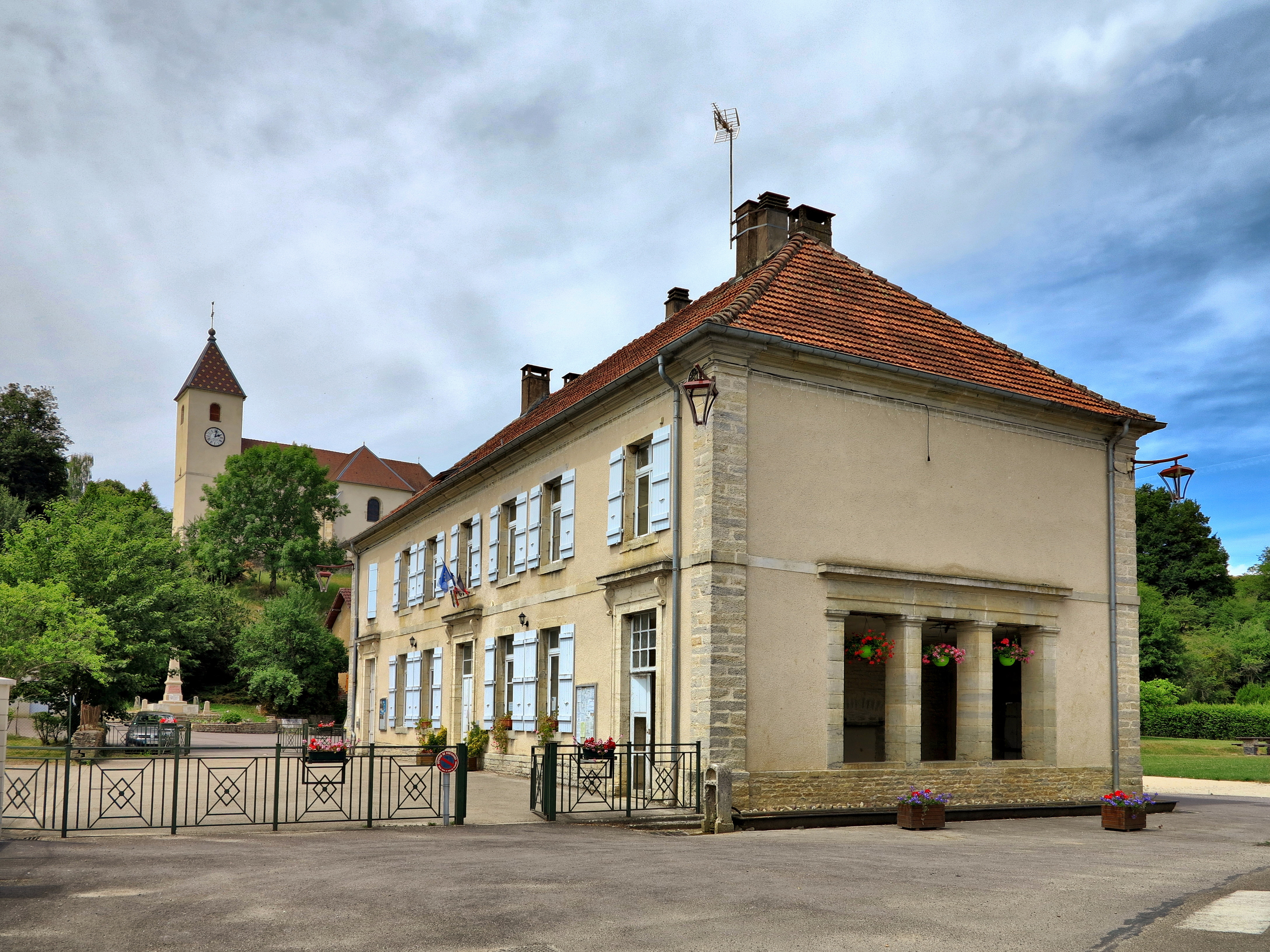
- The town hall and church in Montarlot-lès-Rioz
- Location of Montarlot-lès-Rioz
- Location within France Location within Bourgogne-Franche-Comté
- Coordinates: 47°25′05″N 5°59′50″E
- Country: France
- Region: Bourgogne-Franche-Comté
- Department: Haute-Saône
- Arrondissement: Vesoul
- Canton: Rioz

Government
  - Mayor (2020–2026): Jean-Luc Bouton
- Area^{1}: 9.66 km^{2} (3.73 sq mi)
- Highest elevation: 365 m (1,198 ft)
- Lowest elevation: 243 m (797 ft)
- Population (2023): 313
  - Density: 32.4/km^{2} (83.9/sq mi)
- Time zone: UTC+01:00 (CET)
  - Summer (DST): UTC+02:00 (CEST)
- INSEE/Postal code: 70355 /70190
- ^{1} French Land Register data, which excludes lakes, ponds, glaciers > 1 km^{2} (0.386 sq mi or 247 acres) and river estuaries.

Montarlot-lès-Rioz (French pronunciation: [mɔ̃taʁlɔ lɛ ʁjo], literally Montarlot near Rioz) is a commune in the Haute-Saône department in the region of Bourgogne-Franche-Comté in eastern France.

== See also ==
- Communes of the Haute-Saône department
