= Beaumotte-Aubertans =

- Commune
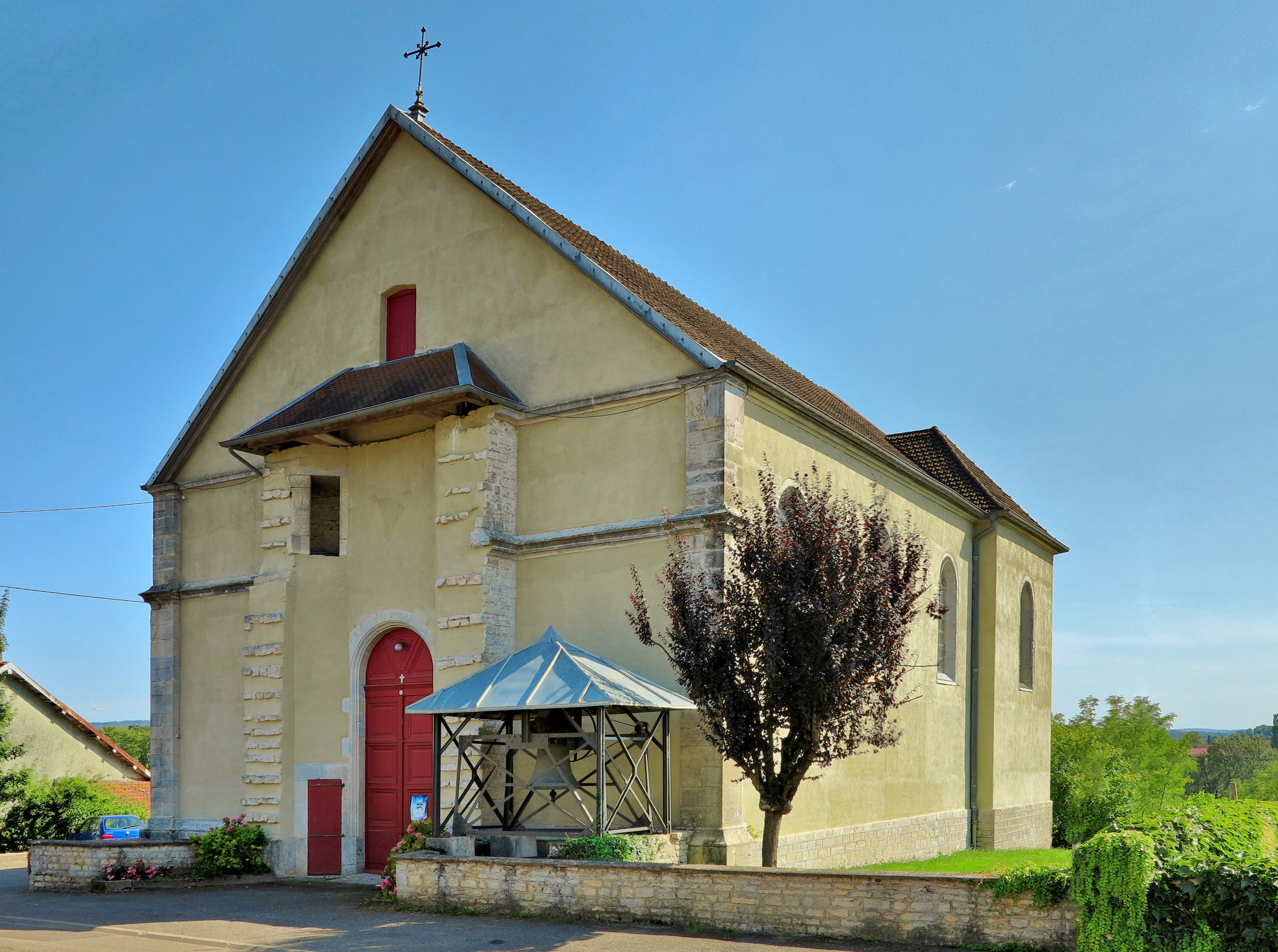
- The church in Beaumotte

- Coat of arms
- Location of Beaumotte-Aubertans
- Location within France Location within Bourgogne-Franche-Comté
- Coordinates: 47°25′15″N 6°10′48″E
- Country: France
- Region: Bourgogne-Franche-Comté
- Department: Haute-Saône
- Arrondissement: Vesoul
- Canton: Rioz

Government
  - Mayor (2020–2026): Christophe Grangeot
- Area^{1}: 13.57 km^{2} (5.24 sq mi)
- Highest elevation: 328 m (1,076 ft)
- Lowest elevation: 228 m (748 ft)
- Population (2023): 475
  - Density: 35.0/km^{2} (90.7/sq mi)
- Time zone: UTC+01:00 (CET)
  - Summer (DST): UTC+02:00 (CEST)
- INSEE/Postal code: 70059 /70190
- ^{1} French Land Register data, which excludes lakes, ponds, glaciers > 1 km^{2} (0.386 sq mi or 247 acres) and river estuaries.

Beaumotte-Aubertans (French pronunciation: [bomɔt obɛʁtɑ̃]) is a commune in the Haute-Saône department in the region of Bourgogne-Franche-Comté in eastern France.

== Overview ==
The commune was created in December 1972 by merging the villages of Beaumotte-lès-Montbozon and Aubertans. Originally named Beaumotte-lès-Montbozon-et-Aubertans, the commune was renamed Beaumotte-Aubertans in 1977. The village of Aubertans is about 4.5 km to the north of the village now called Beaumotte-Aubertans.

The inhabitants of Beaumotte-Aubertans are called the Beaumottois, and the inhabitants of Aubertans are called the Aubertanois.

== See also ==
- Communes of the Haute-Saône department
