= Bonboillon =

- Commune
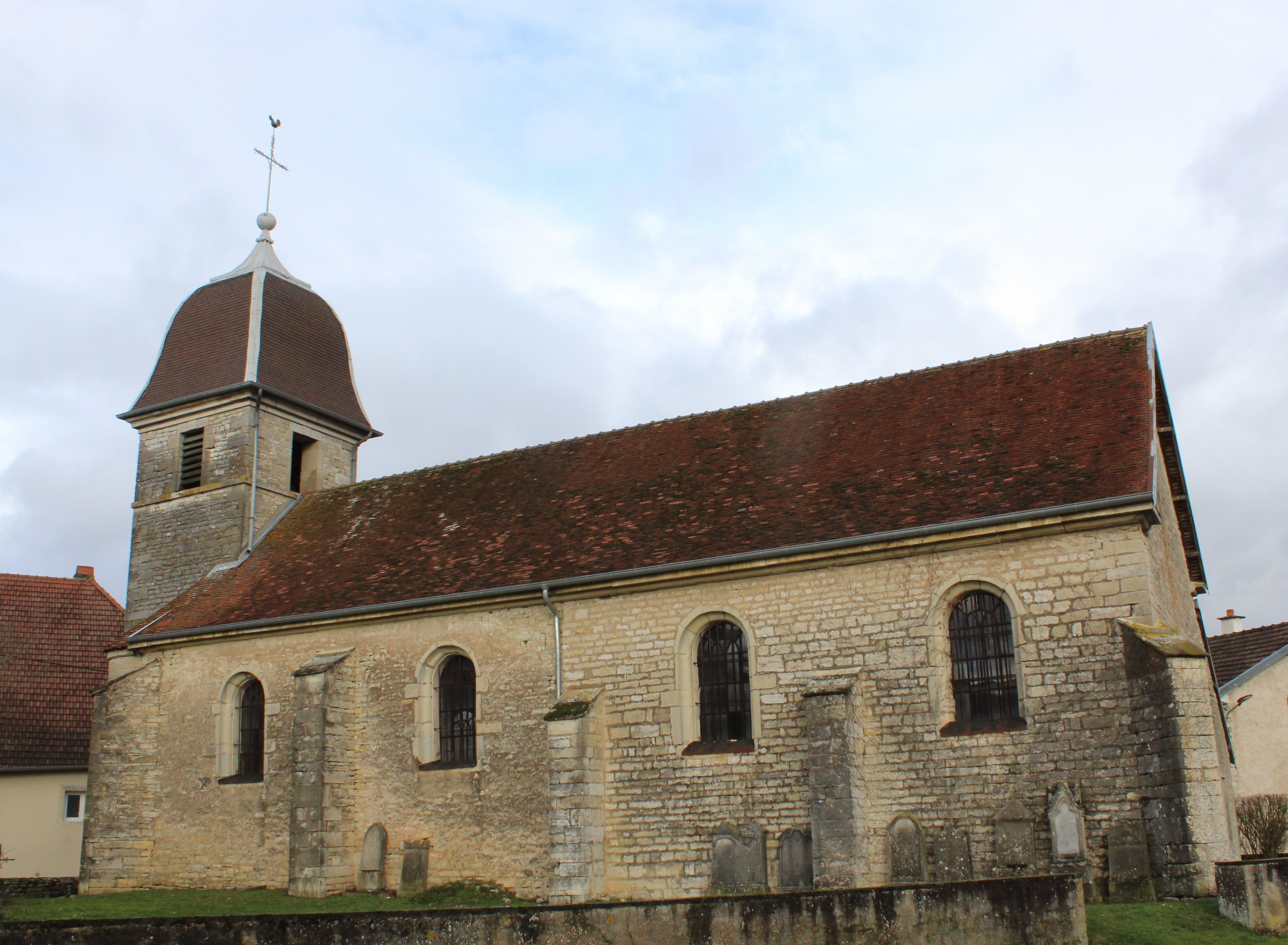
- The church in Bonboillon
- Location of Bonboillon
- Location within France Location within Bourgogne-Franche-Comté
- Coordinates: 47°20′17″N 5°42′15″E
- Country: France
- Region: Bourgogne-Franche-Comté
- Department: Haute-Saône
- Arrondissement: Vesoul
- Canton: Marnay

Government
  - Mayor (2023–2026): Aline Mulin
- Area^{1}: 4.44 km^{2} (1.71 sq mi)
- Highest elevation: 297 m (974 ft)
- Lowest elevation: 242 m (794 ft)
- Population (2023): 195
  - Density: 43.9/km^{2} (114/sq mi)
- Time zone: UTC+01:00 (CET)
  - Summer (DST): UTC+02:00 (CEST)
- INSEE/Postal code: 70075 /70150
- ^{1} French Land Register data, which excludes lakes, ponds, glaciers > 1 km^{2} (0.386 sq mi or 247 acres) and river estuaries.

Bonboillon (French pronunciation: [bɔ̃bwajɔ̃]) is a commune in the Haute-Saône department in the region of Bourgogne-Franche-Comté in eastern France.

== See also ==
- Communes of the Haute-Saône department
