= Bresilley =

- Commune
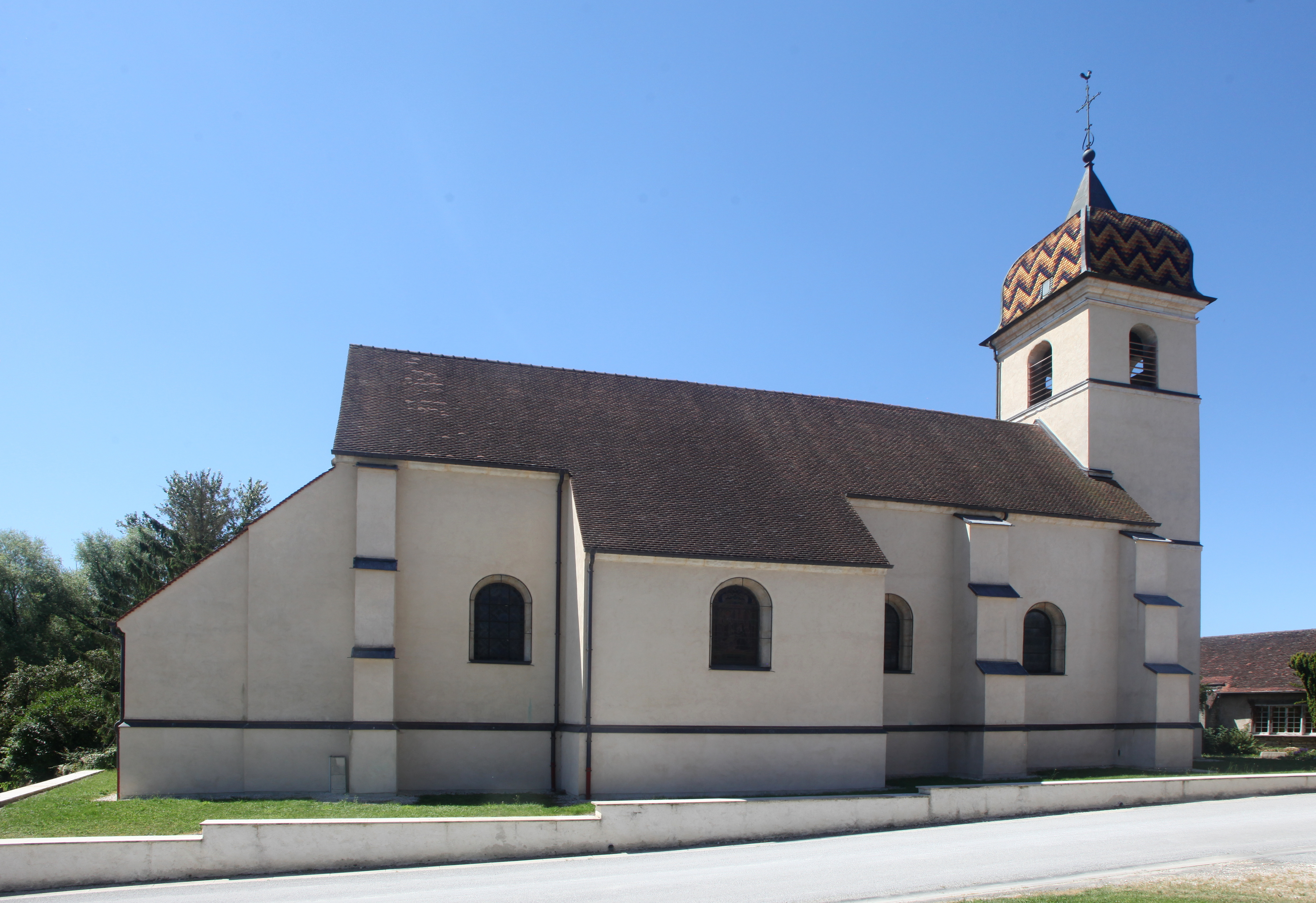
- The church in Bresilley

- Coat of arms
- Location of Bresilley
- Location within France Location within Bourgogne-Franche-Comté
- Coordinates: 47°15′33″N 5°38′32″E
- Country: France
- Region: Bourgogne-Franche-Comté
- Department: Haute-Saône
- Arrondissement: Vesoul
- Canton: Marnay
- Area^{1}: 3.54 km^{2} (1.37 sq mi)
- Highest elevation: 221 m (725 ft)
- Lowest elevation: 192 m (630 ft)
- Population (2023): 189
  - Density: 53.4/km^{2} (138/sq mi)
- Time zone: UTC+01:00 (CET)
  - Summer (DST): UTC+02:00 (CEST)
- INSEE/Postal code: 70092 /70140
- ^{1} French Land Register data, which excludes lakes, ponds, glaciers > 1 km^{2} (0.386 sq mi or 247 acres) and river estuaries.

Bresilley is a commune in the Haute-Saône department in the region of Bourgogne-Franche-Comté in eastern France.

== Geography ==
Bresilley is situated beside the Ognon river, which rises in the Vosges mountains and joins the Saône at Pontailler-sur-Saône.

== See also ==
- Communes of the Haute-Saône department
