= Saint-Broing =

- Commune
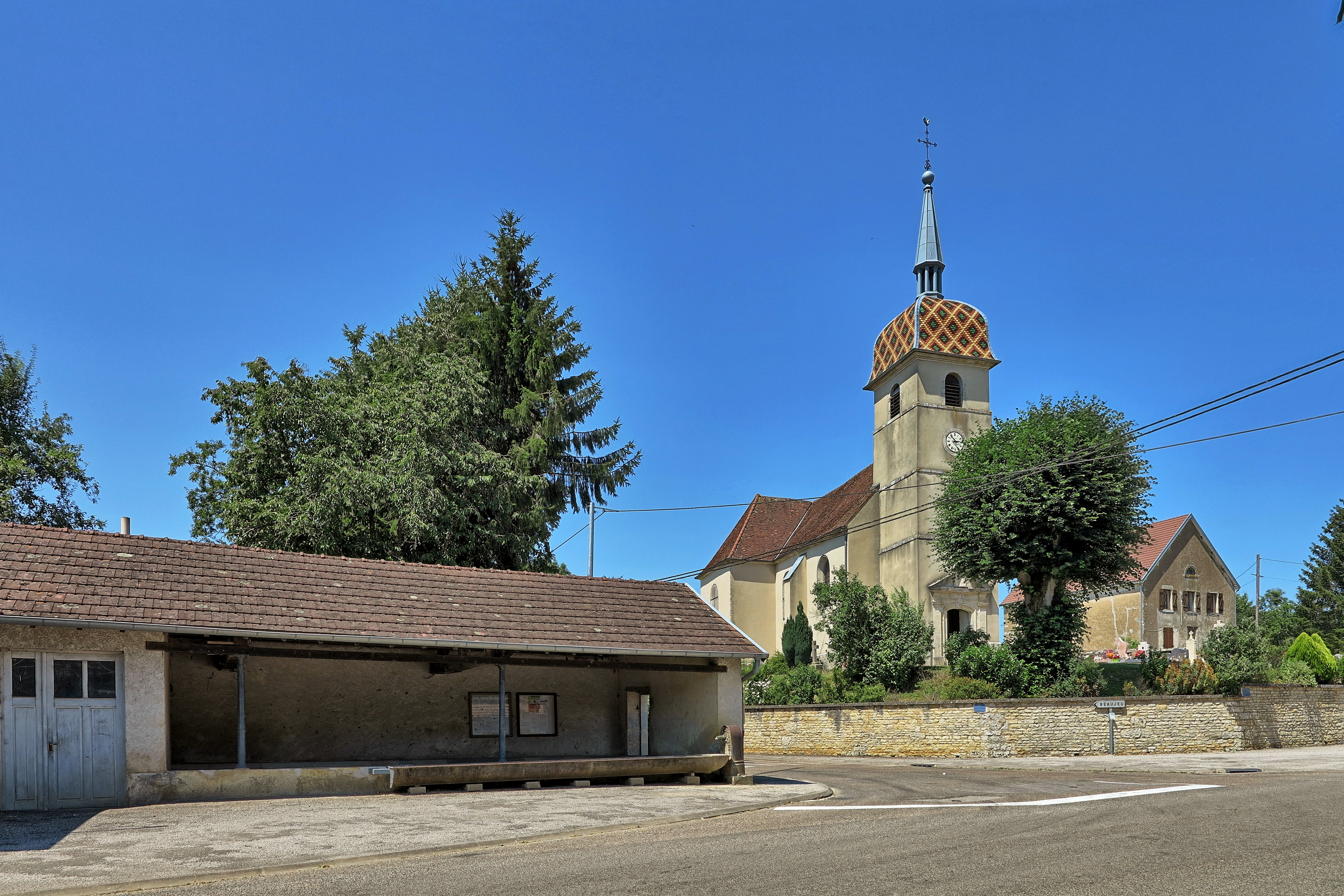
- The wash house and church in Saint-Broing

- Coat of arms
- Location of Saint-Broing
- Location within France Location within Bourgogne-Franche-Comté
- Coordinates: 47°27′00″N 5°41′56″E
- Country: France
- Region: Bourgogne-Franche-Comté
- Department: Haute-Saône
- Arrondissement: Vesoul
- Canton: Gray

Government
  - Mayor (2020–2026): Didier Moreau
- Area^{1}: 10.17 km^{2} (3.93 sq mi)
- Highest elevation: 231 m (758 ft)
- Lowest elevation: 189 m (620 ft)
- Population (2023): 105
  - Density: 10.3/km^{2} (26.7/sq mi)
- Time zone: UTC+01:00 (CET)
  - Summer (DST): UTC+02:00 (CEST)
- INSEE/Postal code: 70461 /70100
- ^{1} French Land Register data, which excludes lakes, ponds, glaciers > 1 km^{2} (0.386 sq mi or 247 acres) and river estuaries.

Saint-Broing (French pronunciation: [sɛ̃ bʁwɛ̃]) is a commune in the Haute-Saône department in the region of Bourgogne-Franche-Comté in eastern France.

== See also ==
- Communes of the Haute-Saône department
