= Esmoulins =

- Commune
- Location of Esmoulins
- Location within France Location within Bourgogne-Franche-Comté
- Coordinates: 47°24′20″N 5°34′09″E
- Country: France
- Region: Bourgogne-Franche-Comté
- Department: Haute-Saône
- Arrondissement: Vesoul
- Canton: Gray
- Area^{1}: 4.48 km^{2} (1.73 sq mi)
- Highest elevation: 213 m (699 ft)
- Lowest elevation: 188 m (617 ft)
- Population (2023): 127
  - Density: 28.3/km^{2} (73.4/sq mi)
- Time zone: UTC+01:00 (CET)
  - Summer (DST): UTC+02:00 (CEST)
- INSEE/Postal code: 70218 /70100
- ^{1} French Land Register data, which excludes lakes, ponds, glaciers > 1 km^{2} (0.386 sq mi or 247 acres) and river estuaries.

Esmoulins is a commune in the Haute-Saône department in the region of Bourgogne-Franche-Comté in eastern France.

== See also ==
- Communes of the Haute-Saône department
