= Canton of Gray =

Coordinates: 47.44°N 5.60°E

The canton of Gray is an administrative division of the Haute-Saône department, northeastern France. Its borders were modified at the French canton reorganisation which came into effect in March 2015. Its seat is in Gray.

It consists of the following communes:

1. Ancier
2. Angirey
3. Apremont
4. Arc-lès-Gray
5. Battrans
6. Champtonnay
7. Champvans
8. Cresancey
9. Esmoulins
10. Essertenne-et-Cecey
11. Germigney
12. Gray
13. Gray-la-Ville
14. Igny
15. Mantoche
16. Nantilly
17. Noiron
18. Onay
19. Saint-Broing
20. Saint-Loup-Nantouard
21. Sauvigney-lès-Gray
22. Le Tremblois
23. Velesmes-Échevanne
24. Velet
