= Champvans, Haute-Saône =

Champvans
- Commune
- Location of Champvans
- Location within France Location within Bourgogne-Franche-Comté
- Coordinates: 47°23′40″N 5°34′37″E
- Country: France
- Region: Bourgogne-Franche-Comté
- Department: Haute-Saône
- Arrondissement: Vesoul
- Canton: Gray

Government
  - Mayor (2020–2026): Philippe Lambert
- Area^{1}: 7.15 km^{2} (2.76 sq mi)
- Highest elevation: 246 m (807 ft)
- Lowest elevation: 188 m (617 ft)
- Population (2023): 171
  - Density: 23.9/km^{2} (61.9/sq mi)
- Time zone: UTC+01:00 (CET)
  - Summer (DST): UTC+02:00 (CEST)
- INSEE/Postal code: 70125 /70100
- ^{1} French Land Register data, which excludes lakes, ponds, glaciers > 1 km^{2} (0.386 sq mi or 247 acres) and river estuaries.

Champvans (French pronunciation: [ʃɑ̃vɑ̃]) is a commune in the Haute-Saône department in the region of Bourgogne-Franche-Comté in eastern France.

== See also ==
- Communes of the Haute-Saône department
