= Igny, Haute-Saône =

Igny
- Commune
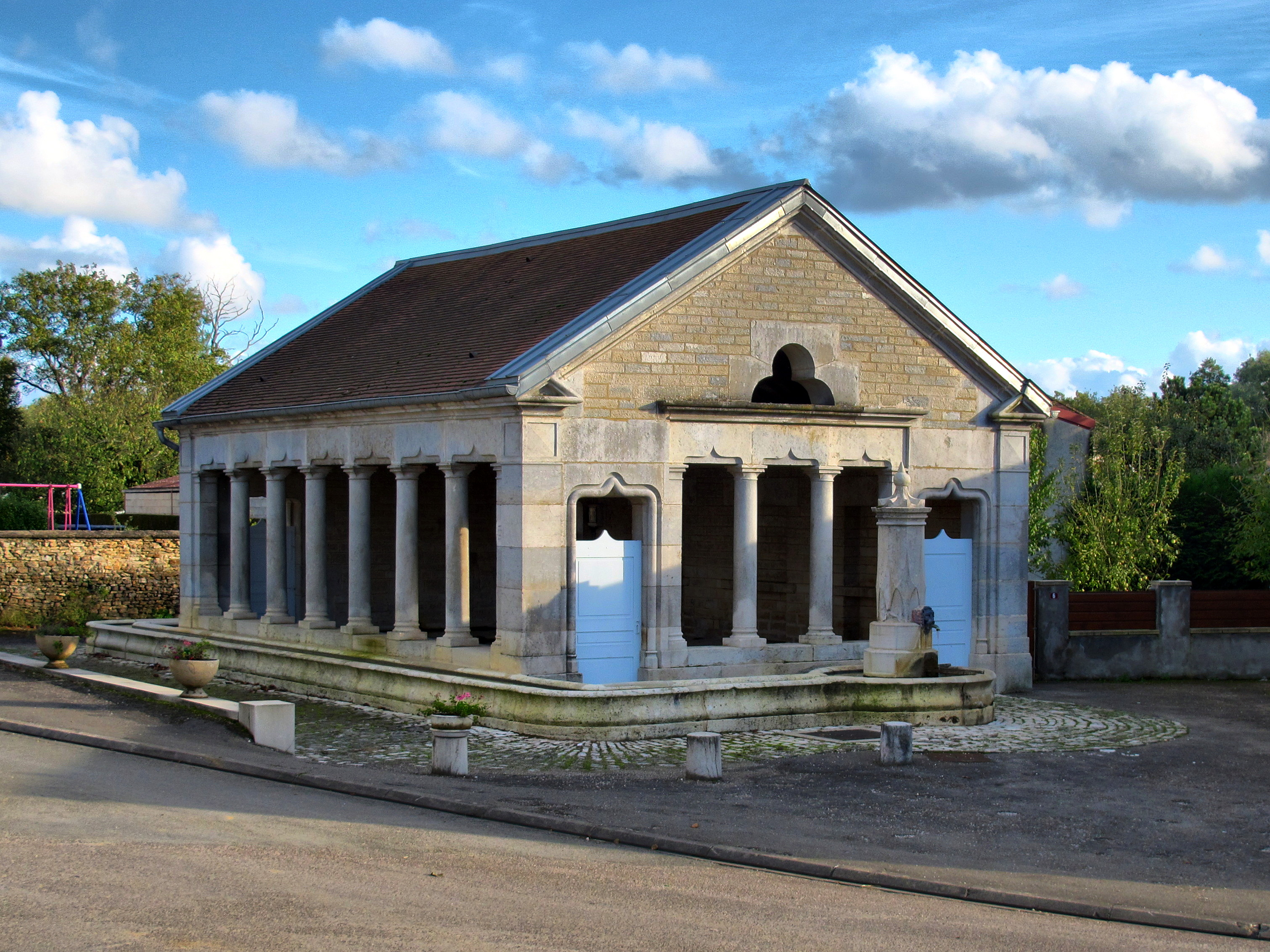
- The grand fountain in Igny

- Coat of arms
- Location of Igny
- Location within France Location within Bourgogne-Franche-Comté
- Coordinates: 47°28′47″N 5°45′46″E
- Country: France
- Region: Bourgogne-Franche-Comté
- Department: Haute-Saône
- Arrondissement: Vesoul
- Canton: Gray

Government
  - Mayor (2020–2026): Marcel Braconnier
- Area^{1}: 10.03 km^{2} (3.87 sq mi)
- Highest elevation: 252 m (827 ft)
- Lowest elevation: 200 m (660 ft)
- Population (2023): 202
  - Density: 20.1/km^{2} (52.2/sq mi)
- Time zone: UTC+01:00 (CET)
  - Summer (DST): UTC+02:00 (CEST)
- INSEE/Postal code: 70289 /70700
- ^{1} French Land Register data, which excludes lakes, ponds, glaciers > 1 km^{2} (0.386 sq mi or 247 acres) and river estuaries.

Igny (French pronunciation: [iɲi]) is a commune in the Haute-Saône department in the region of Bourgogne-Franche-Comté in eastern France.

== See also ==
- Communes of the Haute-Saône department
