= Le Tremblois =

- Commune
- Coat of arms
- Location of Le Tremblois
- Location within France Location within Bourgogne-Franche-Comté
- Coordinates: 47°23′05″N 5°34′42″E
- Country: France
- Region: Bourgogne-Franche-Comté
- Department: Haute-Saône
- Arrondissement: Vesoul
- Canton: Gray

Government
  - Mayor (2020–2026): Jean-Philippe Bonvalot
- Area^{1}: 5.49 km^{2} (2.12 sq mi)
- Highest elevation: 243 m (797 ft)
- Lowest elevation: 197 m (646 ft)
- Population (2023): 159
  - Density: 29.0/km^{2} (75.0/sq mi)
- Time zone: UTC+01:00 (CET)
  - Summer (DST): UTC+02:00 (CEST)
- INSEE/Postal code: 70505 /70100
- ^{1} French Land Register data, which excludes lakes, ponds, glaciers > 1 km^{2} (0.386 sq mi or 247 acres) and river estuaries.

Le Tremblois (French pronunciation: [lə tʁɑ̃blwa]) is a commune in the Haute-Saône department in the region of Bourgogne-Franche-Comté in eastern France.

== See also ==
- Communes of the Haute-Saône department
