= Bouchardon =

Bouchardon is a French surname. Notable people with the surname include:

- Edmé Bouchardon (1698–1762), French sculptor
- Jean-Baptiste Bouchardon (1667–1742), French sculptor and architect
