= Jean-Baptiste Bouchardon =

French architect and sculptor

Jean-Baptiste Bouchardon (16 May 1667 – 15 January 1742) was a 17th/18th-century French sculptor and architect.

== Biography ==
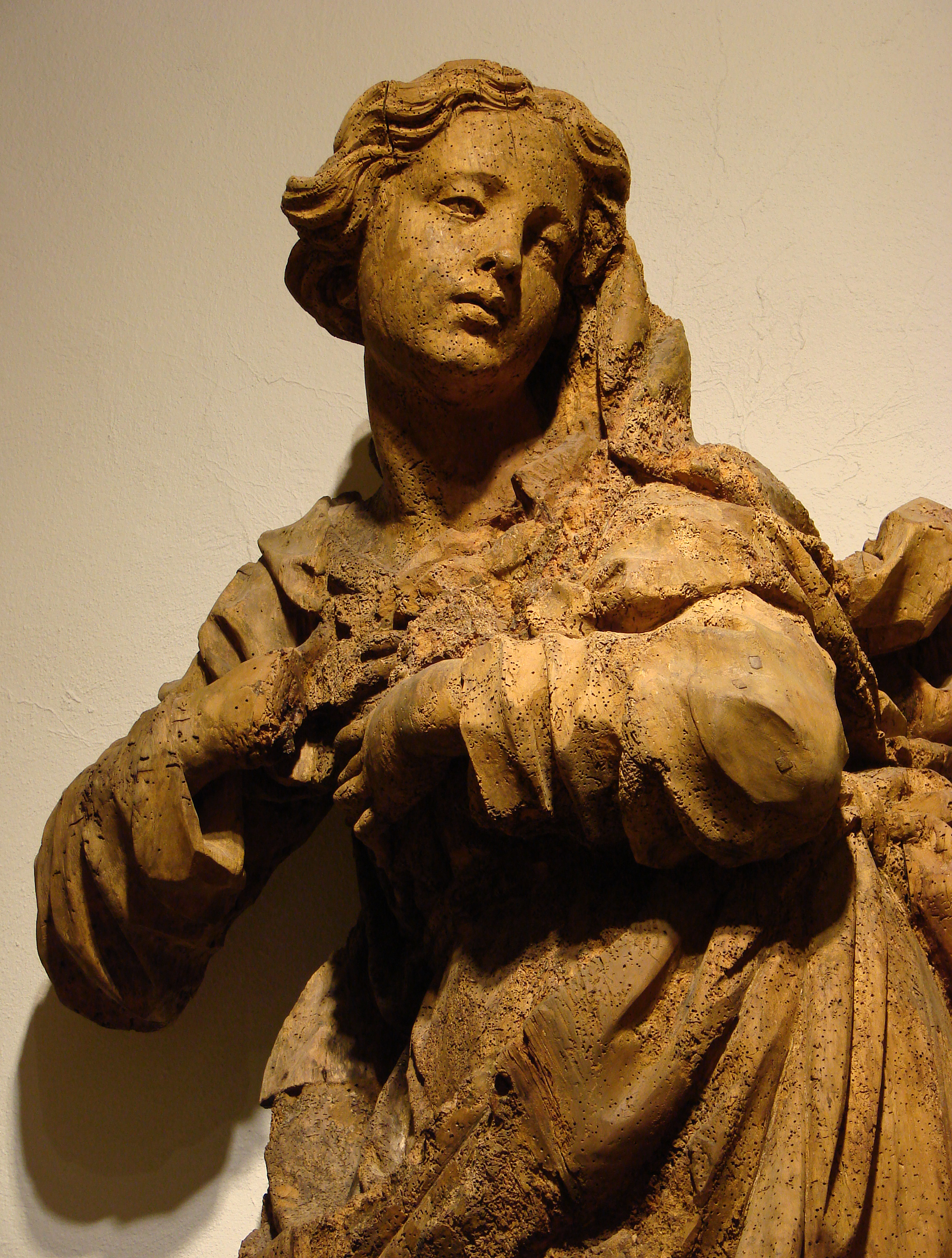
Vierge de l'Assomption, detail, Chaumont, Musée d'art et d'histoire.

Born in Saint-Didier-en-Velay, in the Lyonnais, Bouchardon was the son of the merchant Anthoine Bouchardon and his wife Gabrielle Trinquet.

His father had a good situation in Velay as Jean-Baptiste Bouchardon's godfather and godmother showed. We don't know why he left Velay and how he learned to sculpt. Alphonse Roserot supposes that his father had opposed his son's wish and that he had to leave Velay to satisfy his desire, but Henry Ronot indicates in his book that he trained at the École des beaux-arts de Lyon.

=== Jean-Baptiste Bouchardon in Chaumont ===
On 29 October 1692, he married Anne Cheré (died in July 1737) at Chaumont-en-Bassigny, the daughter of Joachim Cheré (1641–1708), master cobbler, and Anne Jacquin (..-1712). Guiète Cheré, Anne Chéré's brother, was a sculptor at Chaumont.

He probably arrived a few years before 1692 in Chaumont-en-Bassigny to settle in the city comfortably enough to marry there. There are no documents left to specify this date. Alphonse Roserot proposes the date 1690. The young spouses settled in a house that was given to them and where the couple's sixteen children were born. Of these, three were sculptors: the older, Edmé Bouchardon (1698–1762), Jacques-Philippe Bouchardon (1711- Stockholm 1753), who made a career in Sweden as the first sculptor of the Swedish king, and Jacquette Bouchardon who took over the paternal workshop.

Jacquette Bouchardon worked young in his father's workshop for the gilding of altarpieces, bas-reliefs and statues. Edmé Bouchardon worked with his father in 1715 at the earliest, before he joined the workshop of Coustou the elder in 1721. Jacques Bouchardon began sculpting with his father only in 1726, but left the studio in 1730 to become a soldier, but three years later he asked for the family's support to free himself from this service. His brother Edmé on his return from Rome, stayed in his Parisian apartment from 1734 to 1737/1739. It was probably through the Count of Caylus, Edmé's protector, and Edmé himself who had made several trips to Sweden, that Jacques-Philippe Bouchardon was recruited to come and work in Sweden from 1741.

In a letter dated 31 July 1737, from Jean-Baptiste Bouchardon to his son Edmé, after his wife died, he wrote that for a long time they had been very poor.

He died in his home, rue Chaude in Chaumont, aged 74 on 15 January 1742. He had made his will on 27 décembre 1741.

=== Jean-Baptiste Bouchardon as wood-carver ===
The first mention of one of his works dates from 1698 for a tabernacle with altarpiece, carved and gilded wood, intended for the church of Saint-Urbain. He has mainly created works for churches in Marne, Haute-Marne, Aube and Côte-d'Or knin carved wood: Roôcourt-la-Côte (1717–1719) paid 312 livres, Saint-Urbain (1697), paid 400 livres, Reclancourt (1735–1738) paid 600 livres, Ceffonds (1733) paid 1200 livres, Cirfontaines-en-Azois (1734), 700 livres, Mussey (c. 1703), 1,000 livres, Landreville (1716), 1,000 livres, Neuville-sur-Seine (1729), 1,150 livres, Saint-Pierre de Bar-sur-Aube church (1733–1736), 1,500 livres, moved to Saint-Maclou church. Around 1700, he built the work bench, the pulpit to preach and the former high altar of the Saint-Jean-Baptiste de Chaumont Basilica.

Jean-Baptiste Bouchardon made wooden copies of two statues of his son for the église Saint-Sulpice of Paris: Christ leaned on the Cross and Virgin of sorrow. These two wooden statues had been made by the Longuay abbey and subsequently deposited in the Saint-Jean-Baptiste de Chaumont basilica. They were still in Jean-Baptiste Bouchardon's studio when he died but in the Longuay abbey in 1744. They were deposited in the Chaumont museum during the French Revolution before being housed in the Saint-Jean-Baptiste de Chaumont basilica.

=== Stone sculptures ===
In 1703, he sculpted in stone from Tonnerre the statues of Saint Peter and Paul the Apostle for the Saint-Pierre-ès-Liens de Riceys-Bas church. In 1709 he had sculpted the mausoleum of Jean Lenet, abbott of Notre-Dame de Châtillon abbey, in the Saint Anne chapel of the abbey church, at Châtillon-sur-Seine, now missing.

If for reasons of economy, Jean-Baptiste Bouchardon often carved in wood, he made stone sculptures for the altar of the convent church of the Ursulines of Chaumont in 1712, whose design is still preserved. The different elements exist but have been dispersed in different buildings. The whole was paid 13,400 livres.

Between 1716 and 1720, together with his son Edmé, he created the sculptures for the portal of the Saint-Étienne de Dijon abbey. The sculptures disappeared from the church and the bas-relief of the martyrdom of St. Stephen was moved above the portal of the Saint-Bénigne Cathedral.

In Dijon, he also signed a contract in 1718 with the Ursulines for two oak wooden altars for two new chapels in their church. The contract was also signed by François Dussaussoy, "master sculptor in Dijon", who had been a Bouchardon worker. Bouchardon committed himself to carving in stone the representations of Saint Augustine and Saint Joseph. He also executed two medallions. This work was paid for in 1725.

In 1719, he made the mausoleums of Councillor Jehannin located in the Saint-Michel de Dijon church. In 1721, he signed the contract for the mausoleum of the Marquis of Rennepont for the church of Roches-Bettaincourt, now missing.

Between 1732 and 1737, there was an exchange of 16 letters between Bouchardon and the Marquis d'Orménans concerning statues and busts that the Marquis had commissioned from the sculptor for his castle of Loulans. The Marquis complains about the slowness of construction and the quality of the stones. Bouchardon tired of the Marquis' complaints tried to have this contract cancelled. But the statues placed outside did not resist the frost. The last two statues were delivered to the Marquis in 1745 by Jacquette Bouchardon.

For Joseph-Bernard Soyrot (1650–1730), he had executed busts placed on consoles in his house in Châtillon-sur-Seine. Those busts are gone.

=== Jean-Baptiste Bouchardon as architect ===
As early as 1700, Jean-Baptiste Bouchardon had taken the title of architect. He is quoted in 1718 as the city's architect and seems to have remained so until his death. His successor, Claude Legros, was not mentioned for the first time until 13 April 1742. He modified one side of the town hall square. He has most often made repairs and his works are minor: porch of the abbey church Notre-Dame de Châtillon abbey, in 1708, entrance door of the abbey of Val-des-Écoliers, in 1713, porticoed lodge, sort of greenhouse, of the castle of Chamarandes, near Chaumont, in 1736.

In 1734, he designed a project for a royal square called the Triomphe de la paix ("Triumph of Peace") composed of two concentric building belts, the one inside is quadrilobal, the other outside is polygonal and houses an economic, commercial and fiscal centre. This type of project was original and was intended for Paris to accommodate the administrative hotels of the fermiers généraux.

== Public collections ==
- Chaumont, Musée d'art et d'histoire de Chaumont:
  - Projet d'élévation de la façade d'un hôpital et d'une manufacture, 1716, pencil and watercolour
  - Projet pour le monument funéraire de Claude-François Gehannin, 1719, drawing
  - Plan du rez-de-chaussée de la maison de Monsieur Mongin d'Albigny, prévôt de Chaumont, 1731, drawing
  - Projet d'une chaire à prêcher, 1733, drawing
  - Vierge de l'Assomption, wood
- Chaumont, chapelle des Jésuites: high relief
- Dijon, musée des beaux-arts de Dijon:
  - Projet pour la façade de l'église Église Saint-Étienne de Dijon, 1716, pen and ink wash on paper
  - Projet de plan et élévation pour la façade de l'église Saint-Etienne de Dijon, 1717, pen and grey wash on paper
  - Projet de piédestal pour la statue équestre de Louis XIV sur la place royale de Dijon, 1724, pen and grey wash on paper
- Dijon, musée d'art sacré de Dijon: one sculpture.

== Some pupils ==
- Edmé Bouchardon
- Jacques-Philippe Bouchardon
- Jacquette Bouchardon

== Family ==
From the marriage of Jean-Baptiste Bouchardon and Anne Chéré 16 children were born:

- Jacquette Bouchardon, (29 September 1694 – 16 June 1756), unmarried
- Marguerite Bouchardon, (4 November 1696 – infant death)
- Edme Bouchardon, né le 29 mai 1698, mort le 27 juillet 1742 à Paris
- Arnoult Bouchardon, (born 7 August 1699 – died in Holland
- Jean-François Bouchardon, (22 October 1700 – infant death)
- Anne Bouchardon, (22 September 1702 – 1 April 1719)
- Jean-Baptiste Bouchardon, (born 1 April 1705), militaire
- Joseph-Antoine Bouchardon, (11 April 1706 – 20 September 1720), at Ortes, Holland
- Nicolas Bouchardon, (born 7 July 1707 – died young)
- Marie ou Anne-Marie, (17 July 1708, atteinte d'aliénation mentale et enfermée dans un couvent – 27 December 1787)
- André Bouchardon, (born 7 November 1709 – died young)
- Jacques-Philippe Bouchardon, (1 May 1711, premier sculpteur du roi de Suède – 19 December 1753) in Stockholm
- Marie-Anne ou Marianne Bouchardon, (9 April 1712 – died young)
- Nicole-Catherine Bouchardon, (22 October 1713, married to Hugues I Voillemier on 24 October 1741 – 20 Octobre 1749). From this marriage were born the only descendants of the Bouchardon family
- Marie-Thérèse Bouchardon, (23 September 1715, married to François Girard in 1742 – 1 February 1783). Two children were born, but without posterity
- Anne-Marie Bouchardon, (born 26 July 1720, died young).

== Bibliography ==
- Alphonse Roserot, Jean-Baptiste Bouchardon, sculpteur et architecte à Chaumont en Bassigny, Éditions Plon-Nourrit, 1894, 64 pages
- Alphonse Roserot, Jean-Baptiste Bouchardon, sculpteur et architecte à Chaumont en Bassigny (1667-1742), p. 223-282, Réunion des sociétés savantes des départements à la Sorbonne. Section des beaux-arts, Ministère de l'instruction publique, 1894, 18th session Read online
- Henry Ronot, Jean-Baptiste Bouchardon. Architecte et Sculpteur, Éditions Faton, Dijon, 2002, 2. vol., ISBN 978-2-87844-052-2
- Alexandre Cojannot, Compte-rendu de : Henry Ronot, Jean-Baptiste Bouchardon, architecte et sculpteur, ... with collab. by S. Darroussat and V. Noël, Éditions Faton, Paris, 2002, p. 324-325 Bulletin Monumental, 2004, Volume 162, No 4 (Read online)
- Yvonne Rickert, Edme Bouchardon : réseau familial d’un sculpteur originaire de Chaumont, Bulletin du Centre de recherche du château de Versailles (Read online)
- Marie-Agnès Sonnier, Les retables de Jean-Baptiste Bouchardon : Aube et Haute-Marne, Dominique Guéniot publisher (series Itinéraires du patrimoine), Langres, 2005
