= Claude-Jean Allouez =

French Jesuit missionary and explorer

The Reverend Claude-Jean Allouez SJ

Personal life
- Born: June 6, 1622 Saint-Didier-en-Velay, France
- Died: August 28, 1689 (aged 67) Near Niles, Michigan
- Known for: Missionary who founded several missions, including Saint Francis Xavier Mission, Wisconsin

Religious life
- Religion: Roman Catholicism
- Order: Jesuit missionary

Senior posting
- Previous post: Vicar general of the diocese of Quebec

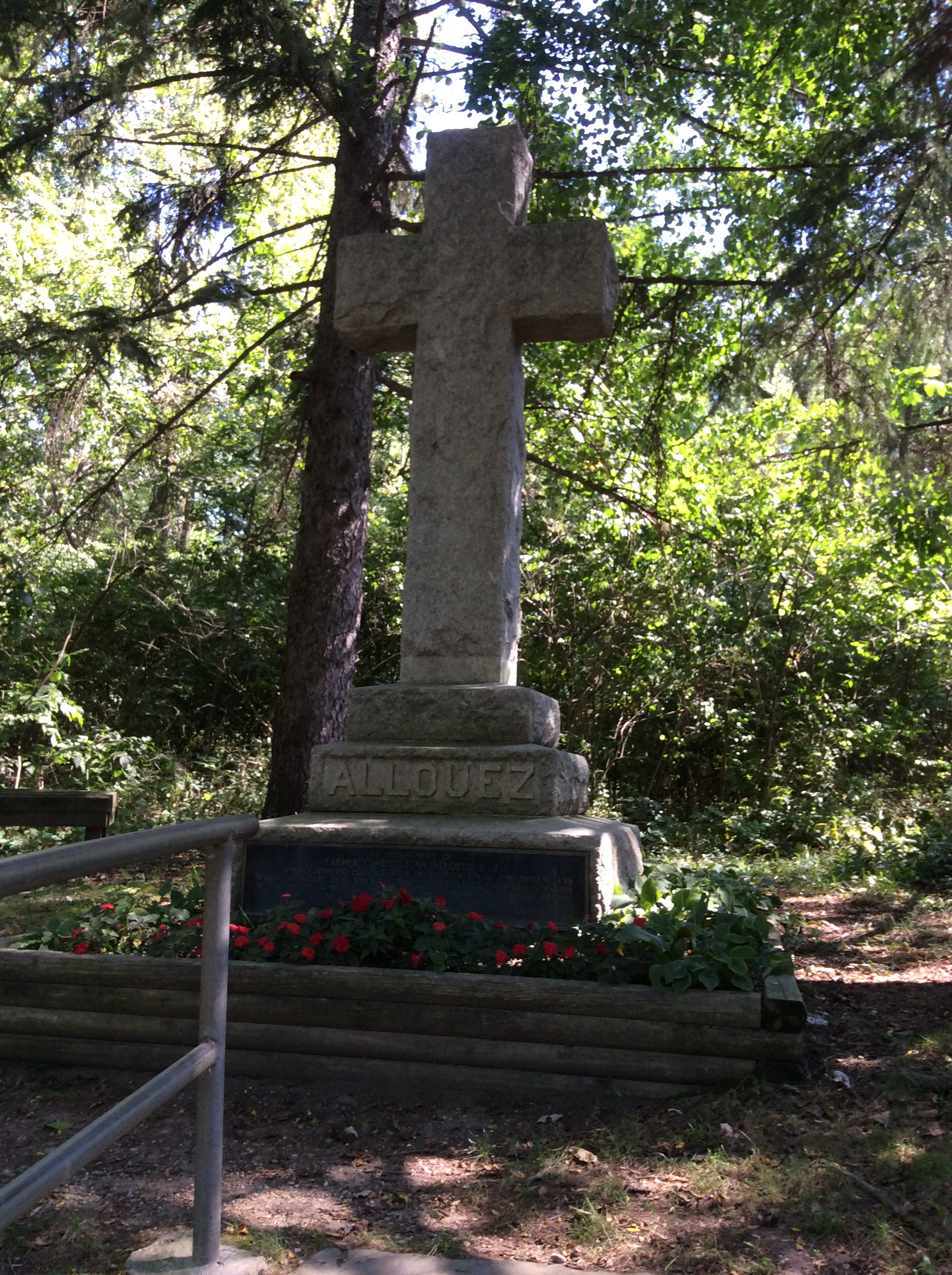
Memorial in Niles, Michigan

Claude Jean Allouez, SJ (June 6, 1622 – August 28, 1689) was a Jesuit missionary and French explorer of North America. He established a number of missions among the indigenous people living near Lake Superior.

== Biography ==
Allouez was born in Saint-Didier-en-Velay in the département of Haute-Loire in south-central France. In 1639, he graduated from the College of Le Puy, and became a Jesuit novice in Toulouse, France. In 1655, he was ordained a priest of the Roman Catholic Church. Allouez arrived in Quebec in 1658 and immediately began a study of the Wyandot and Anishinaabe languages to prepare himself for work as a missionary among the American Indian tribes along the St. Lawrence River.

In 1660 he became the superior of the mission at Trois-Rivières, Quebec. His stay there lasted until 1663 when he was named vicar general of a part of the diocese of Quebec that is now the central region of the United States. This appointment was made by Bishop François de Laval, the first bishop of New France.

From 1665 through 1669 Allouez made a missionary tour of the western missions. In 1667 he visited the village of the Nipissing Indians who had fled there during the Iroquois onslaught of 1649-50 and celebrated the first mass beside the Nipigon River May 29, 1667. He went back to Quebec in search of assistants, and immediately returned to the missions.

On December 3, 1669, Allouez said the first Mass in Oconto, Wisconsin. He served as a missionary to the Potawatomi. The Menominee began participating in the fur trade network and converting to Christianity. The next year he was with the Meskwaki, establishing St. Mark's Mission, and founding the mission of St. James among the Miami and Mascouten peoples, finally returning to Green Bay later that year.

Because of his fluency in native languages and the prestige in which he was held by the Indian nations, in Sault Ste. Marie, Michigan, he was a principal speaker at the ceremony that formally declared the Great Lakes and the Mississippi River valley as territory of the King of France. In 1671 he founded the Saint Francis Xavier Mission at the last set of rapids on the Fox River before entering Green Bay. The site was known as Rapides Des Pères (rapids of the fathers) which became modern day De Pere, Wisconsin. This became his base until word arrived of the death of Jacques Marquette, and Allouez was assigned to continue Marquette's work among the Illinois. In February 1676, on his way to Lake Michigan, his companions rigged a sail on the canoe to sail over the ice. By March he was at Whitefish Bay and reached Kaskaskia by the end of the month.

He continued Marquette's evangelizing of the Indians until his death in 1689, near what is today Niles, Michigan just north of South Bend, Indiana. He is buried in Niles.

A good portion of Father Allouez's written work from the time has been preserved. It provides insight into the missions of the time and provides a record that is extensive and important of the Catholic Church in mid-America. It also contains the first documented accounts of the Illinois Indians. He is reputed to have baptized around 10,000 neophytes.

== Legacy ==
- The village of Allouez, Wisconsin, near Green Bay
- Allouez Trail on Mackinac Island in Northern Michigan
- Claude Allouez Bridge over the Fox River in De Pere, Wisconsin
- Allouez Bay near the mouth of the St. Louis River in Superior, Wisconsin
- Allouez neighborhood of Superior, Wisconsin, situated on Allouez Bay
- Allouez Township in Keweenaw County, Michigan
- The unincorporated community of Allouez in Allouez Township, Michigan
- Allouez Amber Ale by Earth Rider Brewery in Superior, WI
- Father Allouez School in Allouez, WI

== Notes ==
- Ronny Baier (2003). "Claude Jean Allouez". In Bautz, Traugott (ed.). Biographisch-Bibliographisches Kirchenlexikon (BBKL) (in German). Vol. 21. Nordhausen: Bautz. cols. 17–21. ISBN 3-88309-110-3.
