= Musée d'art sacré de Dijon =

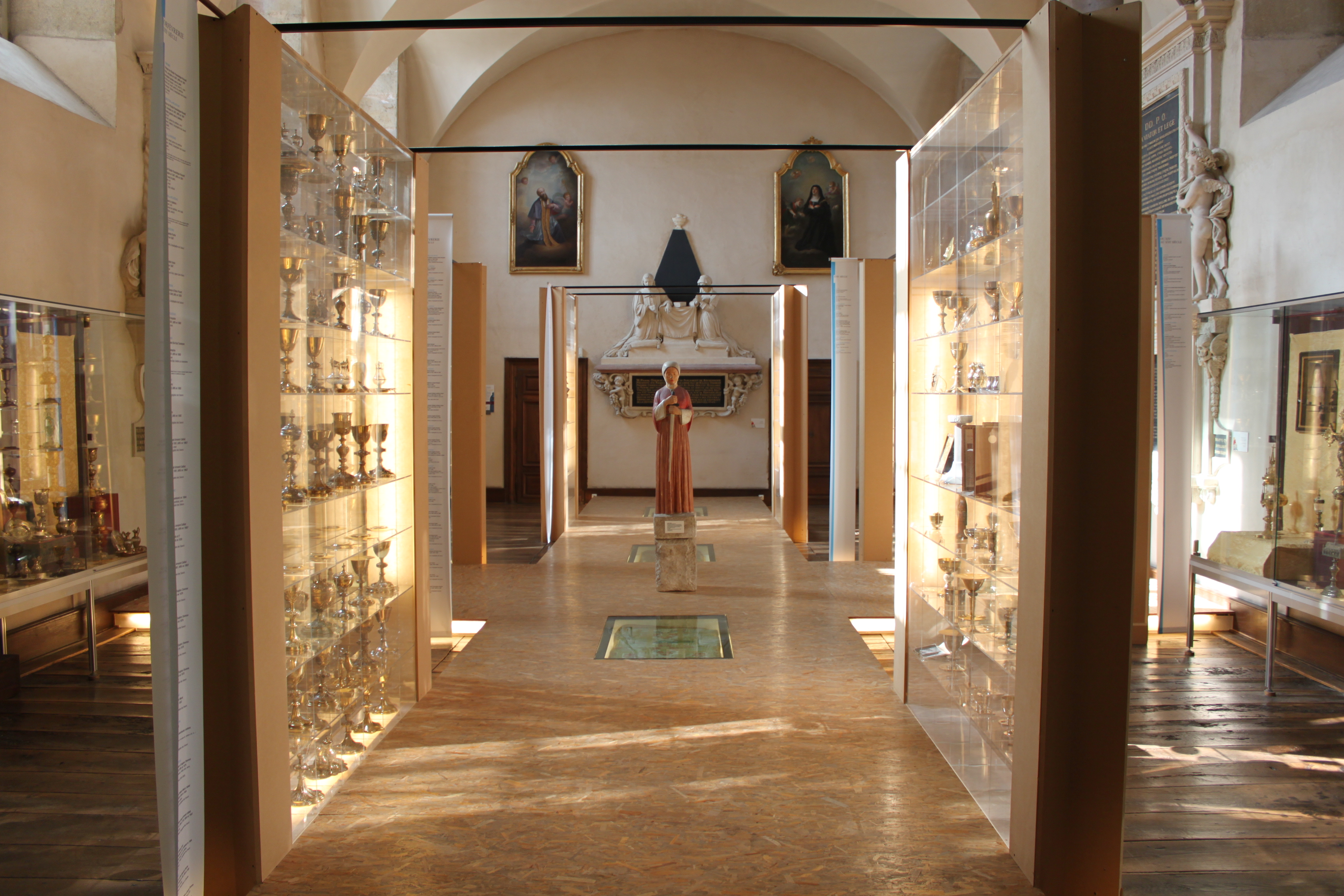
- Musée d'art sacré de Dijon, in the Église Sainte-Anne
- Established: 1979
- Location: 17 rue Sainte-Anne; 21000 Dijon, France
- Coordinates: 47.317729°N 5.038121°E
- Type: Art museum : Catholic Burgundian sacred art

The Musée d'art sacré de Dijon is a municipal museum of Catholic Burgundian sacred art inaugurated in 1980 by Canon Jean Marilier in the Église Sainte-Anne of Dijon. It is labeled "Musée de France" and was associated in 1993 with the Musée de la Vie Bourguignonne Perrin Puycousin located in the nearby monastery. In 1950, the city of Dijon bought the Église Sainte-Anne located at the 17 rue Sainte-Anne to house the museum in 1979. It exhibits sculptures, paintings, furniture, objects of Catholic worship and many relics, which the Church abandoned their use in various religious reforms. In the grandstands there is a large collection of religious clothing, mainly of the 19th and 20th centuries. The museum gathers liturgical objects of the 12th to the 19th century used for Catholic worship, and shows the lives of communities of women belonging to various spiritual families. There are many works by Jean-Baptiste Bouchardon.

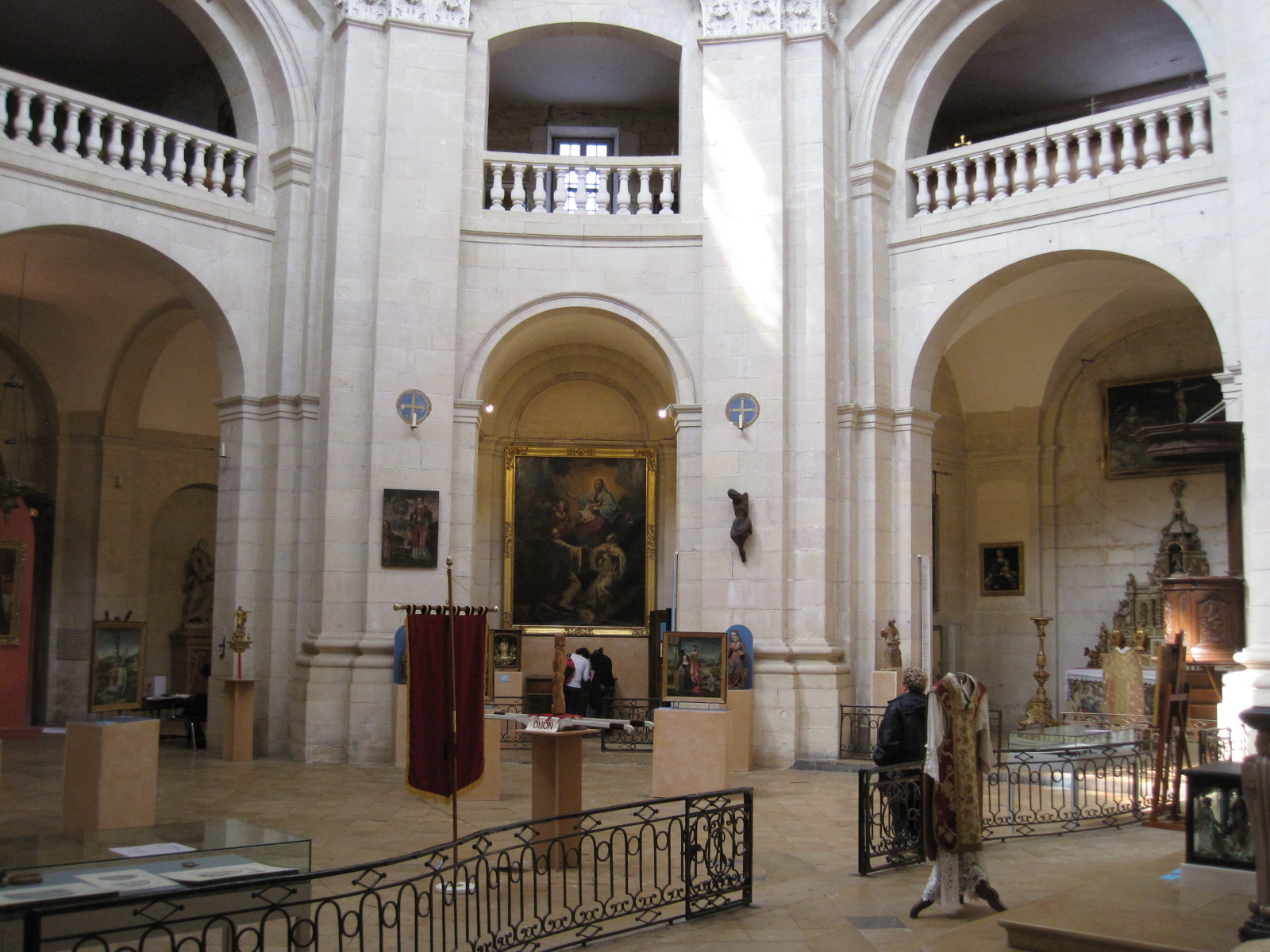

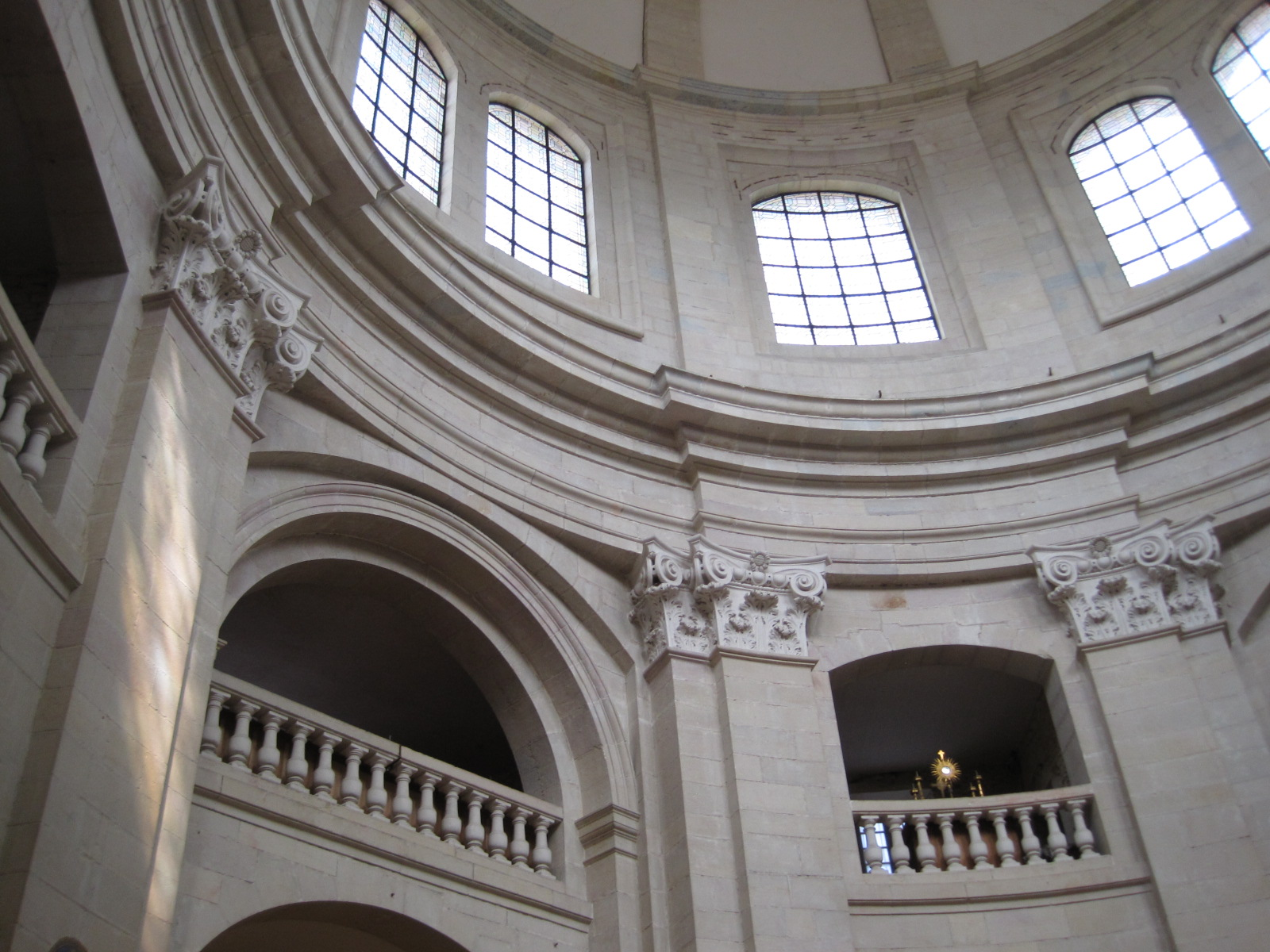

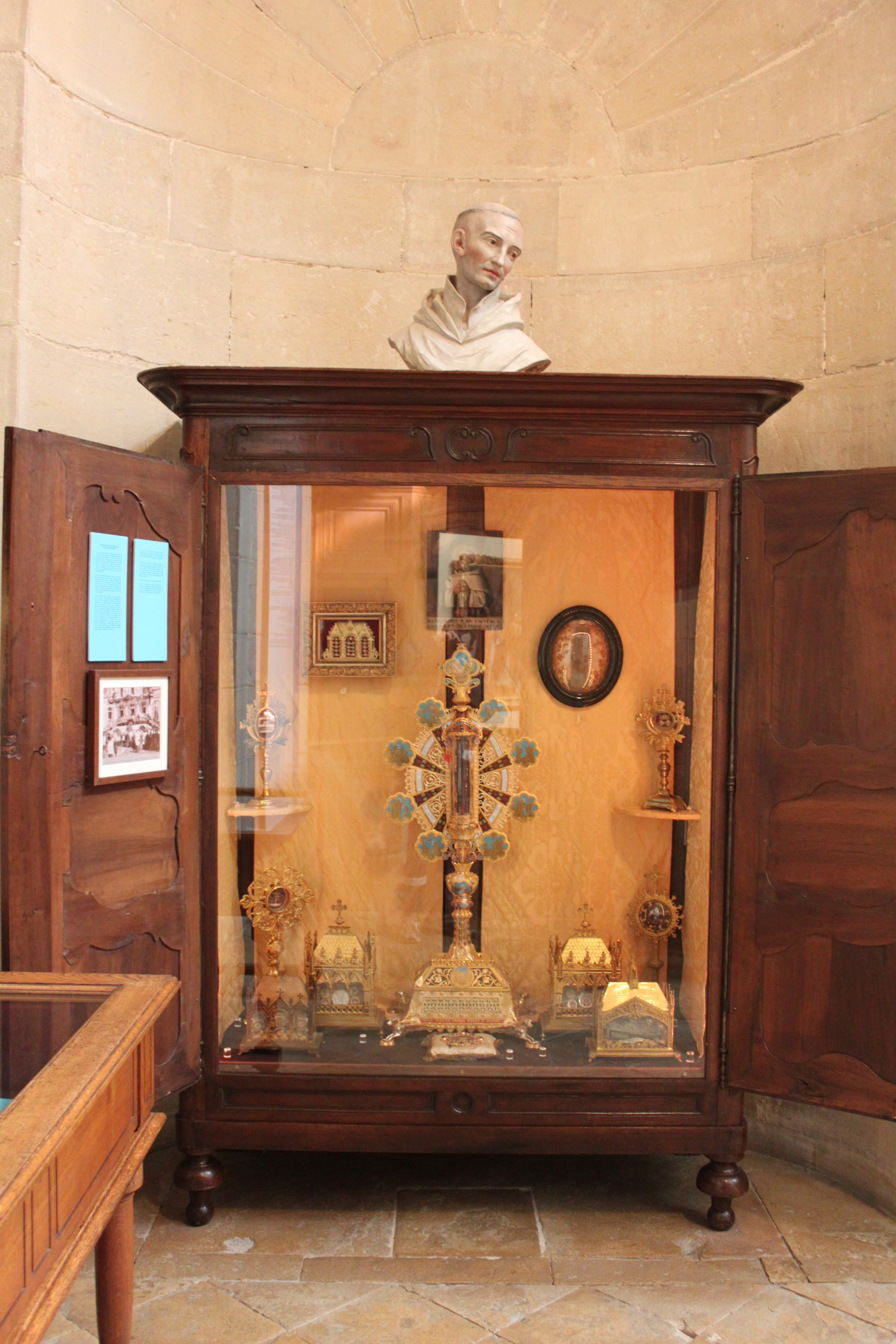

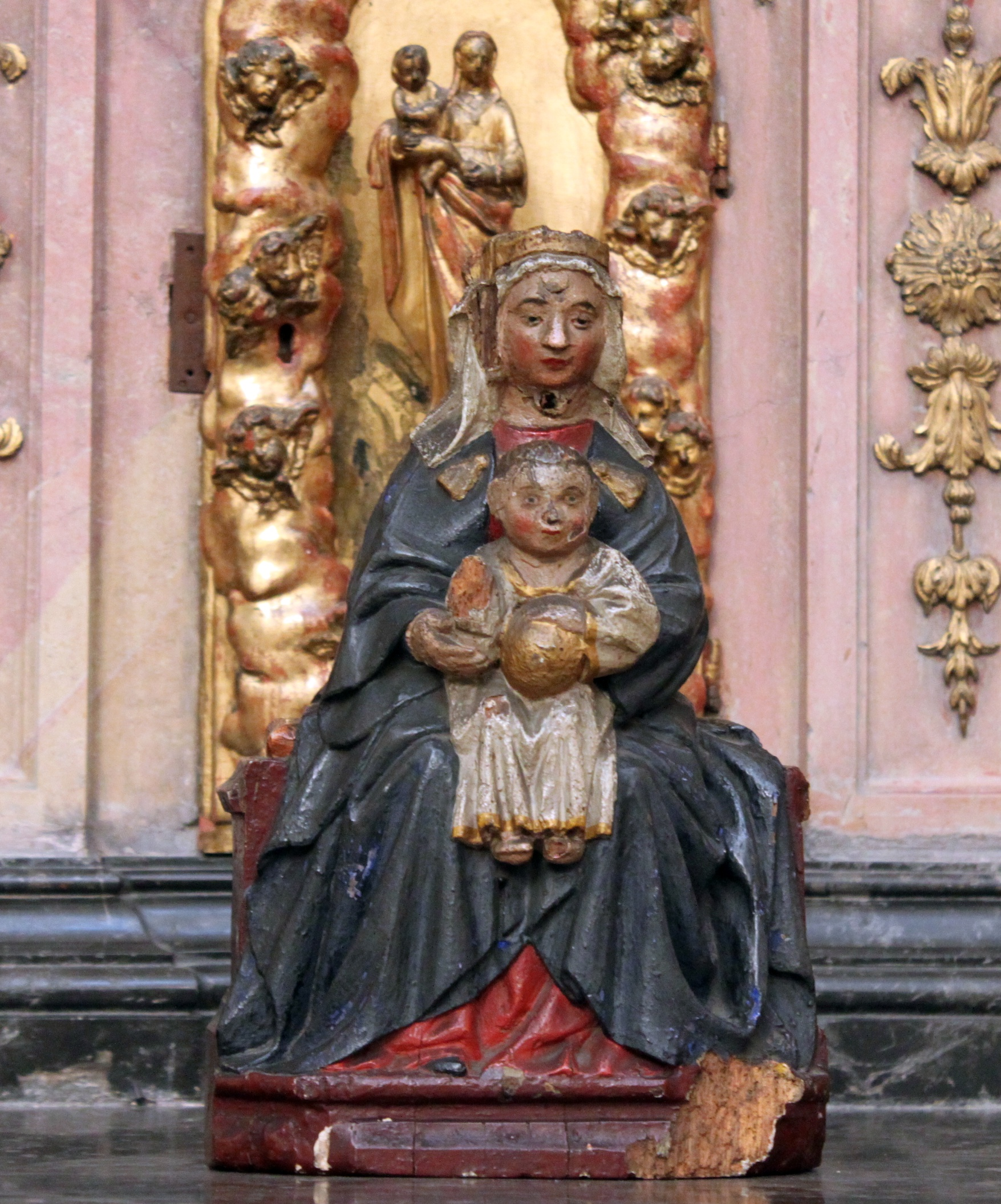

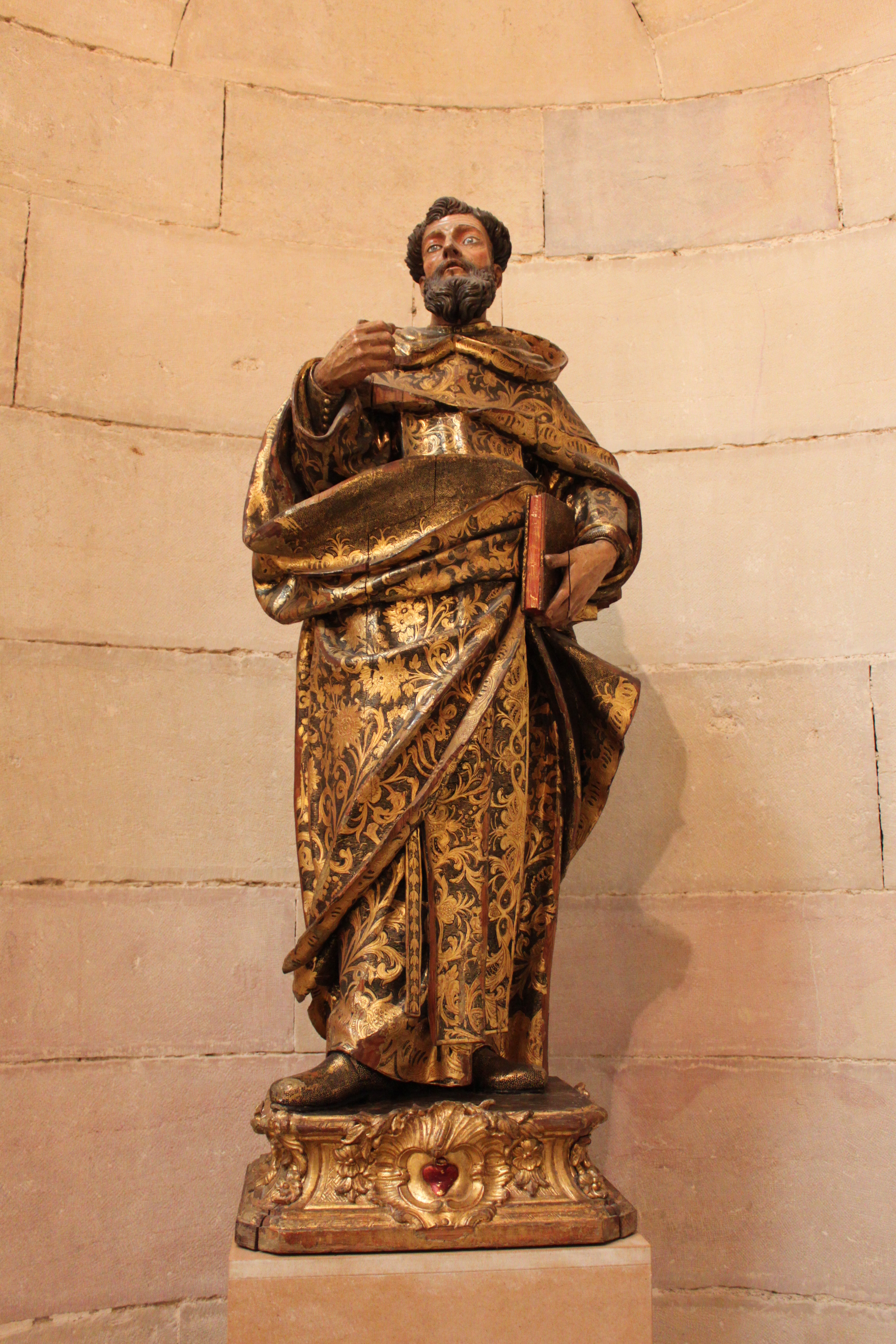

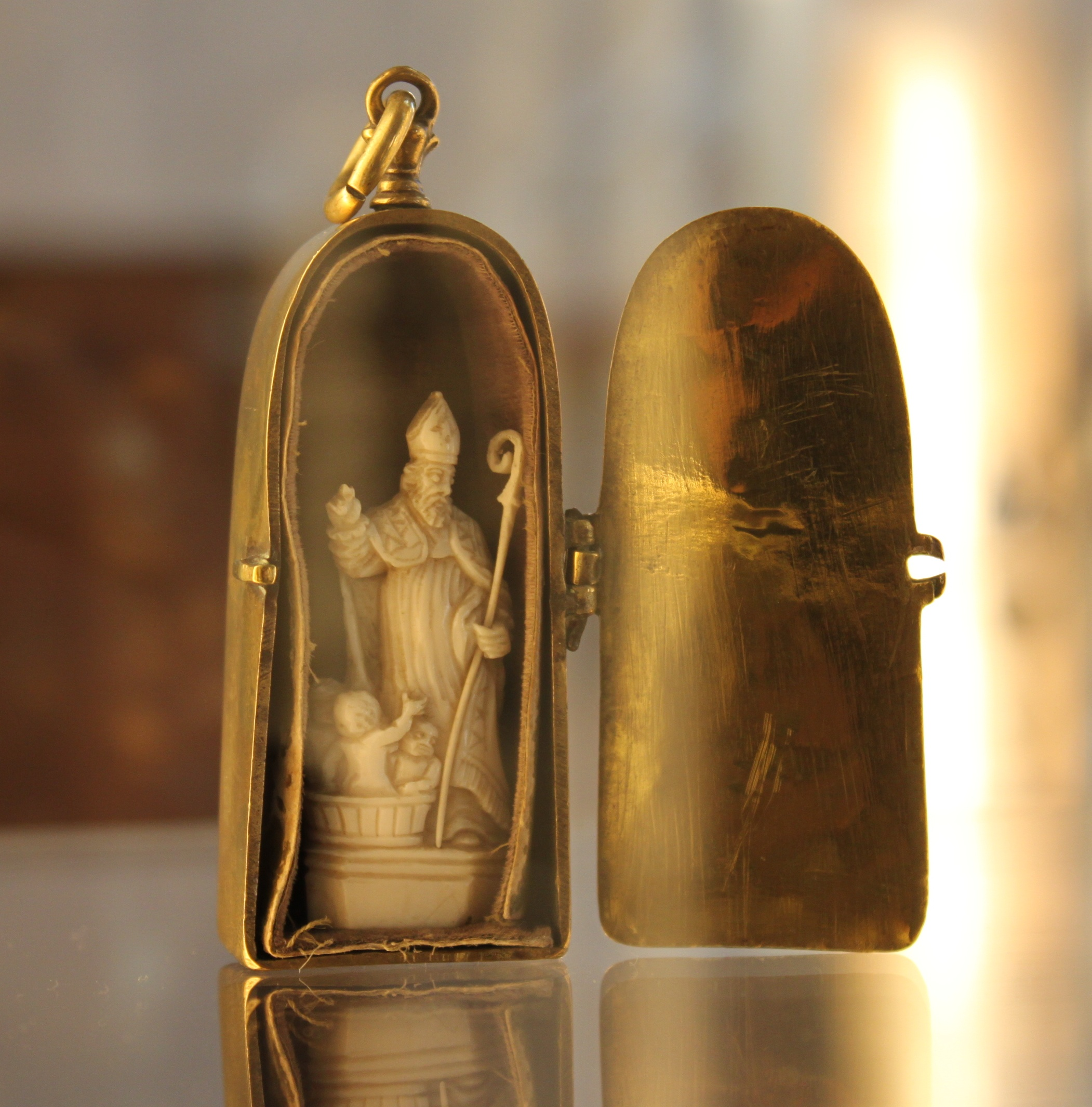
