= Saint-Didier-en-Velay =

- Commune
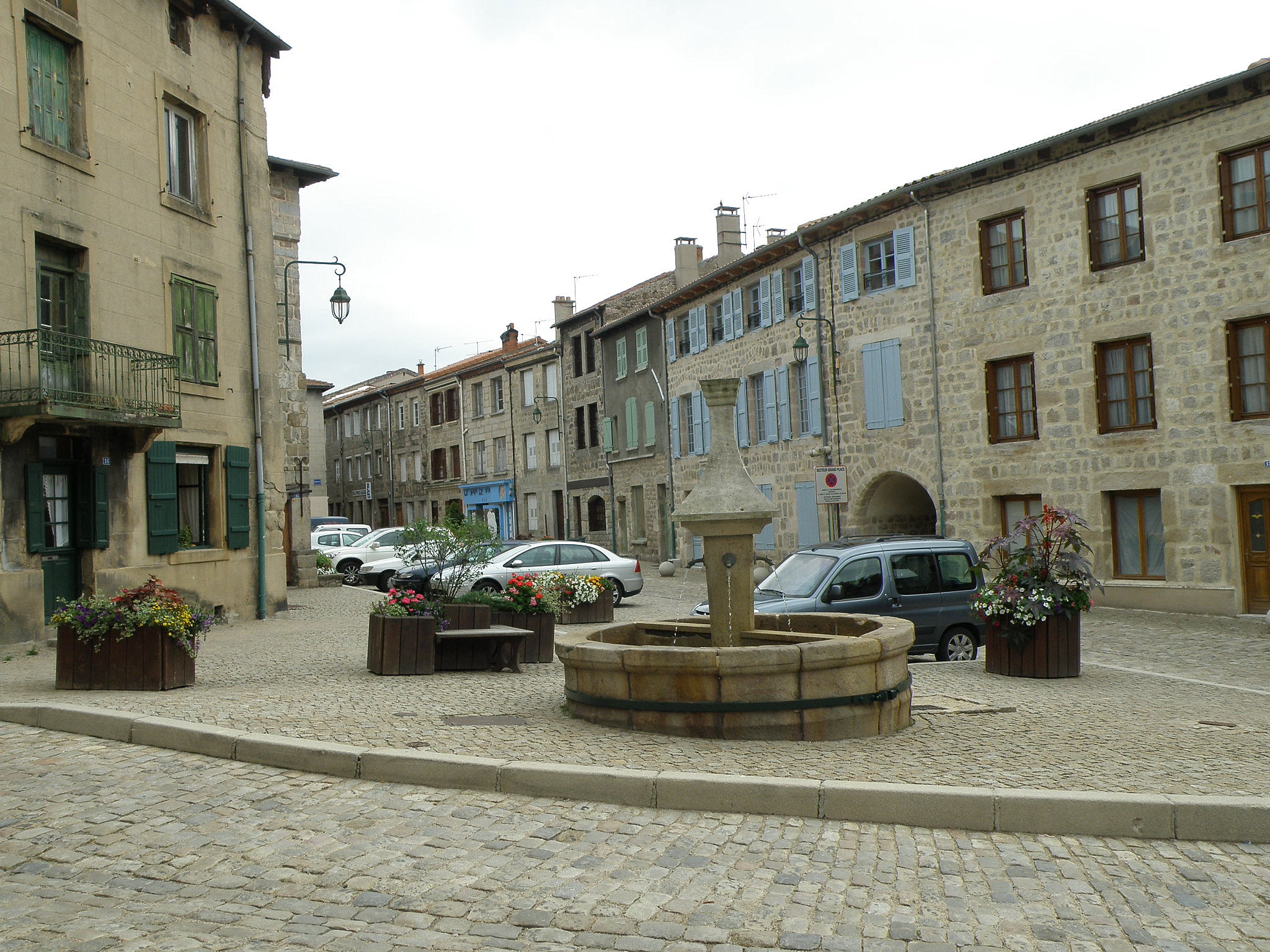

- Coat of arms
- Location of Saint-Didier-en-Velay
- Location within France Location within Auvergne-Rhône-Alpes
- Coordinates: 45°18′08″N 4°16′30″E
- Country: France
- Region: Auvergne-Rhône-Alpes
- Department: Haute-Loire
- Arrondissement: Yssingeaux
- Canton: Deux Rivières et Vallées
- Intercommunality: Loire-Semène

Government
  - Mayor (2020–2026): Emmanuel Salgado
- Area^{1}: 25.56 km^{2} (9.87 sq mi)
- Elevation: 835 m (2,740 ft)
- Highest elevation: 924 m (3,031 ft)
- Lowest elevation: 640 m (2,100 ft)
- Population (2023): 3,523
  - Density: 137.8/km^{2} (357.0/sq mi)
- Time zone: UTC+01:00 (CET)
  - Summer (DST): UTC+02:00 (CEST)
- INSEE/Postal code: 43177 /43140
- ^{1} French Land Register data, which excludes lakes, ponds, glaciers > 1 km^{2} (0.386 sq mi or 247 acres) and river estuaries.

Saint-Didier-en-Velay (French pronunciation: [sɛ̃ didje ɑ̃ vəlɛ], literally Saint-Didier in Velay; Occitan: Sant Desdèir de La Seuva) is a commune in the Haute-Loire department in south-central France.

== Population ==
Historical population

Year	Pop.	±% p.a.
1793	3,203	—
1821	3,540	+0.36%
1846	4,045	+0.53%
1872	4,743	+0.61%
1901	5,891	+0.75%
1926	3,087	−2.55%
1946	2,586	−0.88%
1962	2,603	+0.04%
1968	2,555	−0.31%

Year	Pop.	±% p.a.
1975	2,422	−0.76%
1982	2,580	+0.91%
1990	2,723	+0.68%
1999	2,891	+0.67%
2007	3,302	+1.68%
2012	3,476	+1.03%
2017	3,403	−0.42%
2023	3,523	+0.58%

Source: EHESS and INSEE (1968-2023)

== Sights ==
In the church of Saint Didier, there is an impressive Spanish Baroque painting of Mary Magdalene which has been attributed to Murillo or Zurbarán. It is most likely a 17th century copy of a painting by Murillo.

== Personalities ==
- Claude-Jean Allouez
- Jean-Baptiste Bouchardon (1667–1742), sculptor and architect

== See also ==
- Communes of the Haute-Loire department
