= Saint Francis Xavier Mission (De Pere, Wisconsin) =

Jesuit mission in Wisconsin

Coordinates: 44°26′56″N 88°03′42″W

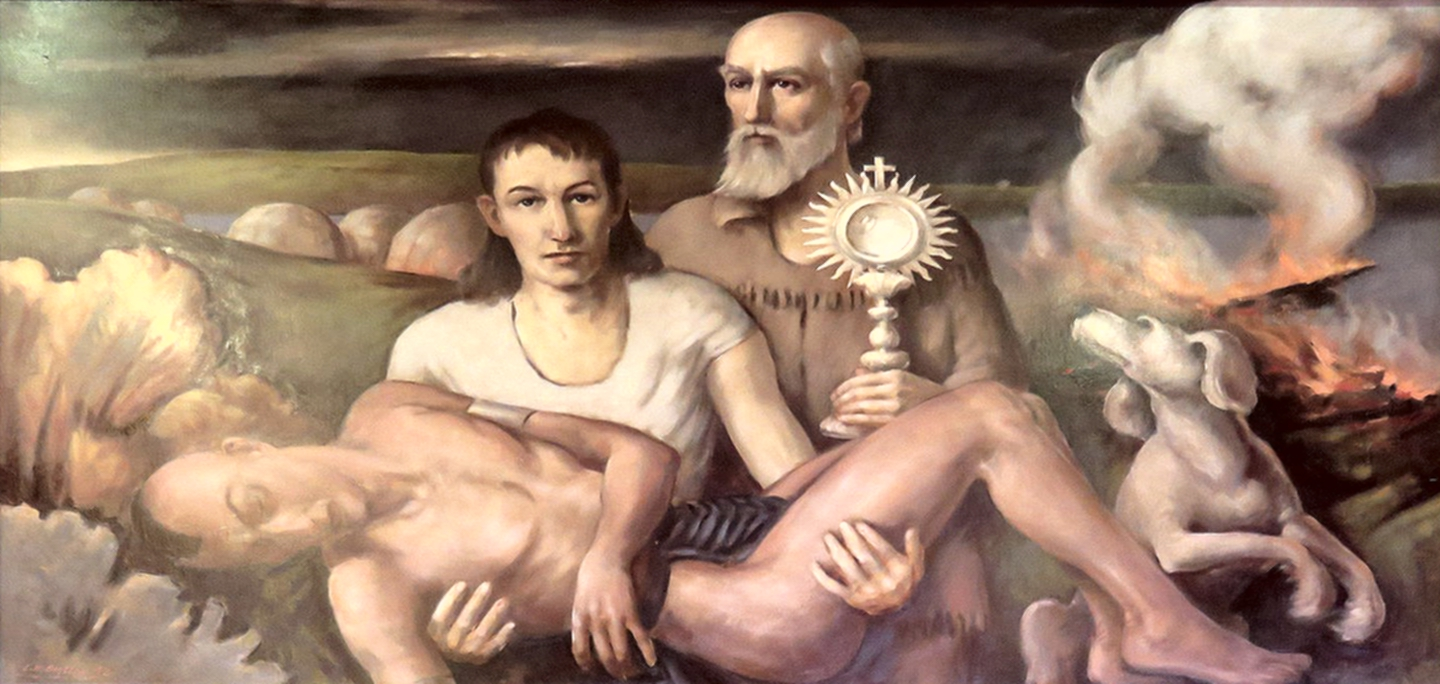
The Red Pieta, by Lester W. Bentley, 1942

The mission of St. Francis Xavier was a seventeenth-century Jesuit mission located on the rapids of the Fox River near De Pere, Wisconsin.

It was founded in 1671 by Claude Allouez to proselytize the native peoples of the western Great Lakes. In 1684 a chapel measuring 70'x40' and seating six-hundred was completed under the direction of Father Verboort to serve an expanding Catholic population. The mission was used as a base of operations by Nicolas Perrot in his explorations of the Upper Midwest in the 1680s. In 1686 he made a present of a silver ostensorium to the mission which was rediscovered by workmen digging a foundation in 1802. In 1687 the mission of St. Francis Xavier was destroyed in an Iroquois attack.
