= Loulans-Verchamp =

- Commune
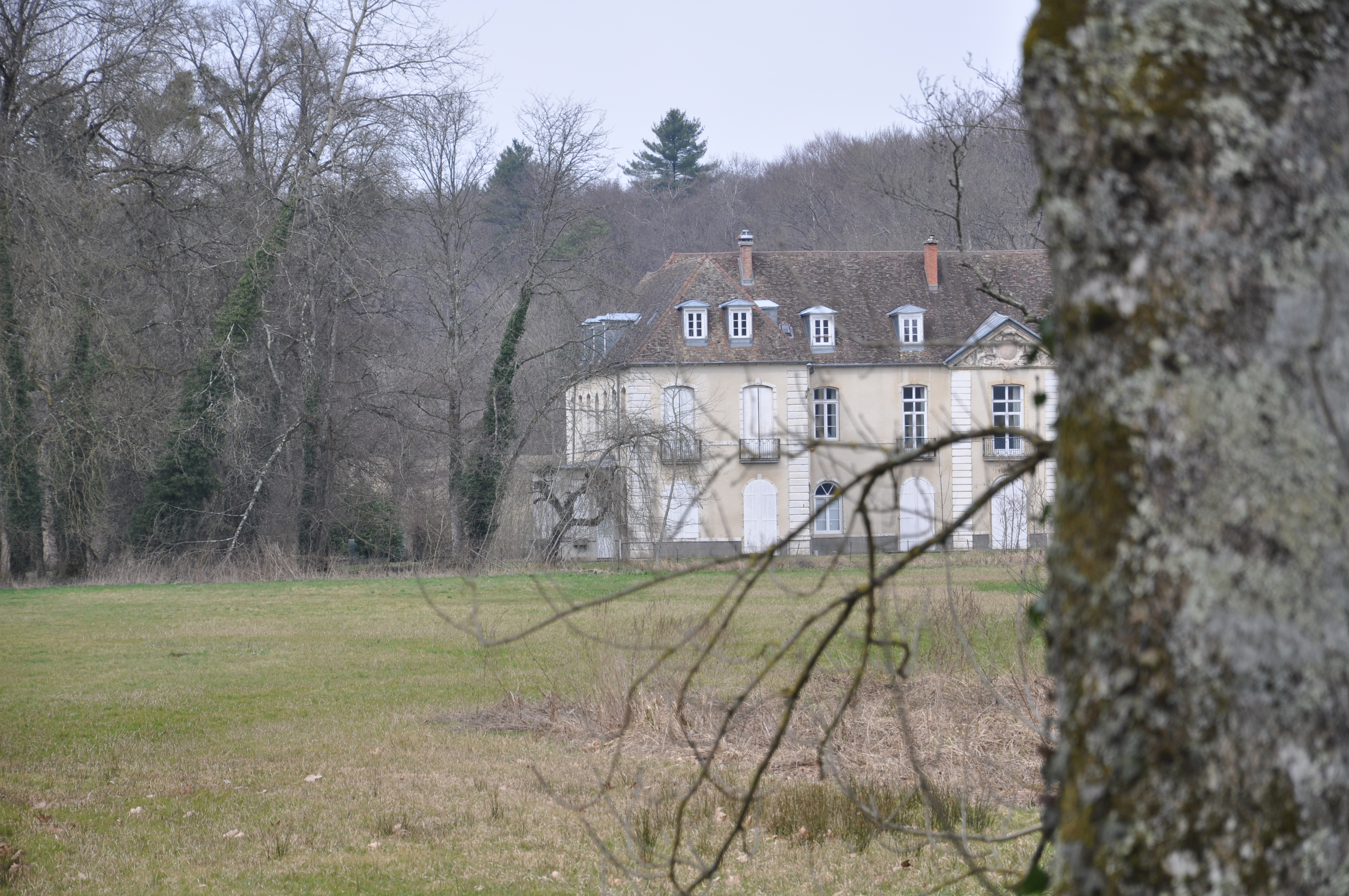
- The chateau in Loulans

- Coat of arms
- Location of Loulans-Verchamp
- Location within France Location within Bourgogne-Franche-Comté
- Coordinates: 47°26′50″N 6°12′24″E
- Country: France
- Region: Bourgogne-Franche-Comté
- Department: Haute-Saône
- Arrondissement: Vesoul
- Canton: Rioz

Government
  - Mayor (2020–2026): Guillaume Blondel-Gaborieau
- Area^{1}: 8.16 km^{2} (3.15 sq mi)
- Highest elevation: 297 m (974 ft)
- Lowest elevation: 232 m (761 ft)
- Population (2023): 460
  - Density: 56/km^{2} (150/sq mi)
- Time zone: UTC+01:00 (CET)
  - Summer (DST): UTC+02:00 (CEST)
- INSEE/Postal code: 70309 /70230
- ^{1} French Land Register data, which excludes lakes, ponds, glaciers > 1 km^{2} (0.386 sq mi or 247 acres) and river estuaries.

Loulans-Verchamp (French pronunciation: [lulɑ̃ vɛʁʃɑ̃]) is a commune in the Haute-Saône department in the region of Bourgogne-Franche-Comté in eastern France.

== Geographical Location ==
Loulans Verchamp is situated at a distance of:

- 12 km from Rioz via road D15
- 25 km from Vesoul via roads D15 and N57
- 30 km from Besançon via roads D25 or D15 and N57
- 120 km from Neuchâtel in Switzerland via N57.
- 160 km from Lausanne in Switzerland via N57.

Loulans Verchamp is neighboured:

- On the north, by Roche-sur-Linotte-et-Sorans-les-Cordiers and Ormenans
- On the north-west by Villers-Pater
- On the west by Beaumotte-Aubertans
- On the south-west by Cenans
- On the south by Germondans of the Doubs region
- On the south-east by Flagey-Rigney of the Doubs region
- On the east by Maussans and Larians-et-Munans
- On the north-east by Montbozon
- The Linotte crosses the village of Loulans Verchamp, to join the river Ognon (Franche-Comté).

== Roads and access ==
- The D15 and the D25 pass through Loulans Verchamp, connecting it to Vesoul on the north and to Besançon on the south.
- The high-speed railway line station Gare de Besançon-Auxon of the LGV Rhin-Rhône is situated at 30 km from Loulans Verchamp. It connects Besançon to Paris in just over two hours, with eight services a day (as of 2011).
- The Vesoul train station is 27 km away.
- The TGV – Gare de Besançon-Viotte train station is 32 km away.
- Neuchâtel (Switzerland) is 120 km away.
- Lausanne (Switzerland) is 160 km away.

== Demographics ==
Historical population
| Year | Pop. | ±% p.a. |
|---|---|---|
| 1968 | 448 | — |
| 1975 | 400 | −1.61% |
| 1982 | 406 | +0.21% |
| 1990 | 354 | −1.70% |
| 1999 | 378 | +0.73% |
| 2007 | 469 | +2.73% |
| 2012 | 499 | +1.25% |
| 2017 | 453 | −1.92% |
| 2023 | 460 | +0.26% |
Source: INSEE

== Commerce ==
In the village there are two bar hotel restaurants, a bakery a hairdresser and a beauty salon.

== Personalities linked to this commune ==
- Dominique Prétot (Papy) – president of the football club Union Sportive Larians – Munans, since 1967.

== Gallery ==
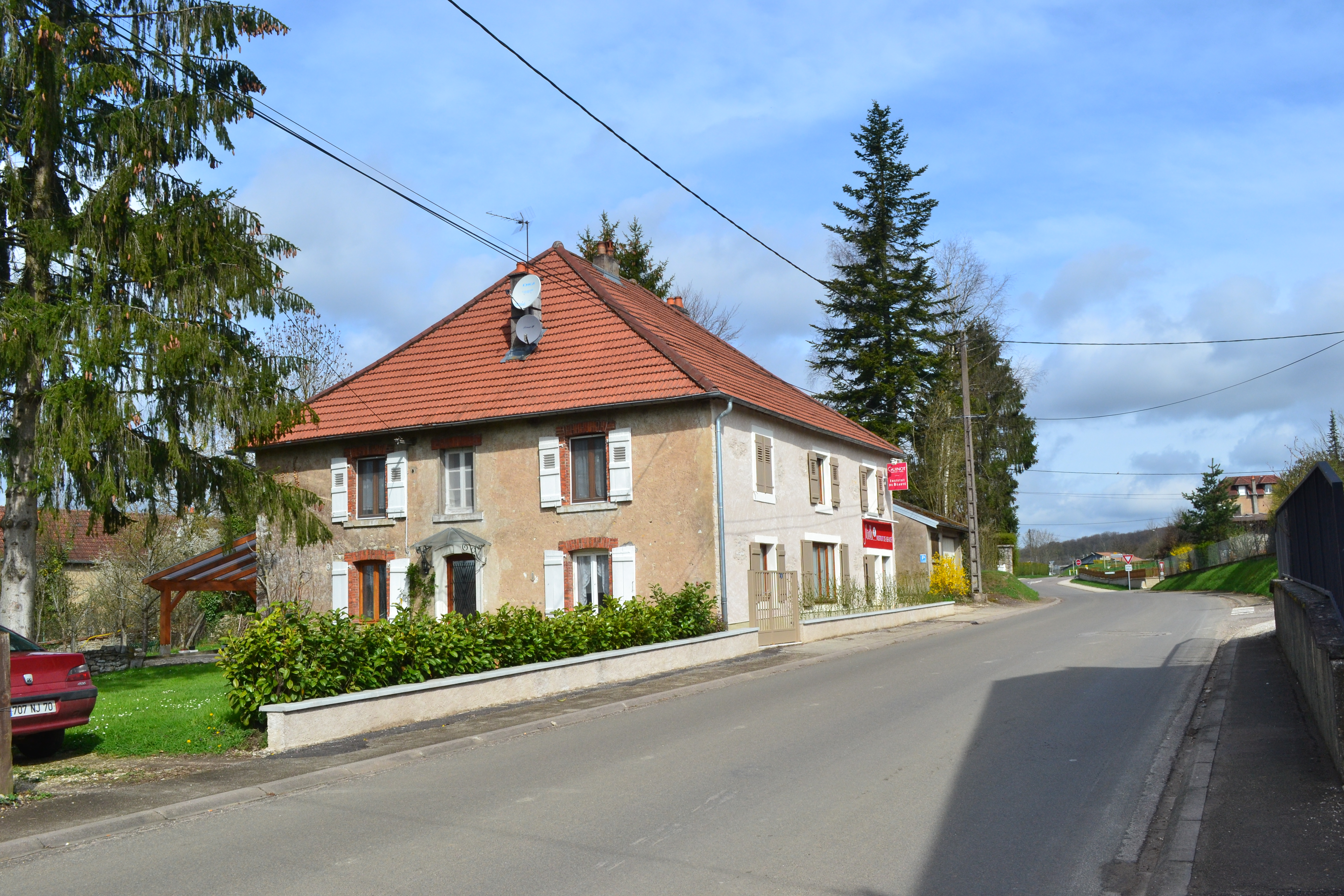
Rue des vignes, Loulans Verchamp

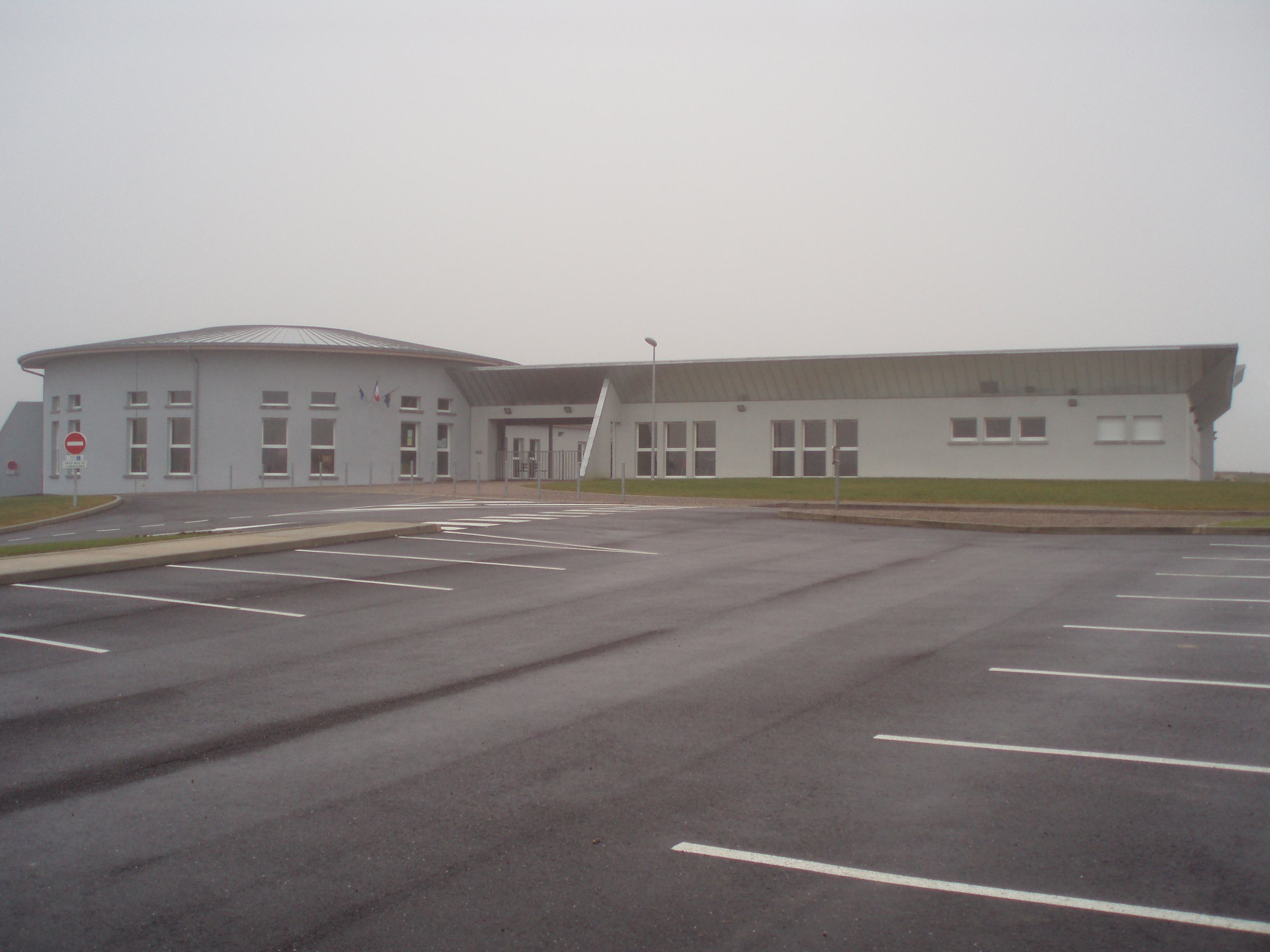
Elementary public school

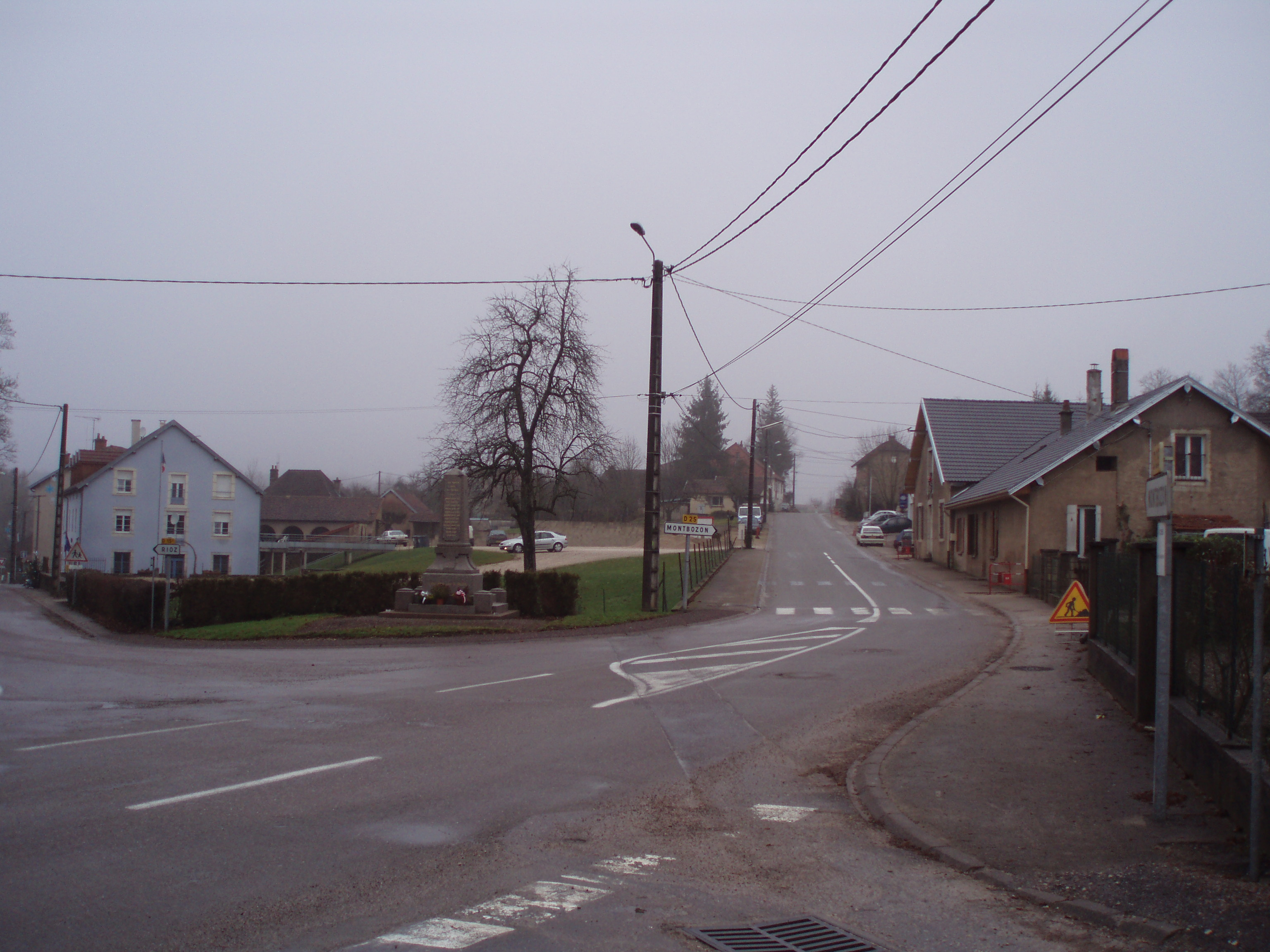
The Memorial Monument

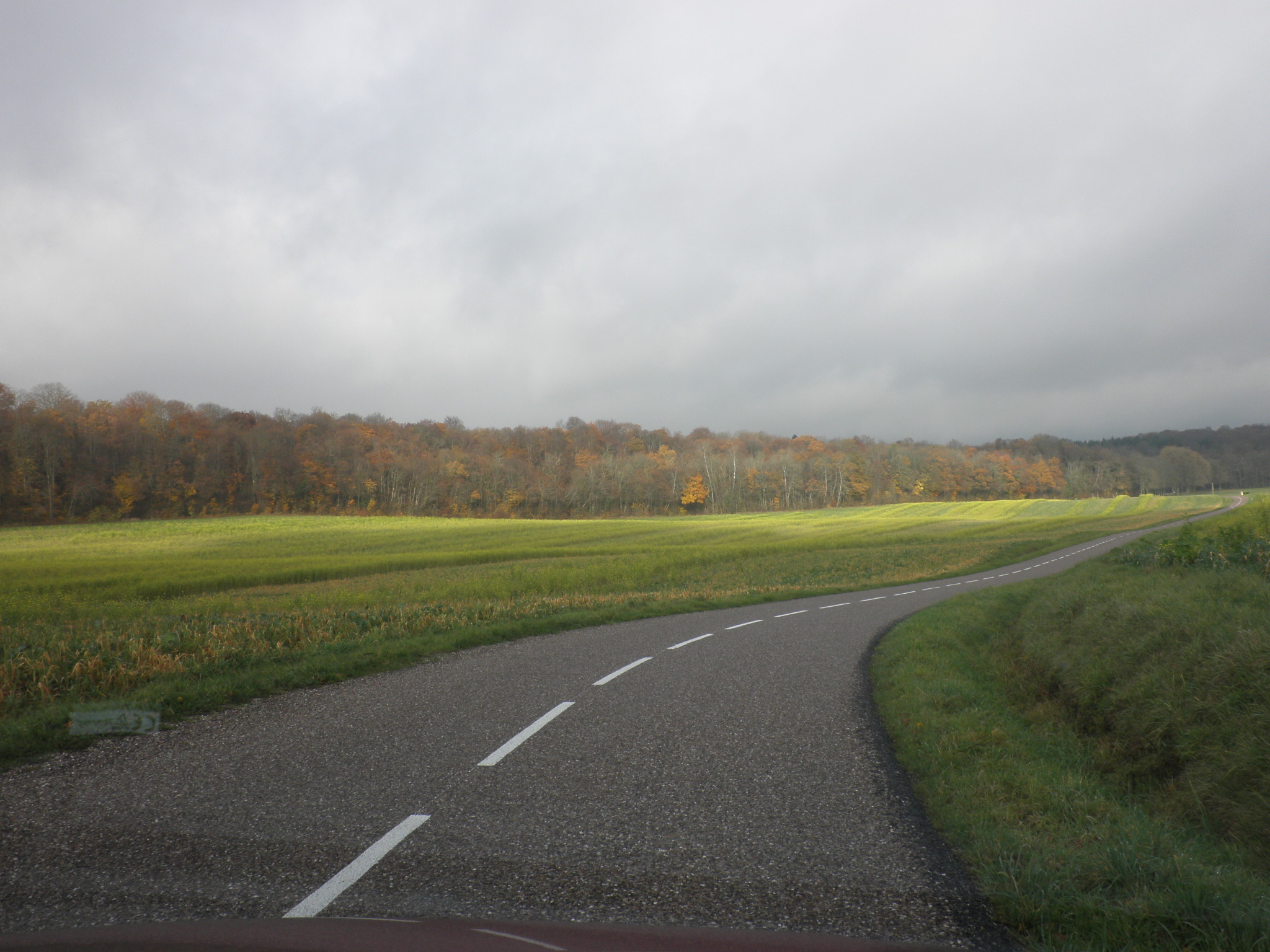
The road to Vesoul – D25

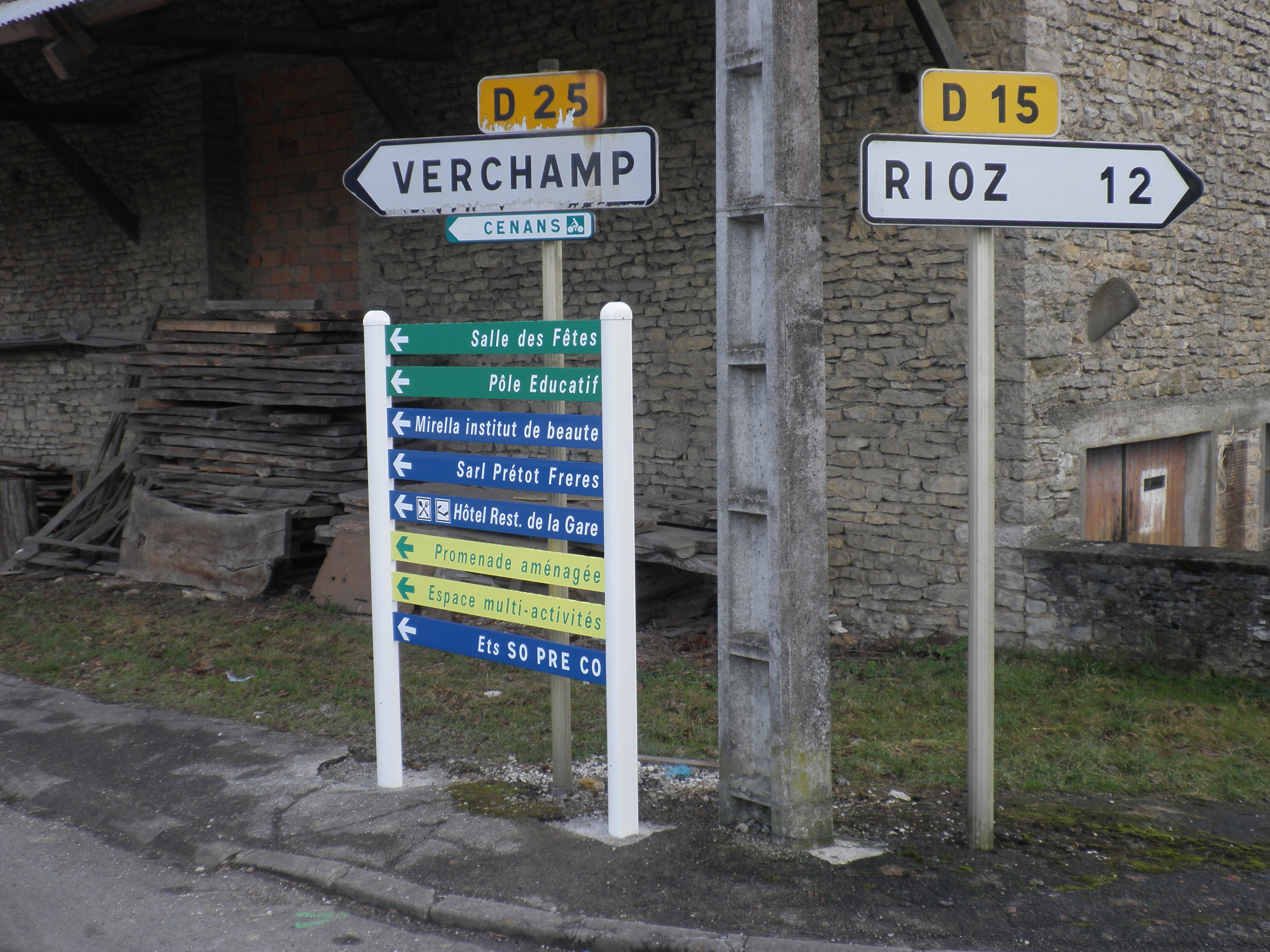
Intersection at Loulans Verchamp

== See also ==
- Communes of the Haute-Saône department
