= Bucey =

Bucey may refer to several communes in France:

- Bucey-en-Othe, in the Aube department
- Bucey-lès-Gy, in the Haute-Saône department
- Bucey-lès-Traves, in the Haute-Saône department
