= Recologne =

Recologne may refer to several communes in France:

- Recologne, Doubs
- Recologne, Haute-Saône
- Recologne-lès-Rioz, in Haute-Saône
