= Louis-Françisque Lélut =

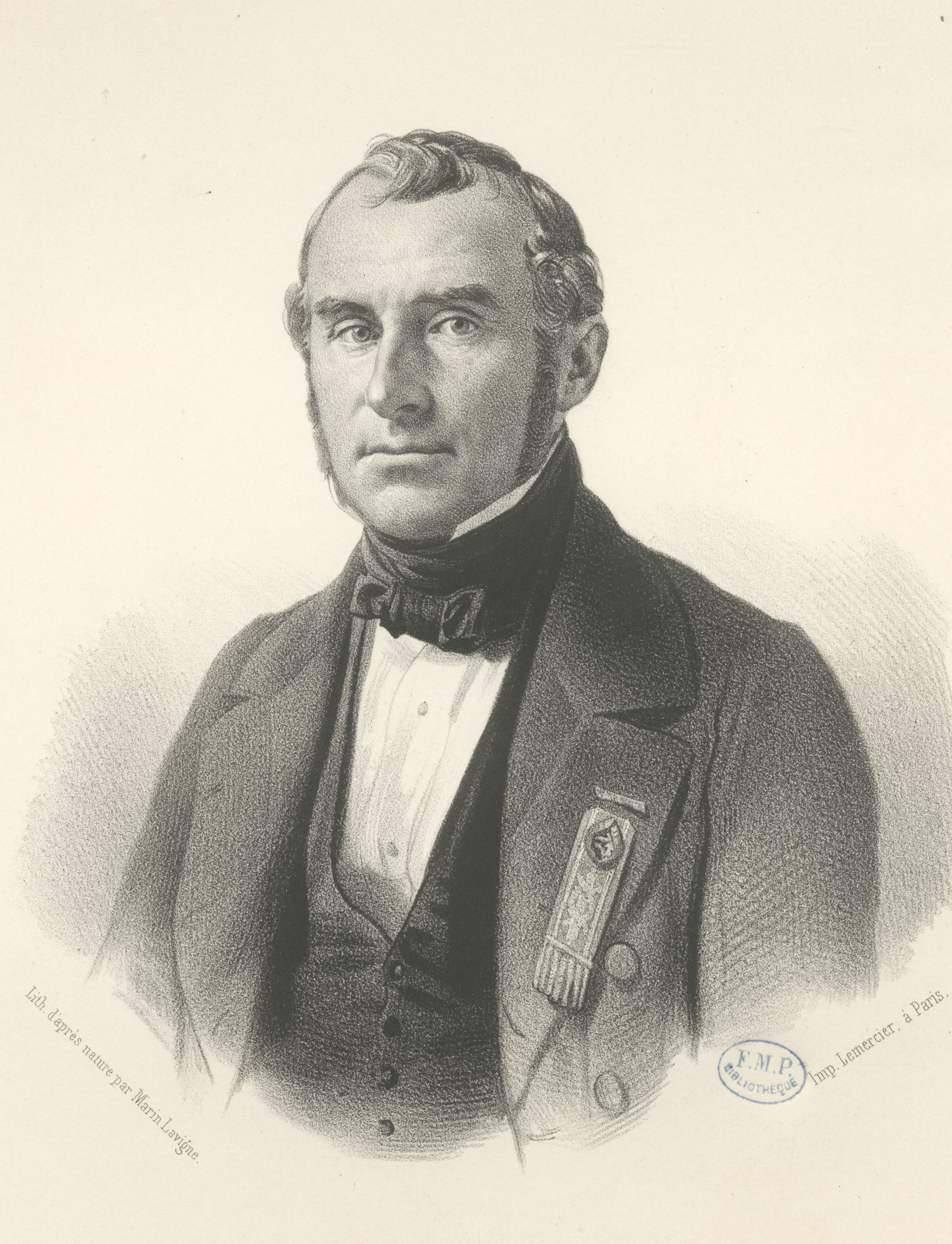
Louis Francisque Lélut

Louis Francisque Lélut (1804–1877) was a French medical doctor and philosopher known for his works Démon de Socrate and L'Amulette de Pascal, where he stated that Socrates and Blaise Pascal were insane.

Born at Gy, a small village in the Haute-Saône department, he was member of the Academy of Moral and Political Sciences and researched mental illnesses and phrenology. His main work was Physiologie de la pensée, published in 1861.

During the Second French Empire he was member of the Legislative Body.
