= Château de Bucey-en-Othe =

Castle in Aube, Grand Est, France

Coordinates: 48°15′48″N 3°51′40″E

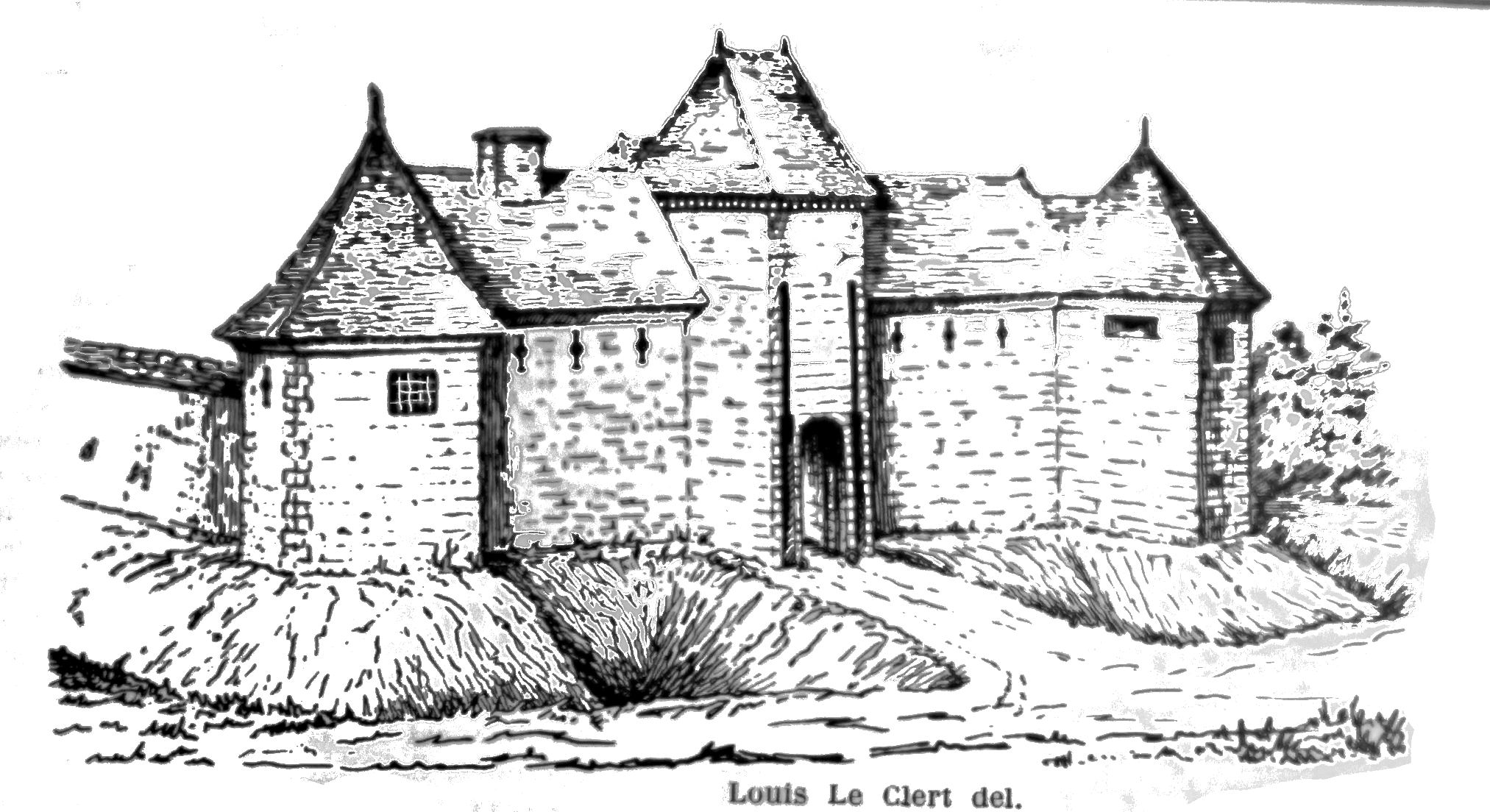
The castle in 1743

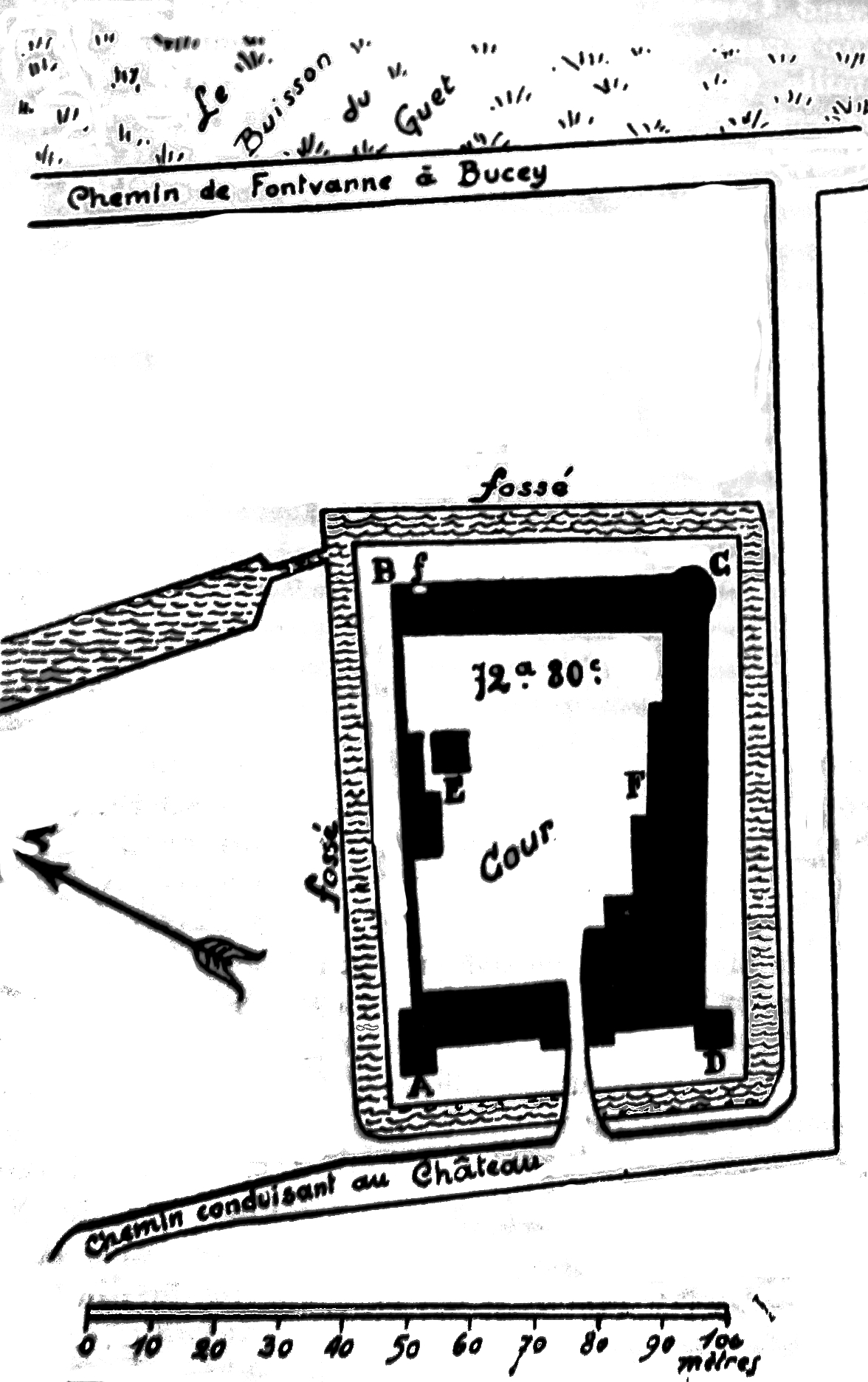
Plan by Charles Fichot

The Château de Bucey-en-Othe is a castle in the commune of Bucey-en-Othe in the Aube département of France.

== Description ==
The castle was constructed in the fourth quarter of the 16th century. An earlier castle existed to the east of the church.

A 19th century survey described the castle as having moats filled with water, trunnions for a drawbridge, towers with arrowslits and an access to a chemin de ronde (wall walk).

In square plan, the castle is today partially surrounded by water. Two square towers stand at the extremities. The entrances for people and carriages have been blocked to allow an extension to the logis in the 18th and 19th centuries have damaged the façade on the courtyard. This tower is surrounded by several buildings, including a dovecote. This type of manor was common in the Champagne region from the end of the 16th to the beginning of the 17th century.

The façades and the roofs of the buildings (logis and agricultural buildings enclosing the courtyard), as well as the moat have been listed since 2005 as a monument historique by the French Ministry of Culture.

== See also ==
- List of castles in France
