= Bucey-lès-Gy =

- Commune
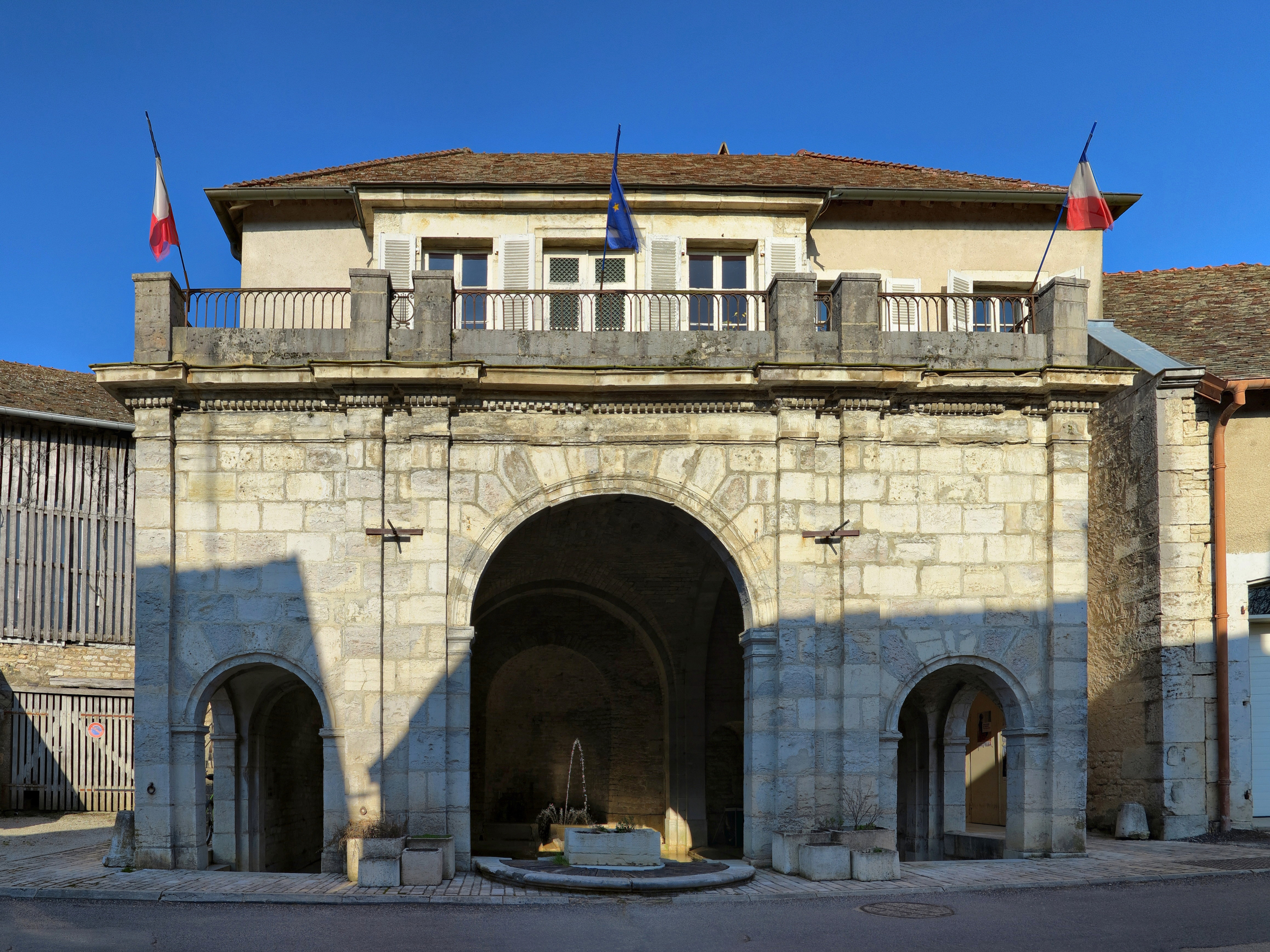
- The town hall in Bucey-lès-Gy

- Coat of arms
- Location of Bucey-lès-Gy
- Location within France Location within Bourgogne-Franche-Comté
- Coordinates: 47°25′26″N 5°50′37″E
- Country: France
- Region: Bourgogne-Franche-Comté
- Department: Haute-Saône
- Arrondissement: Vesoul
- Canton: Marnay

Government
  - Mayor (2020–2026): Freddy Kopec
- Area^{1}: 21.30 km^{2} (8.22 sq mi)
- Highest elevation: 406 m (1,332 ft)
- Lowest elevation: 206 m (676 ft)
- Population (2023): 575
  - Density: 27.0/km^{2} (69.9/sq mi)
- Time zone: UTC+01:00 (CET)
  - Summer (DST): UTC+02:00 (CEST)
- INSEE/Postal code: 70104 /70700
- ^{1} French Land Register data, which excludes lakes, ponds, glaciers > 1 km^{2} (0.386 sq mi or 247 acres) and river estuaries.

Bucey-lès-Gy (French pronunciation: [bysɛ lɛ ʒi], literally Bucey near Gy) is a commune in the Haute-Saône department in the region of Bourgogne-Franche-Comté in eastern France.

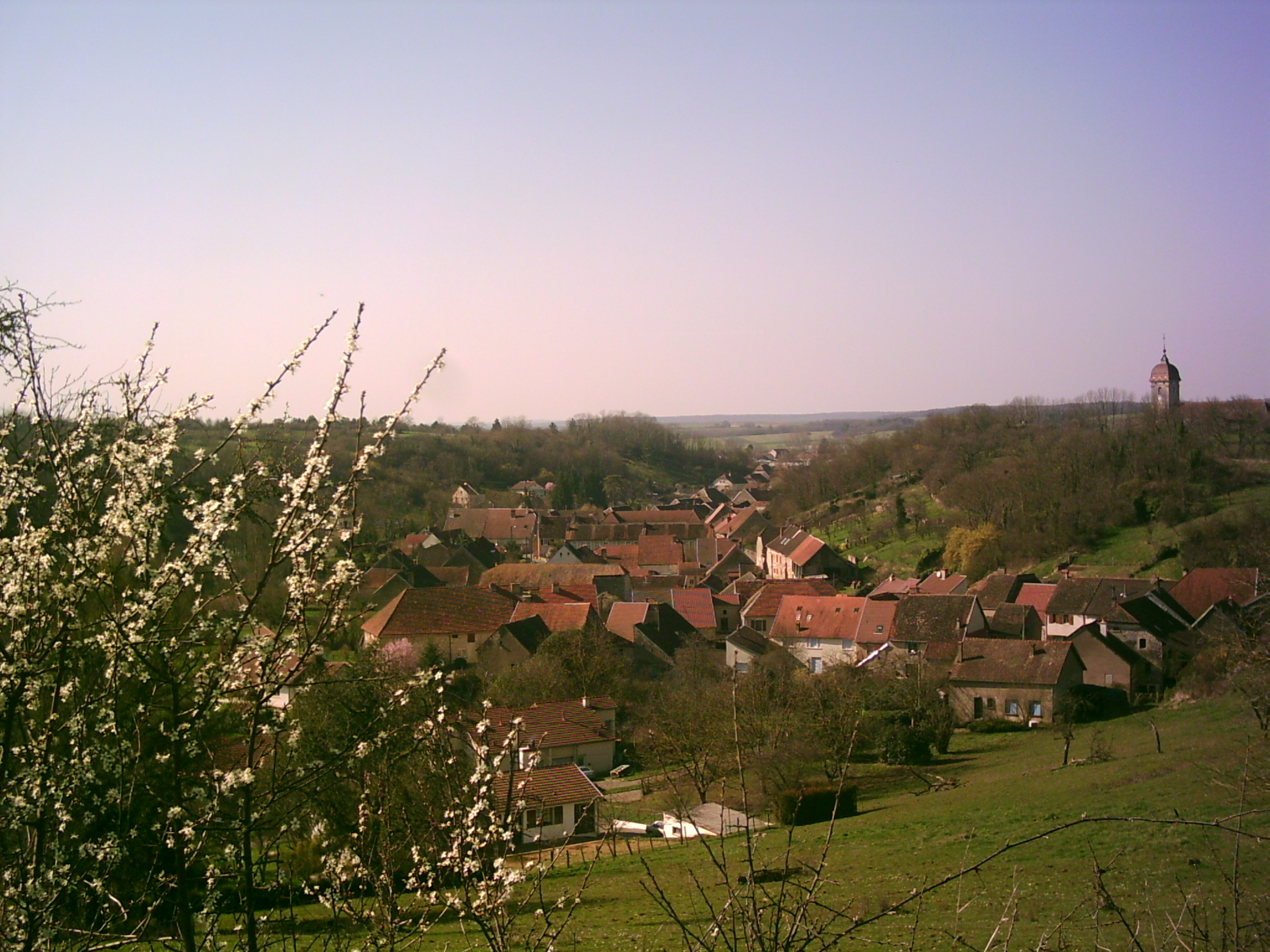
Bucey-lès-Gy in Spring

== See also ==
- Communes of the Haute-Saône department
