= Beaujeu-Saint-Vallier-Pierrejux-et-Quitteur =

- Commune
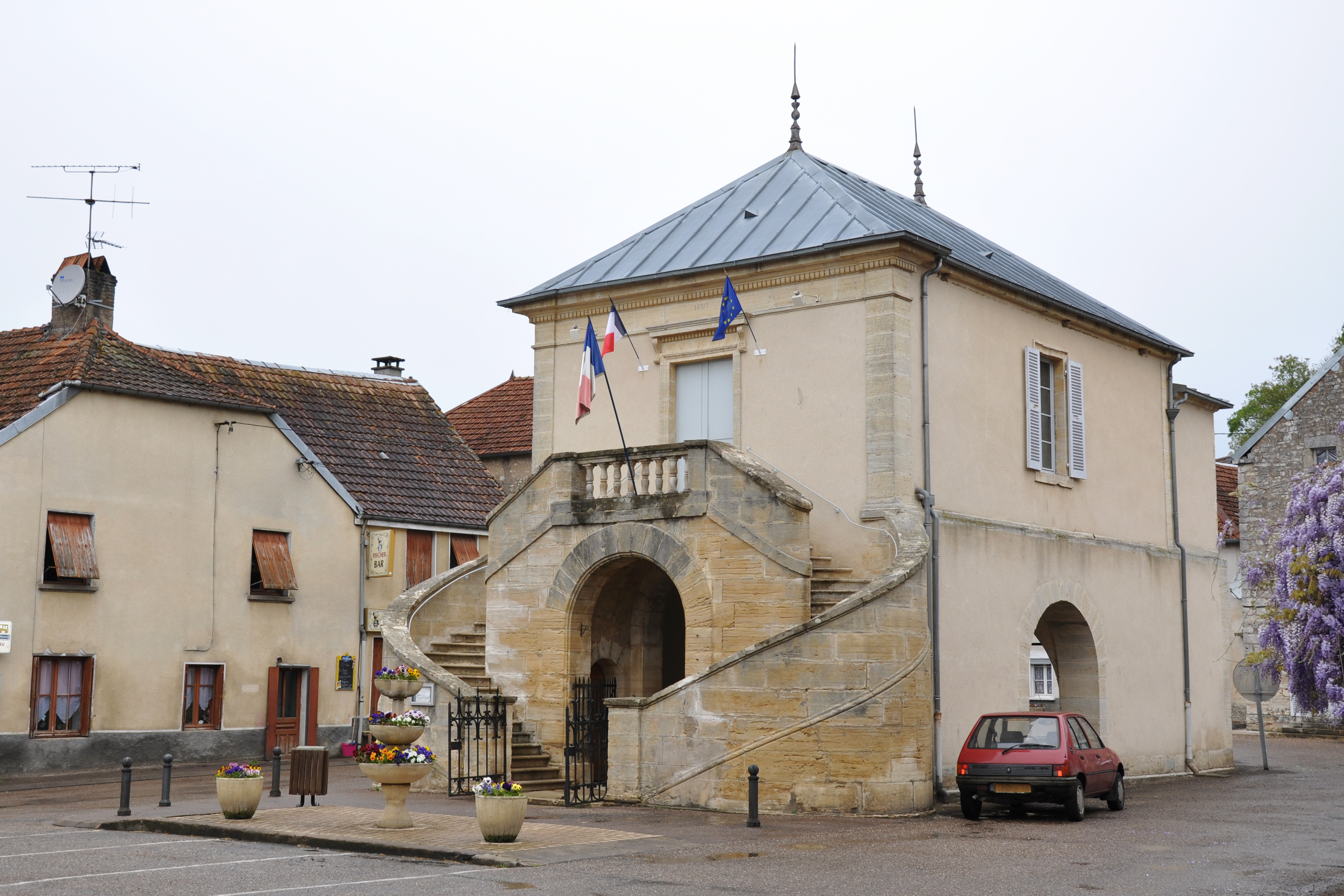
- The town hall in Beaujeu

- Coat of arms
- Location of Beaujeu-Saint-Vallier-Pierrejux-et-Quitteur
- Location within France Location within Bourgogne-Franche-Comté
- Coordinates: 47°30′19″N 5°40′37″E
- Country: France
- Region: Bourgogne-Franche-Comté
- Department: Haute-Saône
- Arrondissement: Vesoul
- Canton: Scey-sur-Saône-et-Saint-Albin
- Area^{1}: 35.12 km^{2} (13.56 sq mi)
- Highest elevation: 252 m (827 ft)
- Lowest elevation: 198 m (650 ft)
- Population (2023): 921
  - Density: 26.2/km^{2} (67.9/sq mi)
- Time zone: UTC+01:00 (CET)
  - Summer (DST): UTC+02:00 (CEST)
- INSEE/Postal code: 70058 /70100
- ^{1} French Land Register data, which excludes lakes, ponds, glaciers > 1 km^{2} (0.386 sq mi or 247 acres) and river estuaries.

Beaujeu-Saint-Vallier-Pierrejux-et-Quitteur (French pronunciation: [boʒø sɛ̃ valje pjɛʁʒy e kitœʁ]) is a commune in the Haute-Saône department in the region of Bourgogne-Franche-Comté in eastern France.

== See also ==
- Communes of the Haute-Saône department
