= Bucey-lès-Traves =

- Commune
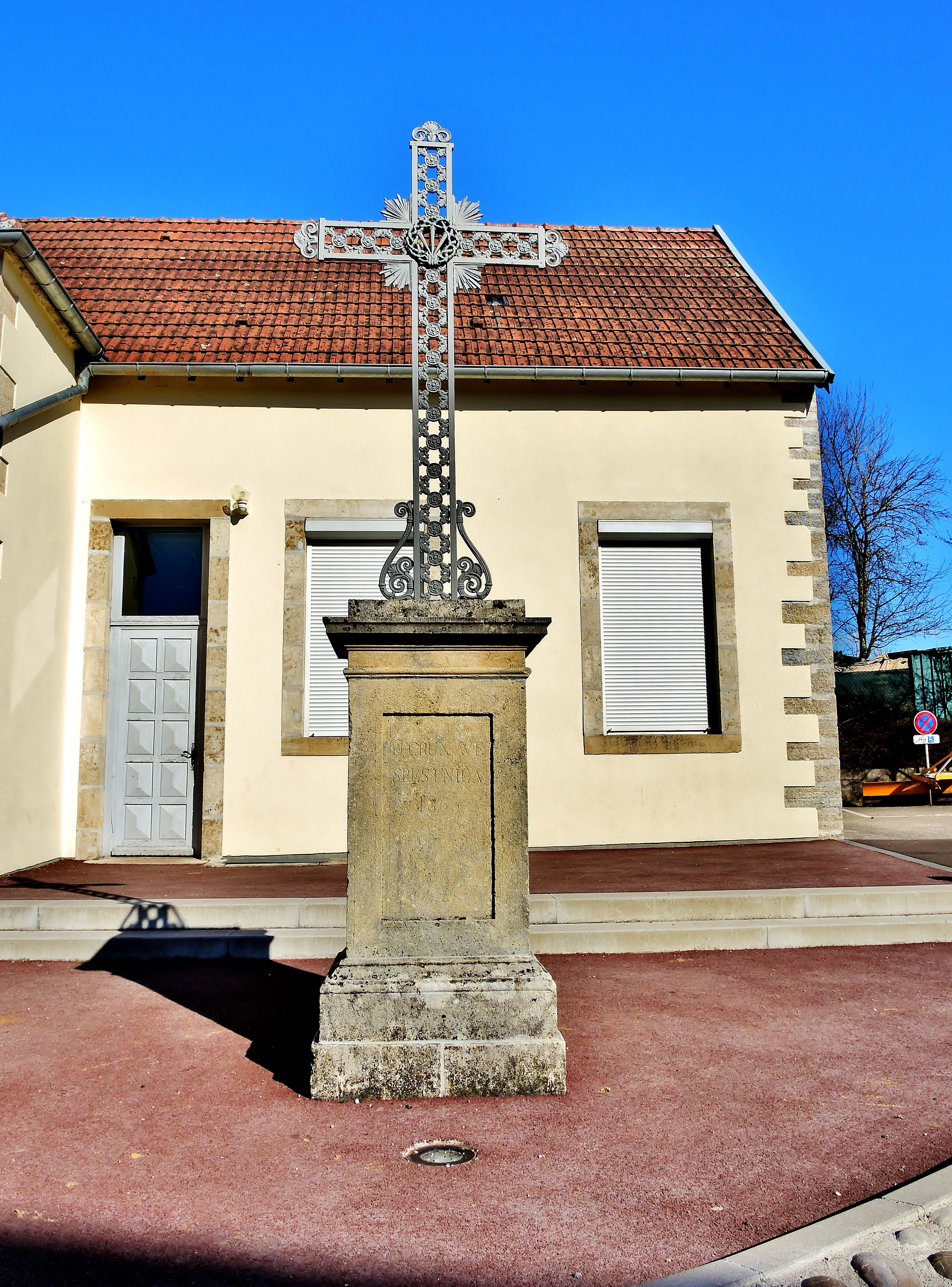
- The cross of 1865 and town hall in Bucey-lès-Traves

- Coat of arms
- Location of Bucey-lès-Traves
- Location within France Location within Bourgogne-Franche-Comté
- Coordinates: 47°37′39″N 5°58′56″E
- Country: France
- Region: Bourgogne-Franche-Comté
- Department: Haute-Saône
- Arrondissement: Vesoul
- Canton: Scey-sur-Saône-et-Saint-Albin
- Area^{1}: 2.79 km^{2} (1.08 sq mi)
- Highest elevation: 250 m (820 ft)
- Lowest elevation: 203 m (666 ft)
- Population (2023): 144
  - Density: 51.6/km^{2} (134/sq mi)
- Time zone: UTC+01:00 (CET)
  - Summer (DST): UTC+02:00 (CEST)
- INSEE/Postal code: 70105 /70360
- ^{1} French Land Register data, which excludes lakes, ponds, glaciers > 1 km^{2} (0.386 sq mi or 247 acres) and river estuaries.

Bucey-lès-Traves (French pronunciation: [bysɛ lɛ tʁav], literally Bucey near Traves) is a commune in the Haute-Saône department in the region of Bourgogne-Franche-Comté in eastern France.

== See also ==
- Communes of the Haute-Saône department
