= Bucey-en-Othe =

Commune in Grand Est, France

- Commune
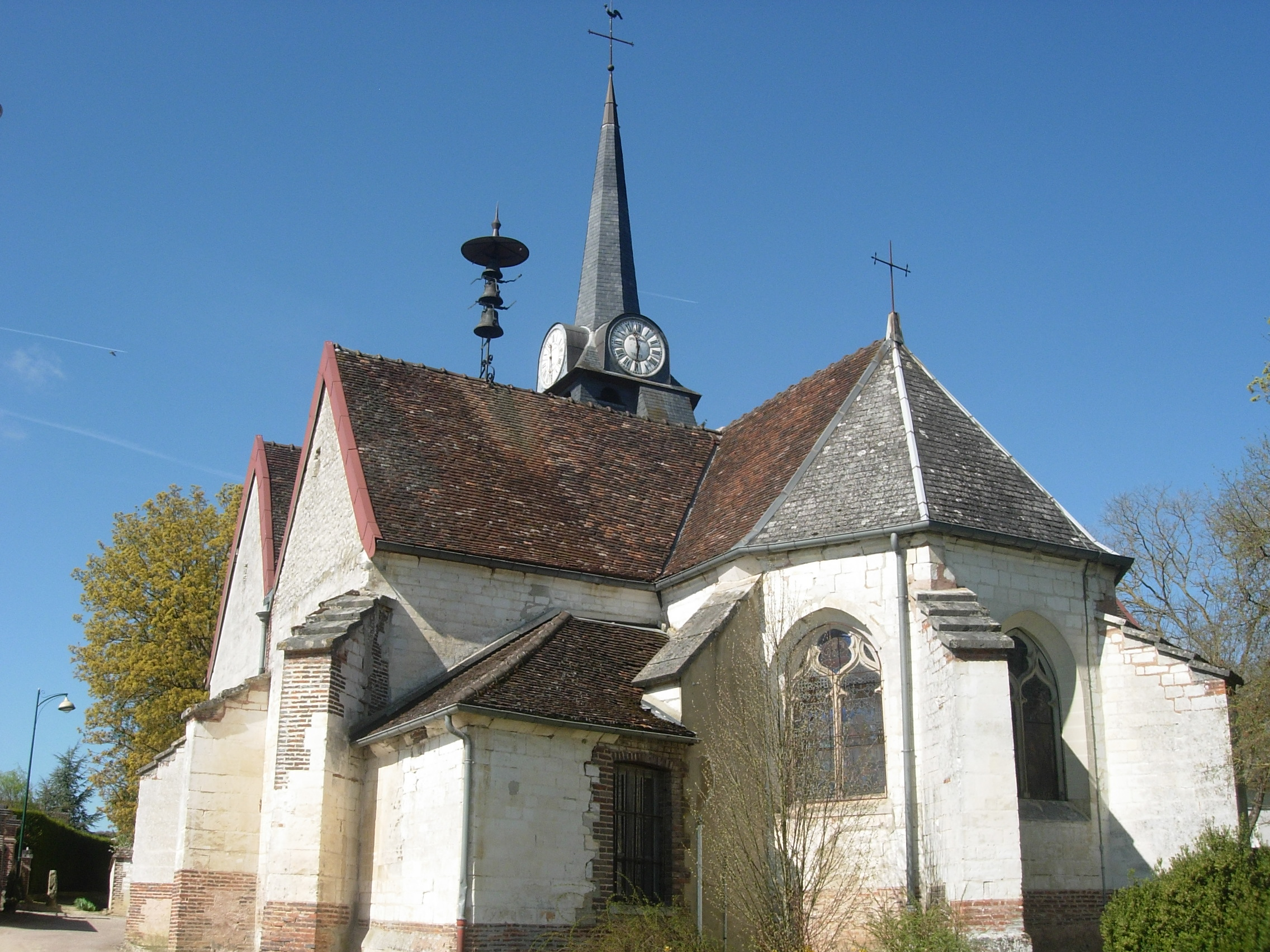
- The church in Bucey-en-Othe

- Coat of arms
- Location of Bucey-en-Othe
- Location within France Location within Grand Est
- Coordinates: 48°15′36″N 3°51′54″E
- Country: France
- Region: Grand Est
- Department: Aube
- Arrondissement: Troyes
- Canton: Aix-Villemaur-Pâlis
- Intercommunality: CA Troyes Champagne Métropole

Government
  - Mayor (2020–2026): Pascal Desrousseaux
- Area^{1}: 13.03 km^{2} (5.03 sq mi)
- Elevation: 143 m (469 ft)
- Population (2023): 430
  - Density: 33/km^{2} (85/sq mi)
- Time zone: UTC+01:00 (CET)
  - Summer (DST): UTC+02:00 (CEST)
- INSEE/Postal code: 10066 /10190
- ^{1} French Land Register data, which excludes lakes, ponds, glaciers > 1 km^{2} (0.386 sq mi or 247 acres) and river estuaries.

Bucey-en-Othe (French pronunciation: [busɛ ɑ̃.n‿ɔt], lit. 'Bucey in Othe') is a commune in the Aube department in north-central France. It belongs administratively to the arrondissement of Troyes and the canton of Estissac. With a population of approximately 411 residents, the commune spans an area of about 13.03 square kilometers. Bucey-en-Othe forms part of the intercommunal structure known as the Communauté de communes des Portes du Pays d’Othe, which provides various regional services and governance coordination.

== Population ==
Historical population
| Year | Pop. | ±% p.a. |
|---|---|---|
| 1968 | 224 | — |
| 1975 | 221 | −0.19% |
| 1982 | 317 | +5.29% |
| 1990 | 341 | +0.92% |
| 1999 | 341 | +0.00% |
| 2007 | 416 | +2.52% |
| 2012 | 433 | +0.80% |
| 2017 | 430 | −0.14% |
| 2023 | 430 | +0.00% |
Source: INSEE

== Sights and monuments ==
- Château de Bucey-en-Othe: 16th century castle listed since 2005 as a monument historique by the French Ministry of Culture.

== See also ==
- Communes of the Aube department
