= Recologne-lès-Rioz =

- Commune
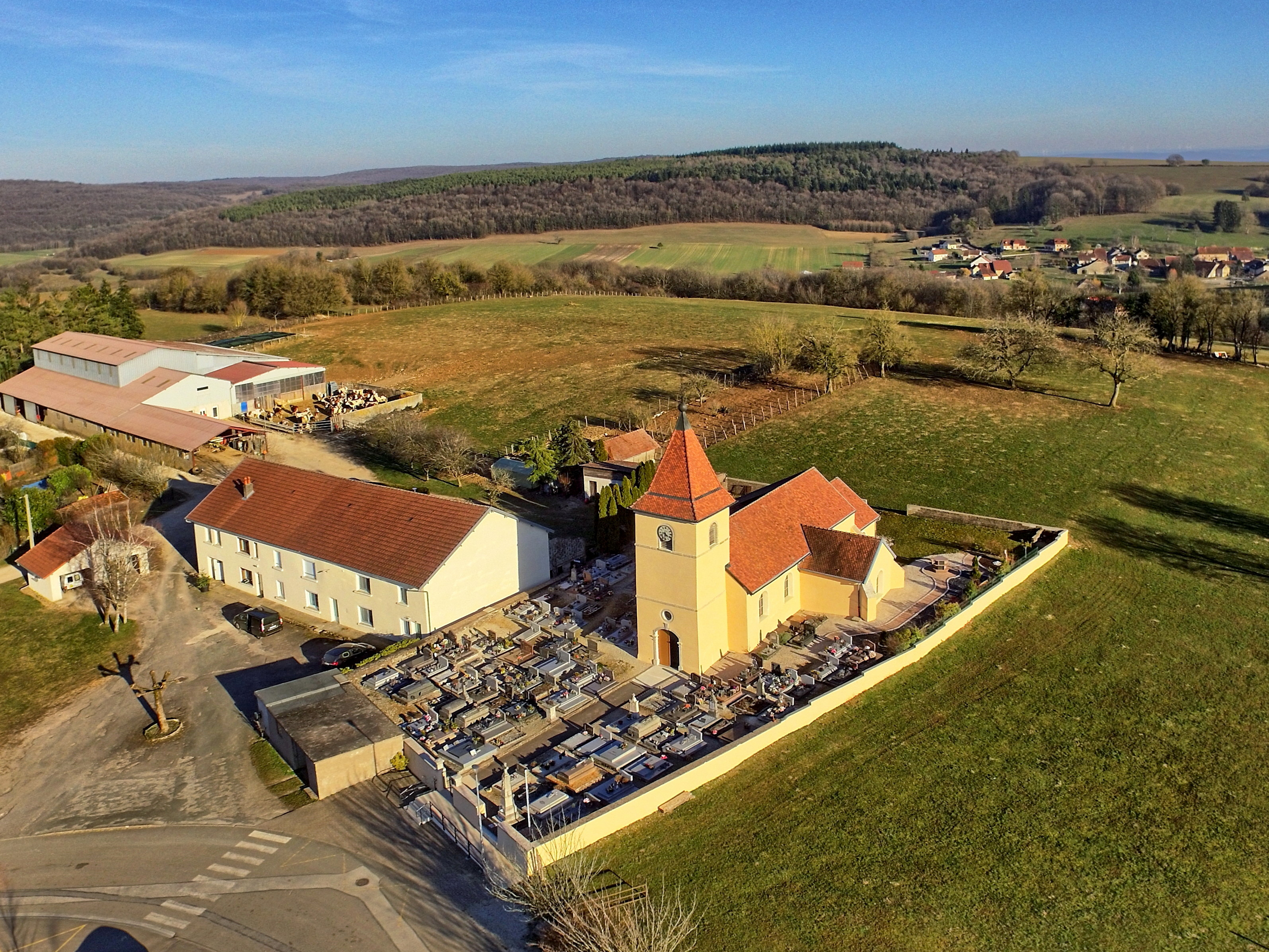
- The church in Recologne-lès-Rioz

- Coat of arms
- Location of Recologne-lès-Rioz
- Location within France Location within Bourgogne-Franche-Comté
- Coordinates: 47°28′31″N 5°59′16″E
- Country: France
- Region: Bourgogne-Franche-Comté
- Department: Haute-Saône
- Arrondissement: Vesoul
- Canton: Rioz

Government
  - Mayor (2020–2026): Robert Travaillot
- Area^{1}: 10.18 km^{2} (3.93 sq mi)
- Highest elevation: 415 m (1,362 ft)
- Lowest elevation: 265 m (869 ft)
- Population (2023): 288
  - Density: 28.3/km^{2} (73.3/sq mi)
- Time zone: UTC+01:00 (CET)
  - Summer (DST): UTC+02:00 (CEST)
- INSEE/Postal code: 70441 /70190
- ^{1} French Land Register data, which excludes lakes, ponds, glaciers > 1 km^{2} (0.386 sq mi or 247 acres) and river estuaries.

Recologne-lès-Rioz (French pronunciation: [ʁəkɔlɔɲ lɛ ʁjo], literally Recologne near Rioz) is a commune in the Haute-Saône department in the region of Bourgogne-Franche-Comté in eastern France.

== See also ==
- Communes of the Haute-Saône department
