= Gy, Haute-Saône =

Gy
- Commune
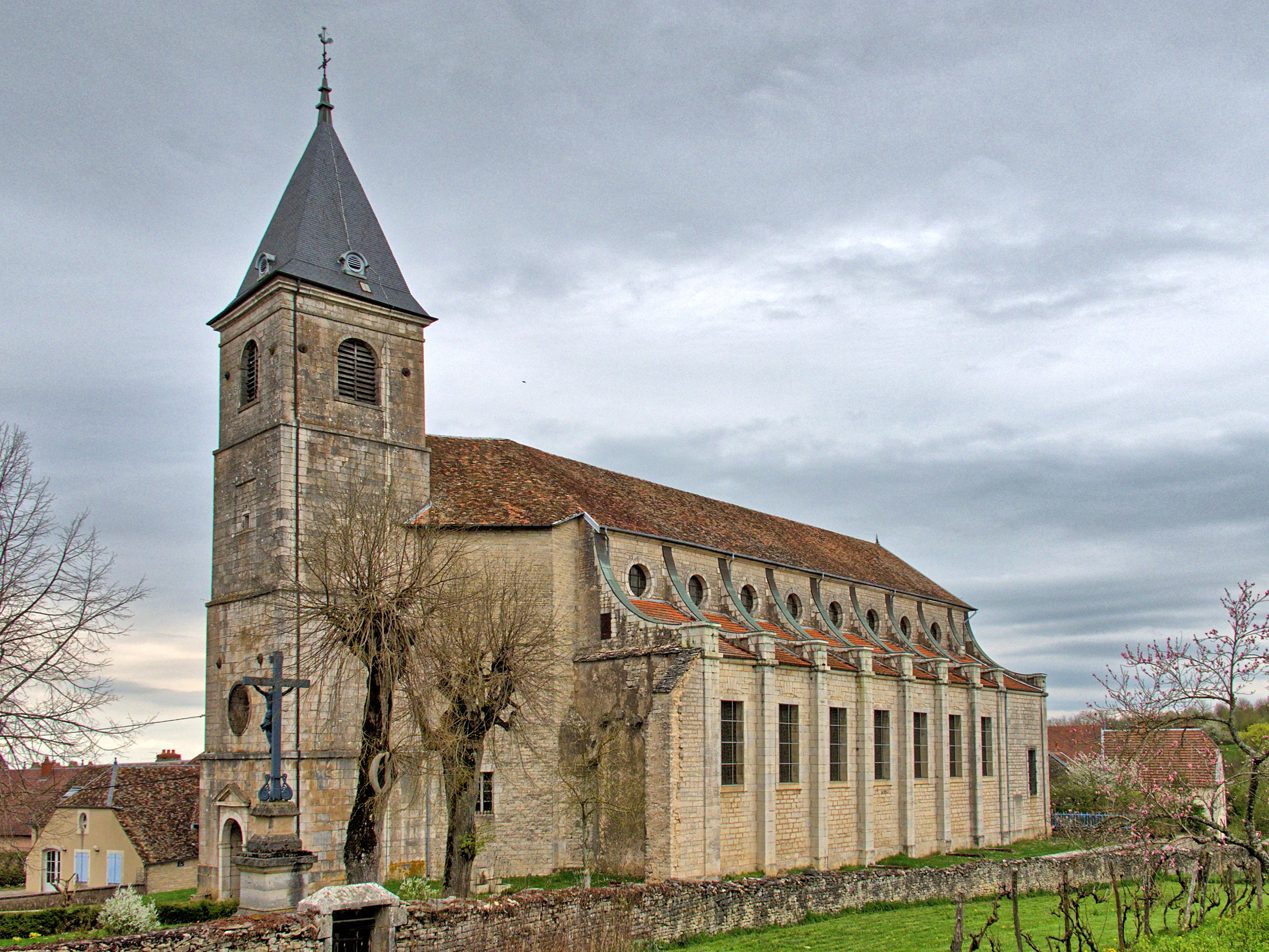
- Church

- Coat of arms
- Location of Gy
- Location within France Location within Bourgogne-Franche-Comté
- Coordinates: 47°24′25″N 5°48′47″E
- Country: France
- Region: Bourgogne-Franche-Comté
- Department: Haute-Saône
- Arrondissement: Vesoul
- Canton: Marnay

Government
  - Mayor (2020–2026): Christelle Clement
- Area^{1}: 24.60 km^{2} (9.50 sq mi)
- Highest elevation: 380 m (1,250 ft)
- Lowest elevation: 198 m (650 ft)
- Population (2023): 1,049
  - Density: 42.64/km^{2} (110.4/sq mi)
- Time zone: UTC+01:00 (CET)
  - Summer (DST): UTC+02:00 (CEST)
- INSEE/Postal code: 70282 /70700
- ^{1} French Land Register data, which excludes lakes, ponds, glaciers > 1 km^{2} (0.386 sq mi or 247 acres) and river estuaries.

Gy (French pronunciation: [ʒi]) is a commune in the Haute-Saône department in the region of Bourgogne-Franche-Comté in eastern France.

== History ==
In 1389, a dispute arose over the rights to mint coins between the Duke of Burgundy, and the Archbishop of Besançon Guillaume de Vergy. The Bishop excommunicated the duke and several companions. In response, the Duke of Burgundy gave siege to the fortresses of Noroy and the castle of Gy. However, the Archbishop escaped via an underground passage and found refuge in Avignon where he excommunicated the count of Burgundy.

By 1801, the population of the town had reached 2,695, and peaked about a decade later. By 1901 it had dropped to 1,621 people and by 2017, only 1,049.

== Landmarks ==
- The Château de Gyrésidence des archevêques de Besançon
- Habitat vigneron et vieux bourg médiéval
- Hôtel de ville de Gy
- Église Saint-Symphorien de Gy
- Grande fontaine de Gy
- Lavoir de Gy

== Notable people ==
- Claude-Antoine Bolot
- Luis Francisque Lélut
- Noël André (1728-1808).
- Charles Marie Albert Travelet.
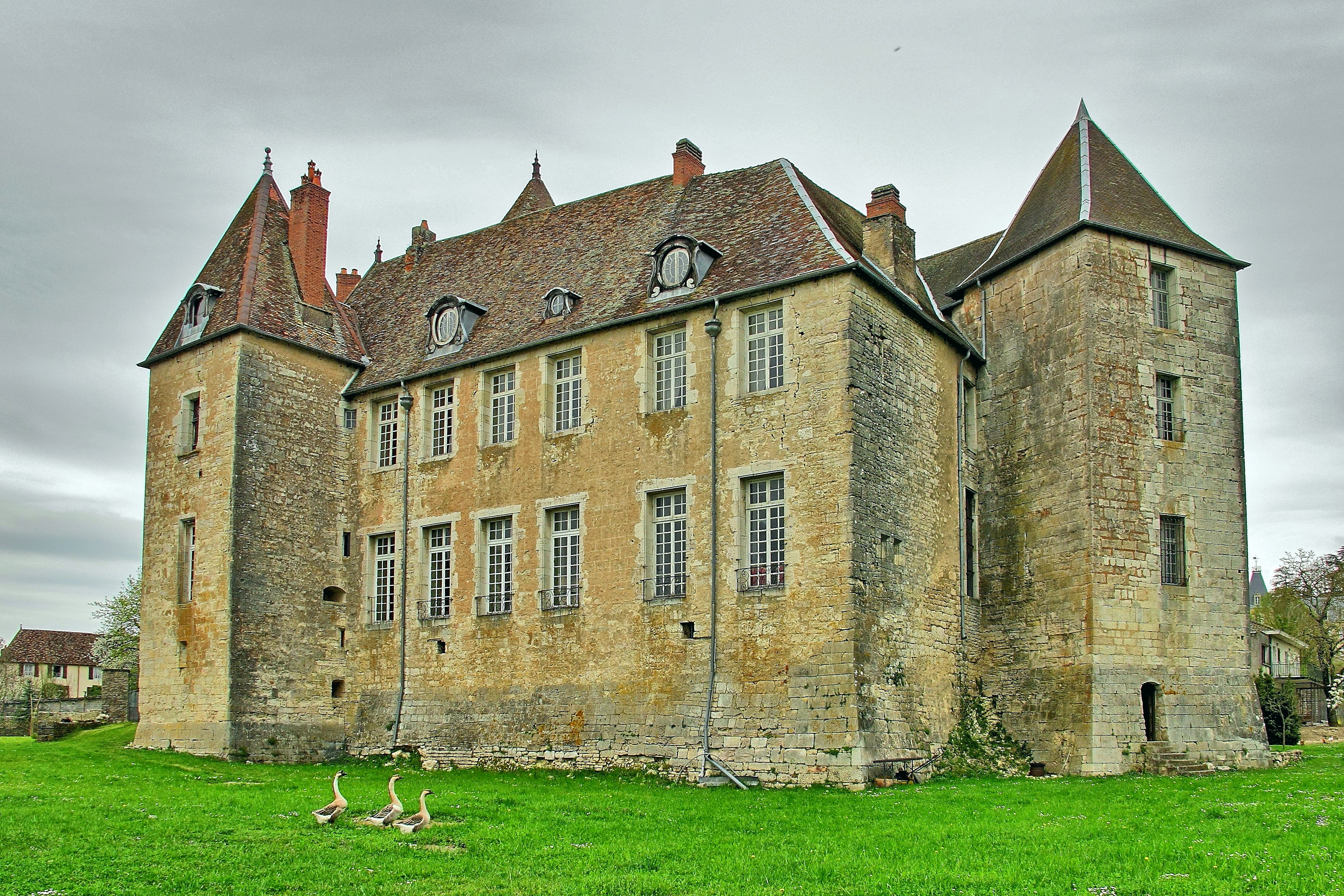
The Château de Gy

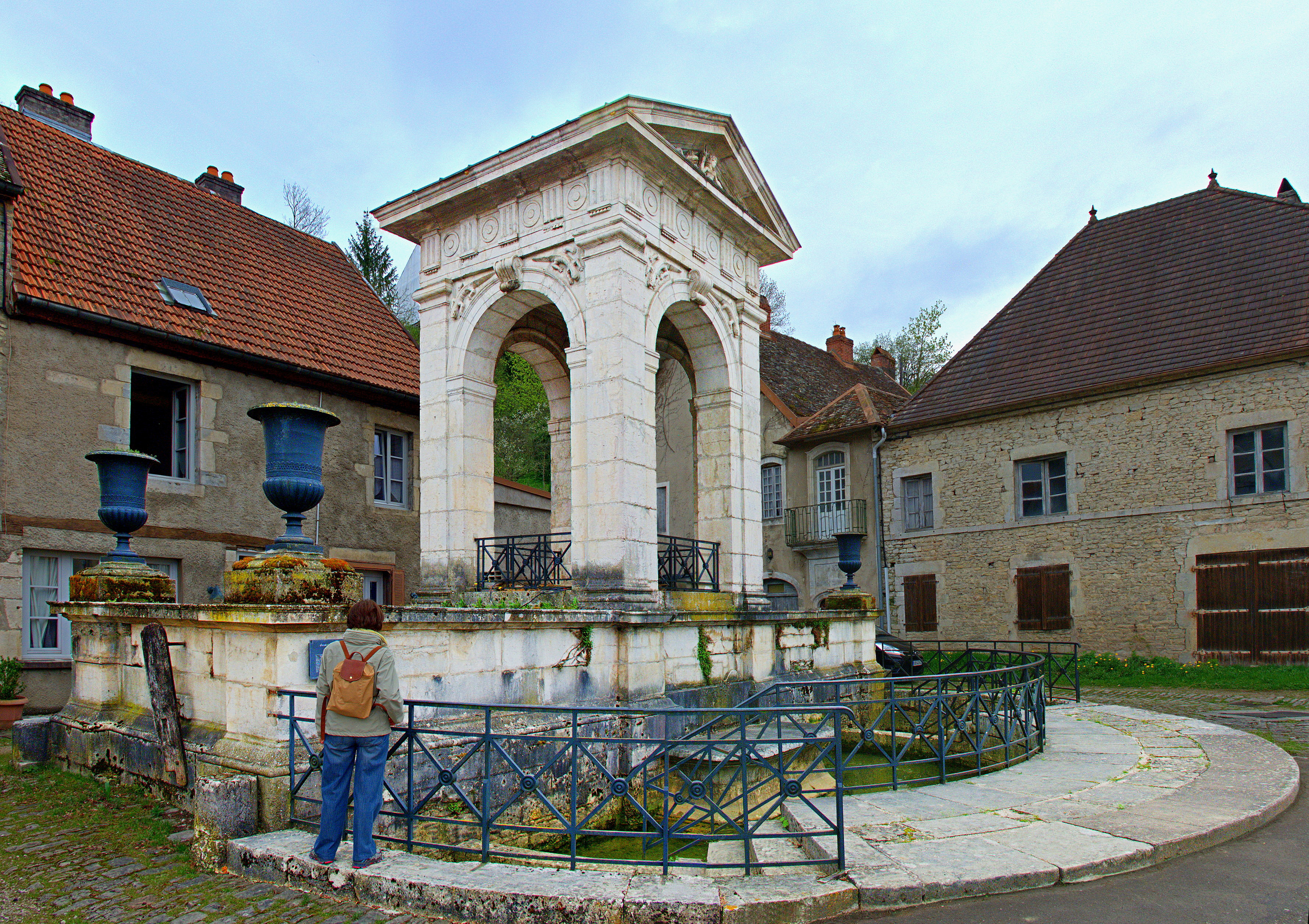
The Grande fontaine de Gy

== See also ==
- Communes of the Haute-Saône department
