= Bèze (river) =

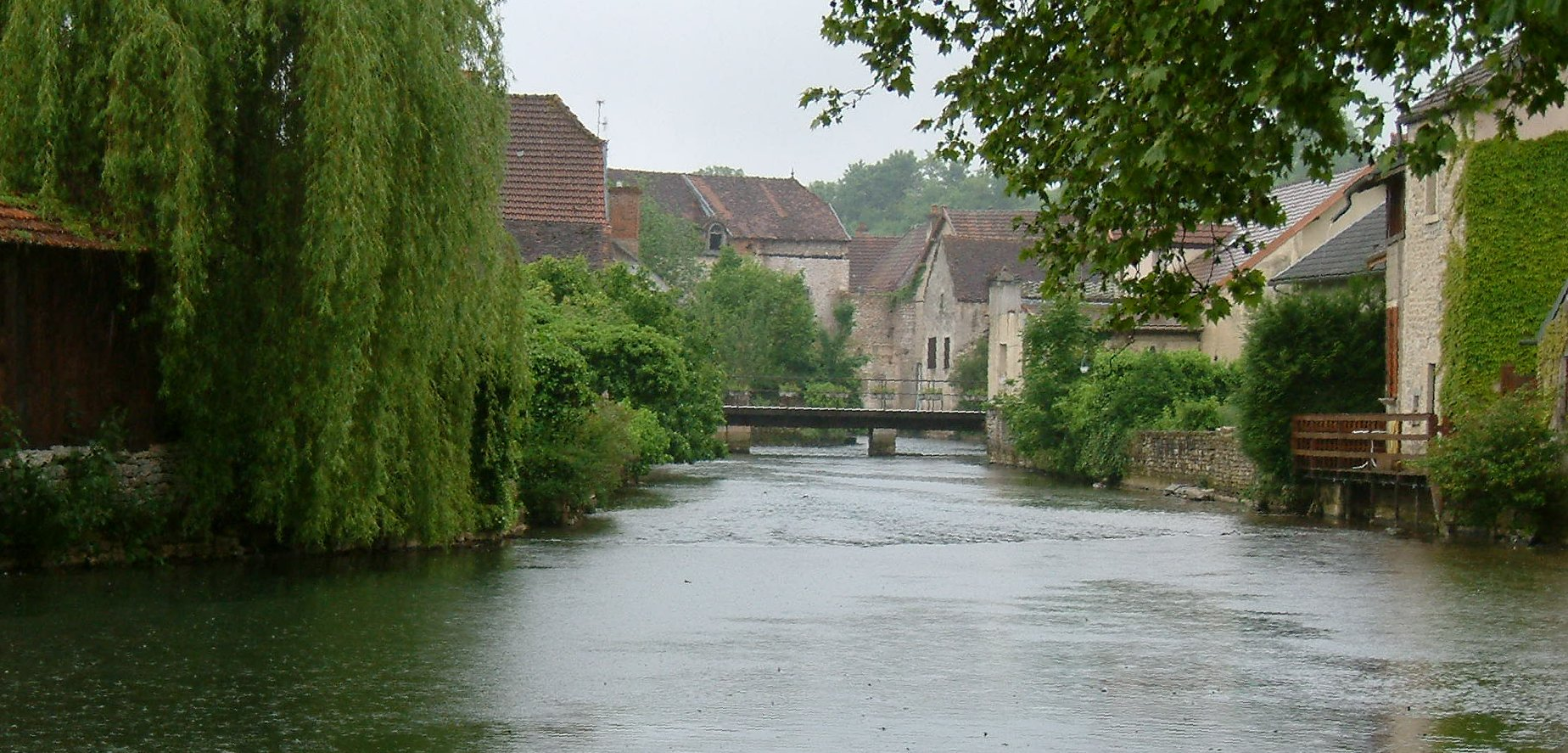
- La Bèze crossing Bèze.

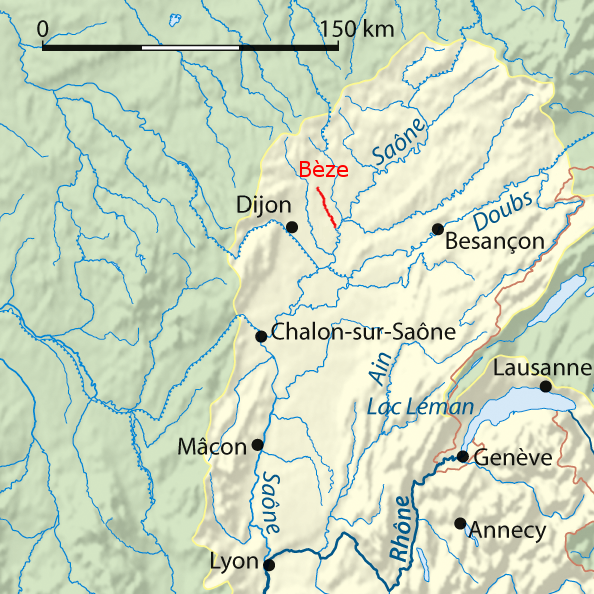
- La Bèze, tributary of the Saône

- Location within France

Location
- Country: France
- Region: Bourgogne-Franche-Comté
- Department: Côte-d'Or

Physical characteristics
- Source: Grotte de la Crétanne
  - location: Bèze
  - coordinates: 47°28′14″N 05°16′14″E
  - elevation: 220 metres (720 ft)
- Mouth: Saône
  - location: Pontailler-sur-Saône / Vonges
  - coordinates: 47°17′27.14″N 5°24′40.06″E
  - elevation: 184 metres (604 ft)
- Length: 31.2 kilometres (19.4 mi)
- Basin size: 550 square kilometres (210 sq mi)
- Discharge
  - location: Bèze
  - average: 3.89 cubic metres per second (137 cu ft/s)

Basin features
- Progression: Saône→ Rhône→ Mediterranean Sea
- Tributaries
  - left: Chiron, Pannecul
  - right: Albane

The Bèze (French pronunciation: [bɛz]) is a French river in the Côte-d'Or department, in the Bourgogne-Franche-Comté region. It is a right tributary of the Saône, and thus a sub-tributary of the Rhône.

The river rises in the Crétanne cave in the village of Bèze, then crosses several communes in its 31.2 kilometres (19.4 mi) course before entering the Saône in Vonges. Its source is the outlet of a vast underground network fed by the Tille and the Venelle. A walk has been laid out around the spring, which is a major tourist attraction in the region.

The watershed of the Bèze river and its main tributary, the Albane, irrigates the Saône Vingeanne country, over a total area of 250 square kilometres (97 sq mi) Along its course the landscape alternates between forested areas and areas of large crops, livestock meadows and ponds. The basin is home to four natural areas of interest for their ecology, fauna and flora.

Human occupation along the river began as early as the Paleolithic. In Roman Gaul the sanctuary of Mirebeau-sur-Bèze, on an important axis of communication, was an important place in the region. The site was occupied by the Legio VIII Augusta, who built an imposing military camp. In the Middle Ages the river saw the foundation of the Abbaye Saint-Pierre de Bèze, a gathering place for the pilgrimage of Saint Prudent de Narbonne. In the modern era the Poudrerie nationale de Vonges was founded at the mouth of the Bèze, which it used for industrial purposes. It remains an important heritage building on the water.

The fauna and flora are similar to those associated with the Saône ecosystem, with a predominance of trout. Many hydraulic structures, however, have a strong impact on the river species. The water quality of the Bèze and its tributaries is considered mediocre due to nitrates from agricultural and livestock activities along the river's course. The Bèze and its watershed do not present any major natural hazards.

== Geography and description ==
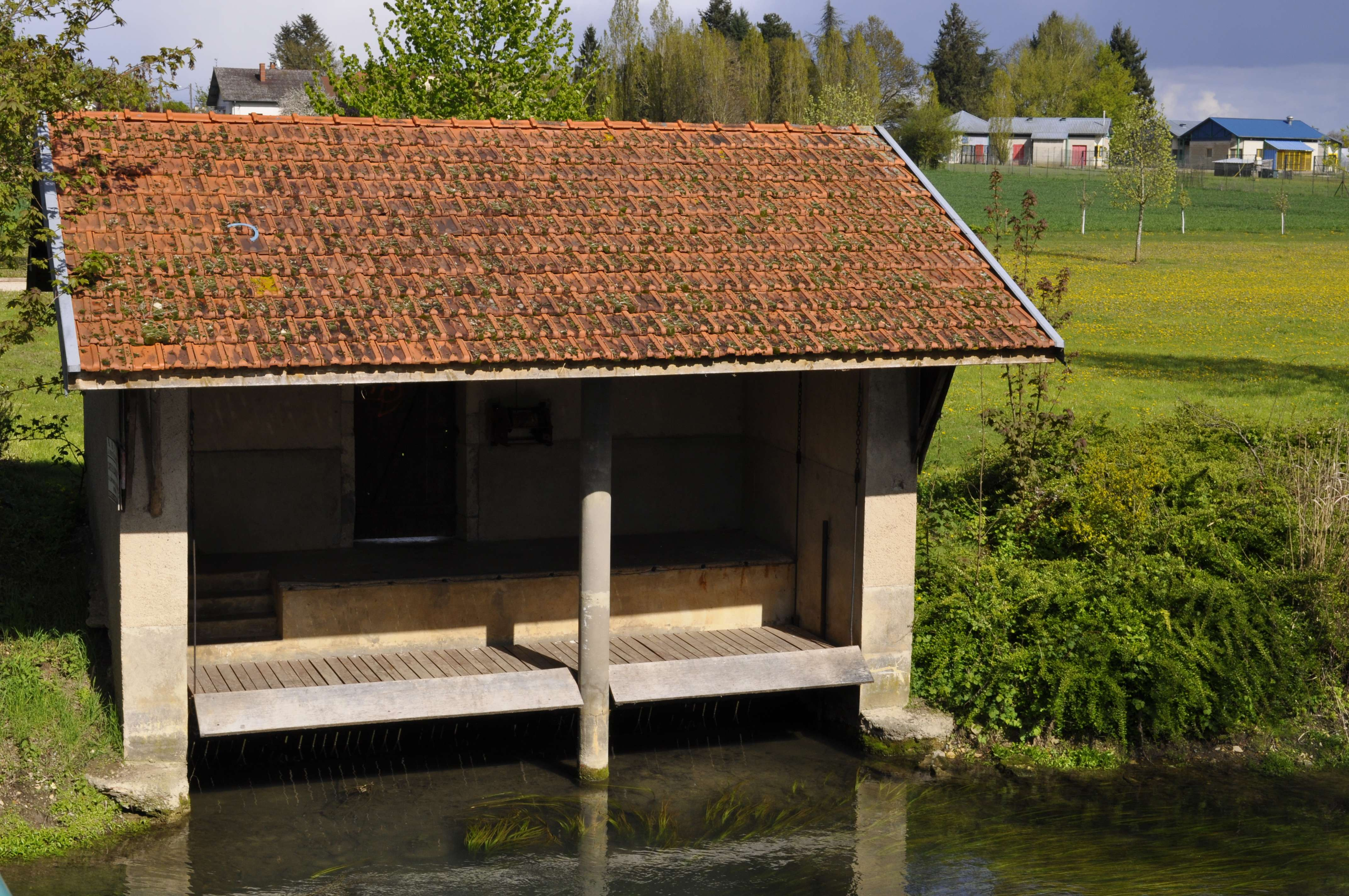
Washing station on the Bèze in Bézouotte.

The source of the Bèze is 25 kilometres (16 mi) north-east of Dijon in the Bèze village at an altitude of 208 metres (682 ft). It rises from a basin at the foot of the Kimmeridgian limestones and immediately forms a river 10 metres (33 ft) wide. Other sources, connected with the underground river discovered in 1950 by the Dijon Speleo-Club, originate under the old cemetery of Bèze 400 metres (1,300 ft) downstream. The river then travels 31.2 kilometres (19.4 mi) in a southeasterly direction to discharge into the Saône, of which it is a tributary on the right bank, in the commune of Vonges, at an altitude of 184 metres (604 ft) of altitude, where it is 20 metres (66 ft) wide. Its average slope is 0.9%.

La Bèze flows through the center of the "Bèze-Albane" catchment basin in the heart of the Saône Vingeanne country, in the department of Côte-d'Or, with a total area of 250 square kilometres (97 sq mi). The river is characterized by its source in Bèze, a remarkable spring fueled by a large underground network. Its watershed contains three tributaries and is bounded on the south by its confluence with the Saône.

=== Sources ===
==== Location ====
The Bèze in Côte-d'Or.

The source of the Bèze is one of the most important karst springs in metropolitan France. The river originates in an underground lake in a cave called La Crétanne in the immediate vicinity of the agglomeration of Bèze, in Côte-d'Or, at the foot of a cliff overlooking the spring, in the basin called "la douy". (Note: In Burgundy the word "douy", or "douix", means "karst spring".) The lake is discharged into the open through a tunnel similar to the Fontaine de Vaucluse. The tunnel, called the Salle Blanc (White Room), is 40 by 8 metres (131 by 26 ft) with a 3 metres (9.8 ft) ceiling, and can be entered by a small staircase at the foot of the cliff. The well-known La Crétanne cave is 45 metres (148 ft) underground. It is about 650 metres (2,130 ft) long, with four upstream tunnels and one downstream tunnel, the source of the Bèze.

==== Underground network ====
The underground network of the Bèze extends over 2,800 metres (9,200 ft), with a vertical drop of 26 metres (85 ft). The source of the Bèze, the outlet of this hydraulic network, is the most important karst spring of the Côte-d'Or department. The Crétanne cave is the best explored part of this vast network.

The underground network of Bèze consists of four sumps, or underground water channels:

- The source of the Bèze sump was prospected by the S.C. Dijon (Speleo Club de Dijon) and the S.C. Paris for the first time on 25 October 1953 along 30 metres (98 ft) and a depth of 10 metres (33 ft). In 1972 the SHAG explored about 70 metres (230 ft) more and then the S.C. Dijon, in 1974, reached the junction with the cave by crossing this sump of 140 metres (460 ft), which proved to be prolonged by side annexes, including a very dangerous downstream duct, for a total of 290 metres (950 ft).
- The pier sump (or sump 1) was unclogged in 1964, 1966 and 1967. The entrance was cleared during the year 1968. The embedded conduit between two strata runs for 90 metres (300 ft). It ends in a flooded well constituting the junction of several galleries. The main one was explored in 1975 up to 370 metres (1,210 ft) from the entrance and to a depth of 16 metres (52 ft). The junction with the Lac Blanc sump was reached in 1976. In 1976 a secondary downstream gallery, beginning 90 metres (300 ft) from the entrance, extended for 105 metres (344 ft) and then emerged into a dry area.
- The Lac Blanc sump (or sump 2) was discovered in 1953 by the S.C. Dijon and the S.C. Paris and then explored for 100 metres (330 ft) in a slightly immersed gallery to a submerged shaft at a depth of 14 metres (46 ft). Ancillary sumps, close to the entrance, were explored to about 50 metres (160 ft). In 1976 the main water supply was located 50 metres (160 ft) from the entrance, the "Puits de la Chaussette". The junction with the pier sump was formed by a fracture 30 metres (98 ft) long and 10 metres (33 ft) high. A bell-shaped cavity was then discovered 230 metres (750 ft) from the entrance. Three extensions were explored in 1978 and 1979: a very narrow crack surfaced in a small duct terminated by a flooded crack, a vast flooded chimney and a small upper network.
- The sumps of the scree gallery (or sumps 3 and 4) have no apparent current and contain many clay deposits. The first measures 150 metres (490 ft) and the second 40 metres (130 ft).

==== Geology ====
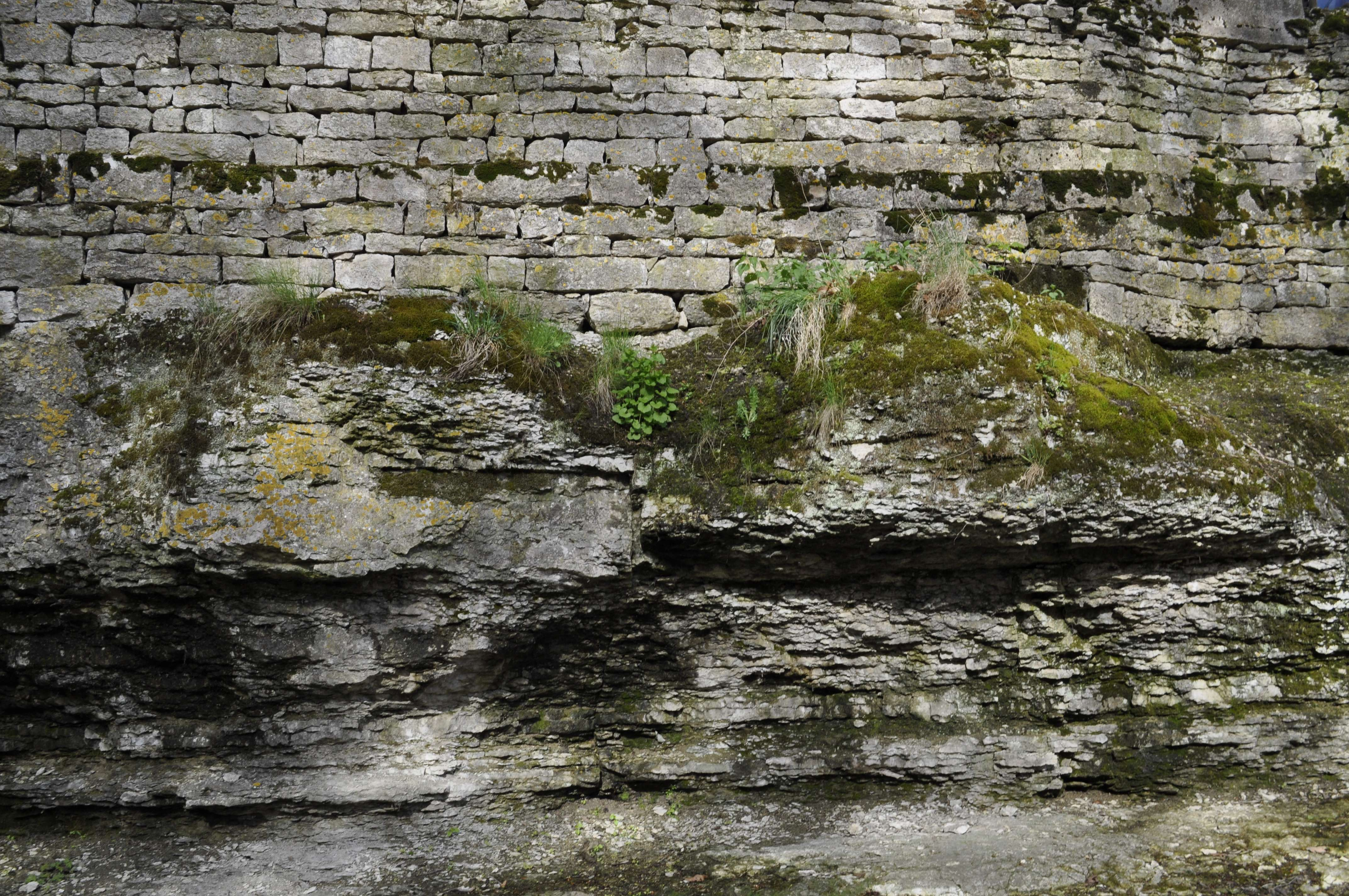
Detail of the cliff that overlooks the upwelling at Bèze

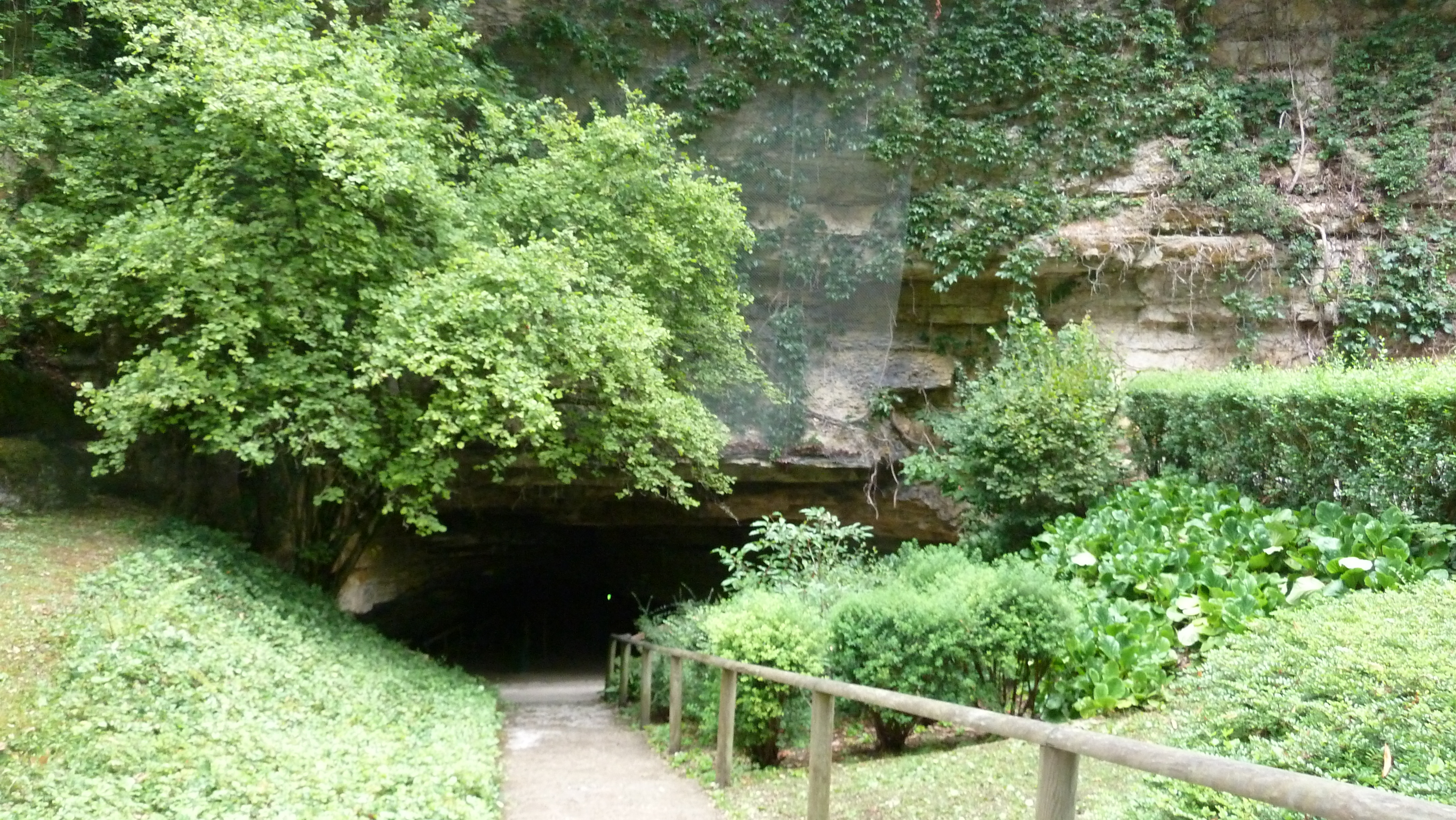
Entrance to the Bèze cave

The Crétanne cave is made of limestone. The set of galleries that constitutes the underground Bèze river have developed in layers of limestones that are not very thick (10 to 15 centimetres (3.9 to 5.9 in) on average) and were formed in the upper part of the Oxfordian or Astartian areas. This formation overlays a thick mass of limestone of quite variable nature from the Rauracian and Sequanian ages, with thickness of over 100 metres (330 ft), which constitutes the basement of the limestone plateaus to the north of Bèze.

The source is covered by limestone and marl of the Kimmeridgian age, which form a small cuesta visible to the southeast of the village of Bèze, under the compact limestone of the Portland Group. The ceiling of the cave is covered with kaolinite while the walls are covered with manganese oxide in some places. The set of galleries has a slight but steady incline towards the south, where it is covered by patches of Cretaceous rocks and then by the Tertiary sediments of La Bresse. The karst in the region must have been established either at the end of the Oligocene, or during the Miocene.

The galleries of the Bèze cave are parallel to the stratification of the layers. They are wide, with flat roofs that corresponds to the base surface of the limestone beds. It seems that are several levels of galleries. The highest are visible at the base of the first room and are all clogged. The main galleries contain a number of vertical chimneys that could have been formed as a result of upward erosion by water under pressure. The galleries are oriented in two directions. The principal gallery is oriented a few degrees east of north, parallel to the direction of the tectonic faults and the main joints of the region). The second is essentially perpendicular to the previous one and also corresponds to a joint direction.

The sediments of the Bèze cave were the subject of detailed study in the proceedings of the 1st International Congress of Speleology. The filling mud consists of siliceous sands identical to the albian sands found further south of the Bèze. The sands indicate the existence of the basin of an underground river of an old albian cover that has now disappeared. In addition, the greatest part of the filler consists of fine sand and silt that is increasingly fine towards the top of the series. Several cycles of sedimentation separated by calcite floors can be observed. Finally, varves are present in the upper galleries, formed during flooding, which are separated by darker layers and particles of finer size, deposited during periods of low water.

==== Hydrology at source ====
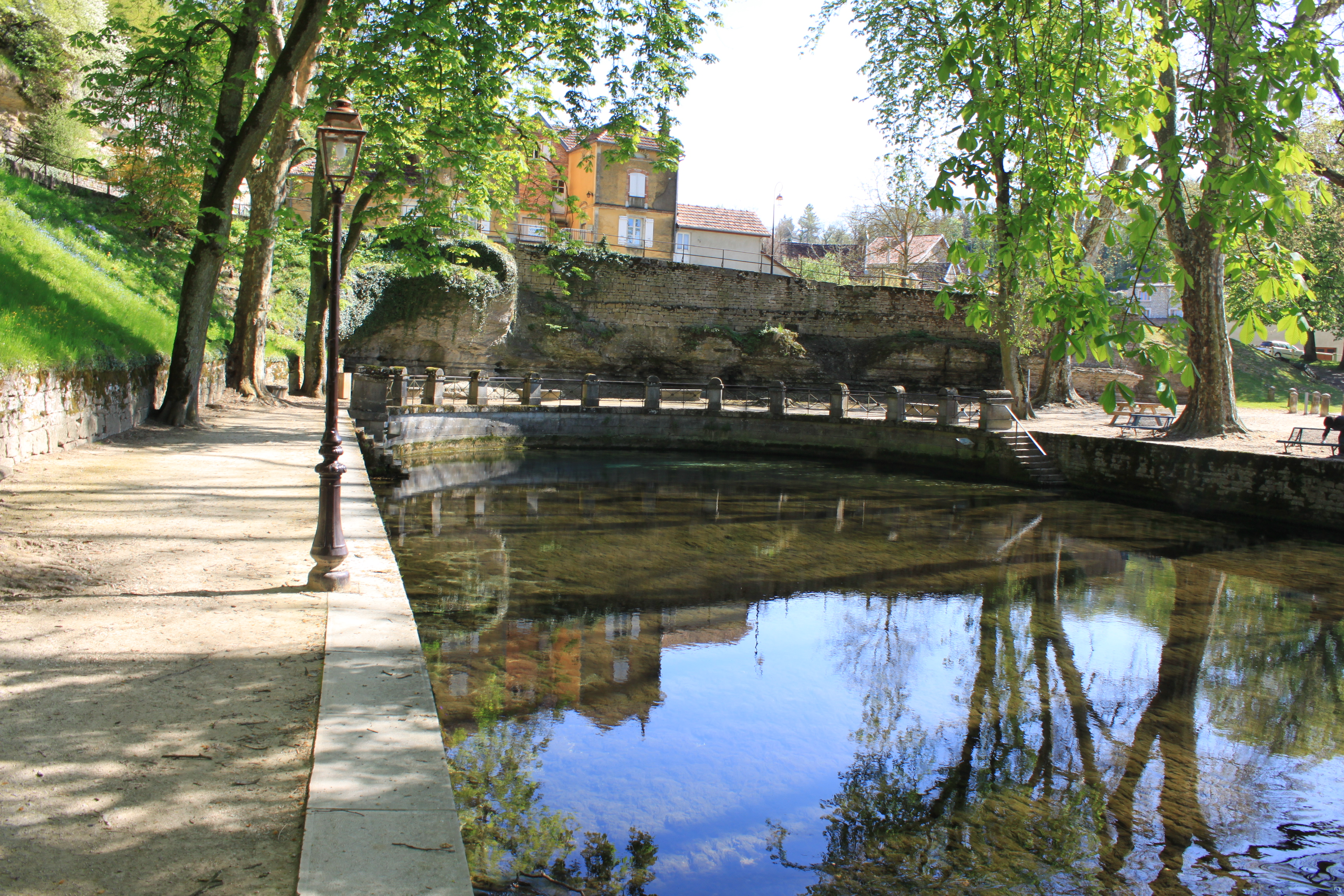
View of the karst spring in Bèze and the walkway around it

The source of the Bèze consists of two openings:

- The first, at the southern end of the underground river, where the water comes almost vertically through a sump obstructed by large collapsed blocks
- The second, the main opening, is about 160 metres (520 ft) further north at the end of the Salle Blanc. The flow is greater than in the other outlet due to the presence of a sump. The Speleo Clubs of Dijon and Paris undertook penetration tests which showed the existence upstream of flooded galleries and then an almost vertical well of 15 metres (49 ft) in depth leading to more flooded galleries.

A sump to drain the waters of the underground river is a short distance from the first water outlet, about 100 metres (330 ft) from the Bèze karst spring, but is insufficient to drain all the waters during flood periods.

The average annual flow of the river at Bèze is 4 cubic metres per second (140 cu ft/s). There are significant variations, with the low flow rate around 0.5 cubic metres per second (18 cu ft/s) and the maximum at times of flood reaching 20 to 25 cubic metres per second (710 to 880 cu ft/s). The flow of the Bèze at its source was observed during a period of 27 years from 1981 to 2012 at the station in Bèze called the "Ferme de Rome" .

==== Origin of the waters ====
The river originates in an upwelling of the waters of the aquifer under the forest of Velours in the commune of Lux, Côte-d'Or. This is fed by water from the Tille and Venelle rivers. The Speleo-Club of Dijon has explored the source since 14 July 1950. Exploration continues today by scuba diving and by systematic study of the discovered network. H. Tintant says that most of the waters of the Bèze come from underground drainage of the immense karst plateau consisting of rauracian and sequanian limestones forming a quadrilateral limited to the north by the impenetrable Argovian marls from Crécey-sur-Tille to Occey and the valley of the Vingeanne. Covered by dry valleys and perforated with numerous funnels (several hundred in the Velours forest alone), this plateau, which measures more than 225 square kilometres (87 sq mi), is covered with very permeable rocks with a small but discernible slope to the south. The underground river feeding the Bèze at its source probably collects 50% of the annual rainfall on the plateau.

Fluorescein tests carried out by the Speleo-Club of Dijon in 1970 showed that the waters of Venelle colored those of the Bèze in the caves of the spring.

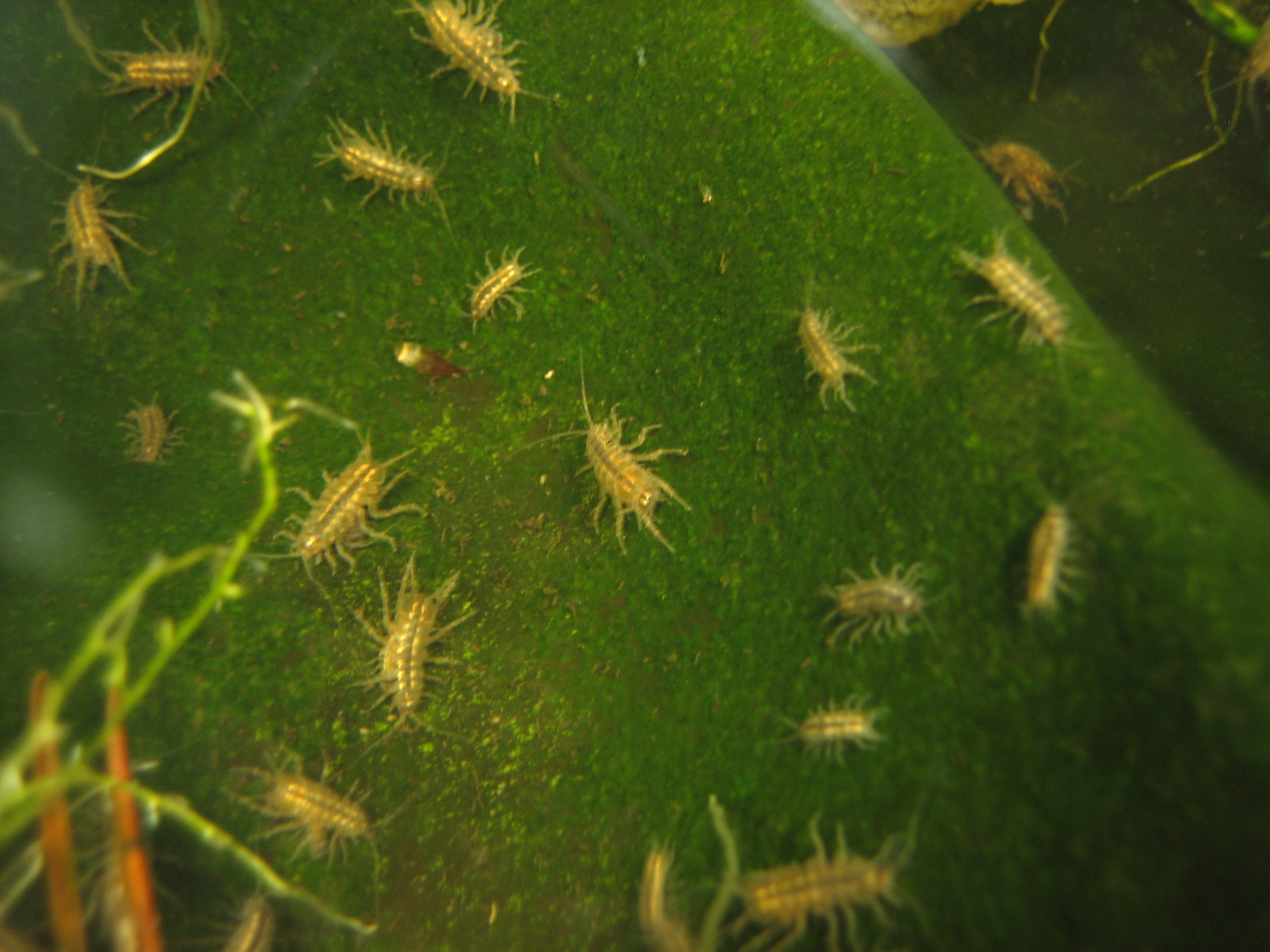
Asellus aquaticus endemic to the Bèze cave

==== Fauna and flora ====
The Bèze cave is home to an endemic species, the Burgundy Asellus aquaticus, a freshwater species studied in 1969 by J.-P. Henry and G. Magniez. The underground river is home to crustaceans such as niphargus. Fish such as minnow, sculpin and trout can sometimes be found in one of the sumps. There are five species of bats. The flora is composed of ferns that have colonized the geological chimneys. Various types of moss and some fungi can also be observed.

==== The spring ====
The Bèze spring is at the point where the Sequanian limestone plateau dips under the more clayey or Kimmeridgian cuesta, which is similar to many Châtillonnais springs at the foot of the Aargau cuesta.

The geographer François Robert wrote in 1789 that the Bèze spring is one of the four most significant in France. The spring is the most photographed place in Bèze. Some postcard publishers do not hesitate to improve the picture by scratching the glass plate negative for a more impressive outpouring. The walk at the source around the spring is a monument historique site with construction dated to the 18th century and trees that are 200 to 300 years old.

==== Development ====
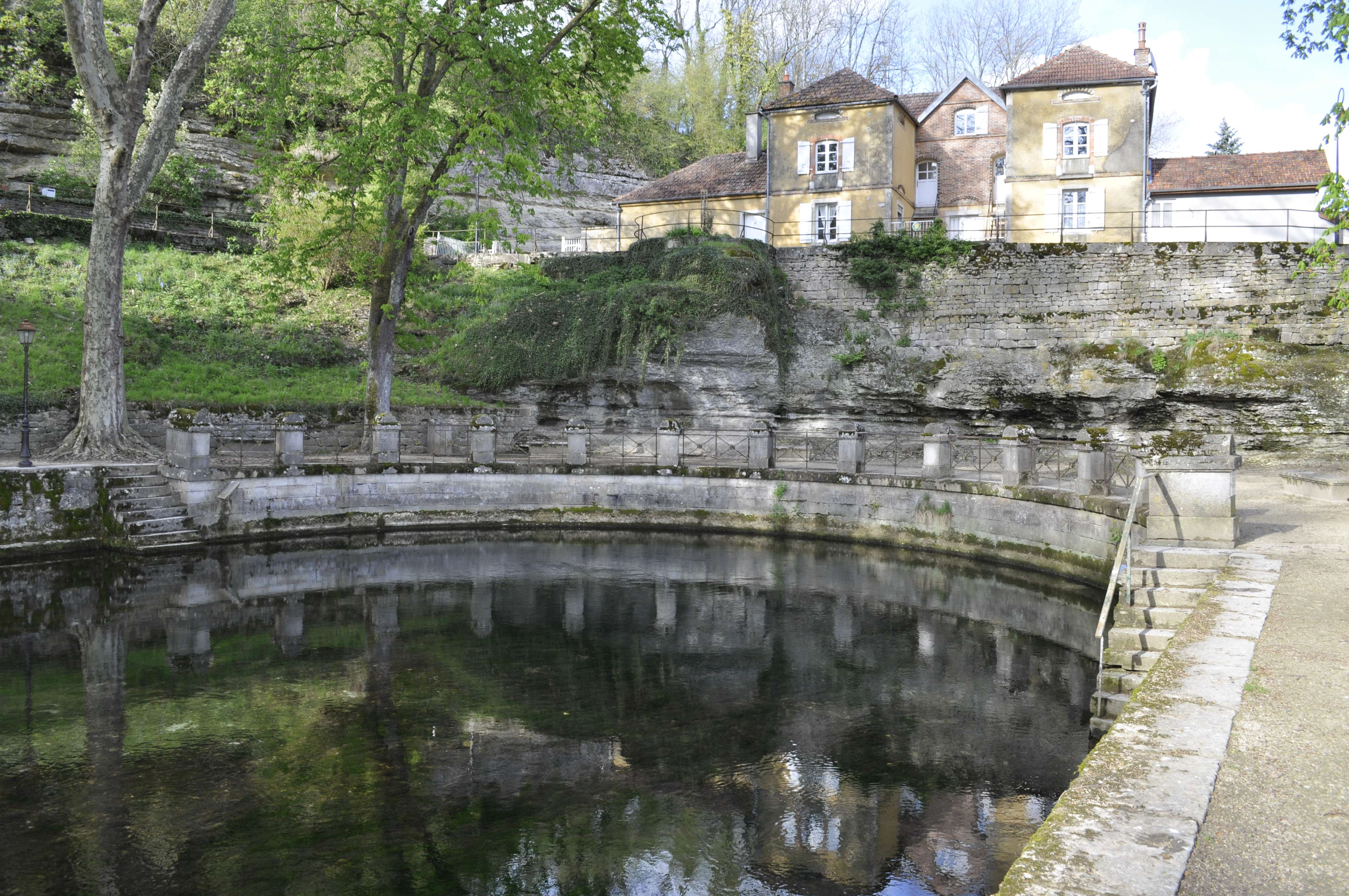
The walkway around the Bèze spring

In 1970 the municipality of Bèze and its mayor, Robert Poinsot, decided to develop the cave, which is the property of the commune, for tourism. It opened to visitors in April 1971.

The caves can be visited by boat over a distance of about 300 metres (980 ft) on the underground lake at a temperature of 12 °C (54 °F). The numerous stalactites and stalagmites with singular forms such as drapes, sombreros or shells are among the attractions of one of the most important tourist sites of the Dijon region. The number of visitors is constantly increasing: 14,390 in 2007, 16,255 in 2008, 18,224 in 2009, 19,341 in 2010 and 20,193 in 2011.

Famous stalactites named "Bèze andouilles" (Bèze noodles), referring to the local gastronomy, fell during a flood. The most admired stalactite is the "elephant ear". Three professional guides escort visitors in boats without motors which are moved by a network of ropes installed on the roof of the cave.

The cave is regularly used for training firemen of Dijon and also Paris, and even for the army.

=== Bèze-Albane basin ===
==== Description ====
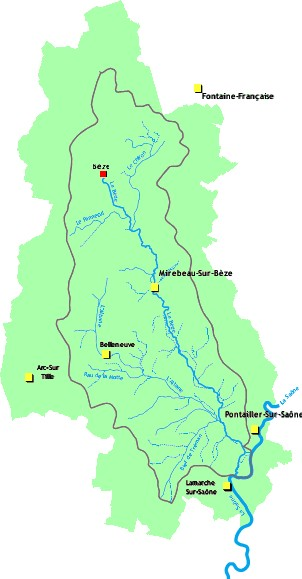
Map of the river basin (green shading).

The Bèze-Albane catchment area has a continental climate exactly the same as that of Dijon. Summer rains are often stormy since uneven heating of the ground increases the convective phenomena. Winters are wet and relatively harsh, and rarely pass without snowfall.

The geology of the basin is composed, at its head, of limestone formations of the secondary era. The center-west of the basin, from Noiron-sur-Bèze to the source of Albane, consists of secondary formations of the Cretaceous and earlier tertiary formations of the Pliocene. The Cretaceous series forms a monocline with a slight southwest dip where the Cenomanian-Turonian chalk forms a layer above the Albian clays. It typically forms rounded hills. The lowland valleys of the Albane and Bèze consist of recent carbonate alluvium in the Bèze basin but clayey-silty soil in the Albane basin. The upstream part of the Bèze basin is fed by an important karst network replenished in part by losses from the Tille and the Venelle rivers. Some rainwater supplies these aquifers. The source of the Bèze is the outlet of this important network.

==== Body of Water ====
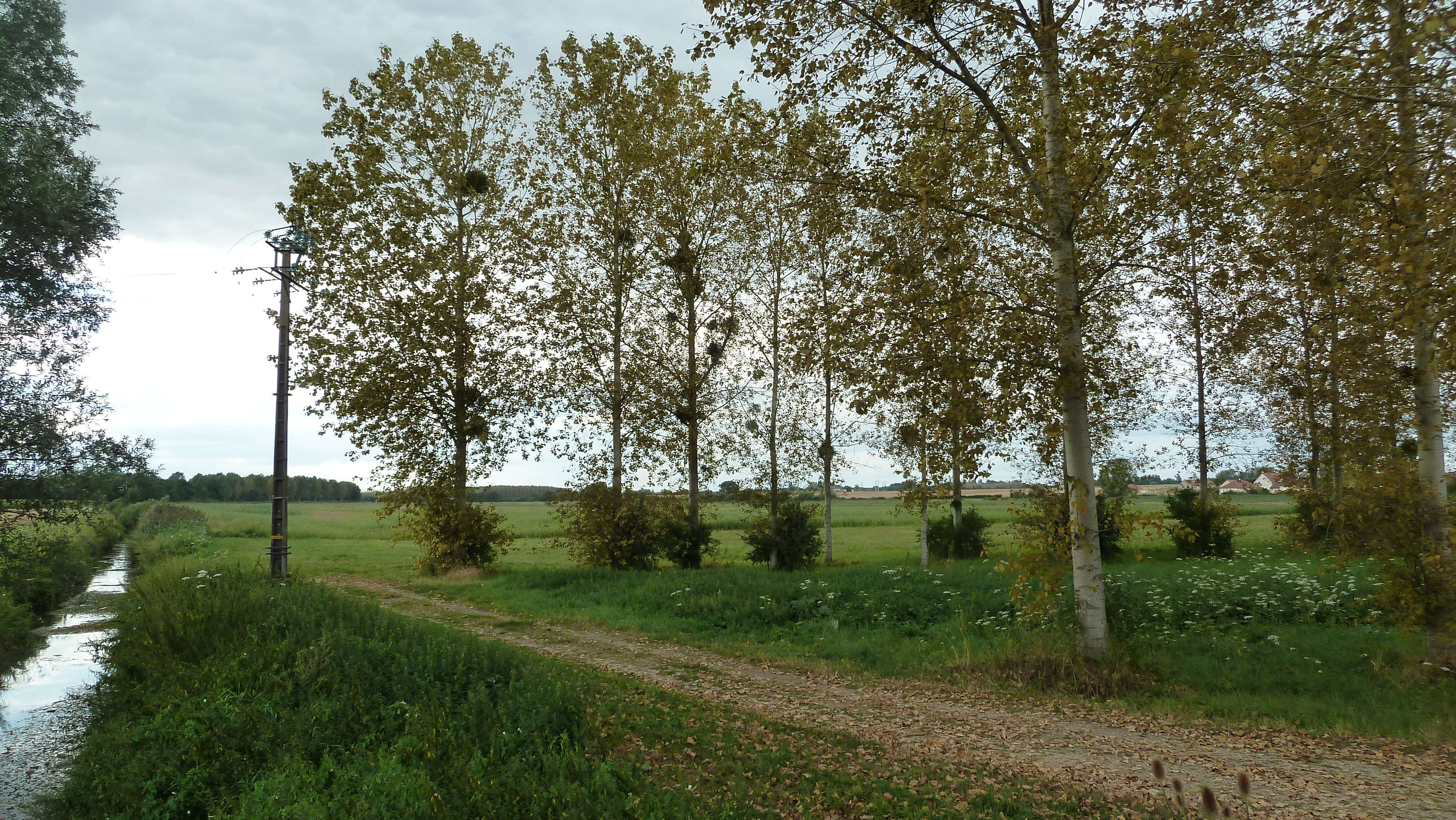
There are many poplar plantations. This one is on the banks of the Albane in Saint-Léger-Triey.

Located in the Rhône basin, the Bèze-Albane catchment area covers an area of 250 square kilometres (97 sq mi). It has a length of 95 kilometres (59 mi) of which 30 kilometres (19 mi) is the bed of the Bèze. The main tributaries of the Bèze are the 17 kilometres (11 mi) Albane, 8 kilometres (5.0 mi) Chiron and 6 kilometres (3.7 mi) Pannecul. Several studies have shown that the topographic watershed in the commune of Bèze, which is only 32.6 square kilometres (12.6 sq mi), is at the center of a larger hydrological network, between 225 and 890 square kilometres (87 and 344 sq mi), probably 400 square kilometres (150 sq mi). The highest land has an elevation of about 300 metres (980 ft) at the head of the basin.

The Bèze-Albane basin is almost entirely rural, with only 2.1% of the area built up. Forests and fields account for more than 95% of the territory, with twice as much cropland as forest. Grasslands are hardly present, covering 5.5% of the basin and 8.6% of the agricultural land. The main crops are cereals and oilseeds. Woods and forests are numerous in the basin and represent a significant part of the land. The largest wooded areas include the forest of the Mirebeau domain, Bèze wood, Popin wood, Varve wood, Pont Bourdin wood and the Vervotte forest. There are also large poplar plantations, especially in the lower valleys, notably at Belleneuve, Mirebeau, and Saint-Léger. Some grasslands have disappeared over time, in favor of arable crops. These were traditionally present near streams, as shown by the names of farm lots along the Bèze and Albane on detailed IGN maps.

==== Hydrology ====
Topographic map of the Bèze

The Bèze has moderate seasonal fluctuations in flow, with higher rainfall in winter bringing the average monthly flow rate to between 4.5 and 5.65 cubic metres per second (159 and 200 cu ft/s) from December to March inclusive, with a maximum in January. Starting in March the monthly flow rate gradually drops to the low summer levels from July to September, with a monthly average flow rate down to 1.76 cubic metres per second (62 cu ft/s) in August. However, the minimum flow for 3 consecutive days of the month can drop to 0.9 cubic metres per second (32 cu ft/s) during a dry five-year period. The average flow over the year is 3.810 cubic metres per second (134.5 cu ft/s). The level of the river does not begin to rise slowly until after five or six days of continuous rainfall.

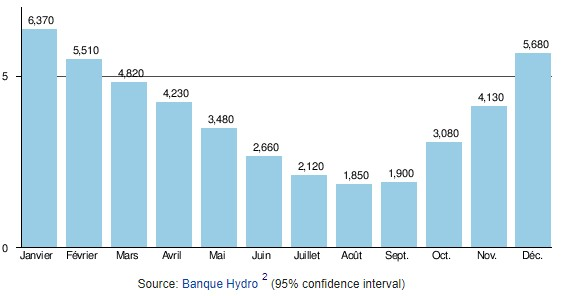
Average monthly flow m3/s as of 2012 at the Bèze hydrological station

Flooding is never very significant since the river benefits from the regulating effect of the large underground water table. The instantaneous flow for peak flood is 13 cubic metres per second (460 cu ft/s) and the maximum for a five-year flood is 16 cubic metres per second (570 cu ft/s). This rises to 17 cubic metres per second (600 cu ft/s) for a ten-year period, 19 cubic metres per second (670 cu ft/s) or a 20-year period and 20 cubic metres per second (710 cu ft/s) for a fifty-year period. The greatest instantaneous flow recorded was 17.8 cubic metres per second (630 cu ft/s) on 18 December 1982, and the greatest daily average was 17.3 cubic metres per second (610 cu ft/s) on 21 December 1982. This flood was lower than the 20 year level, so was by no means exceptional. It might be expected every 15 years on average.

The amount of water that runs off the Bèze basin (rainfall less evaporation / absorption) is estimated at 308 millimetres (12.1 in) annually, which is moderately high but of the same order of magnitude as France as a whole, but less than that of the Saône river basin, which has 501 millimetres (19.7 in) annually. The specific flow reaches 9.7 litres per second (128 imp gal/min) per square kilometer of the basin.

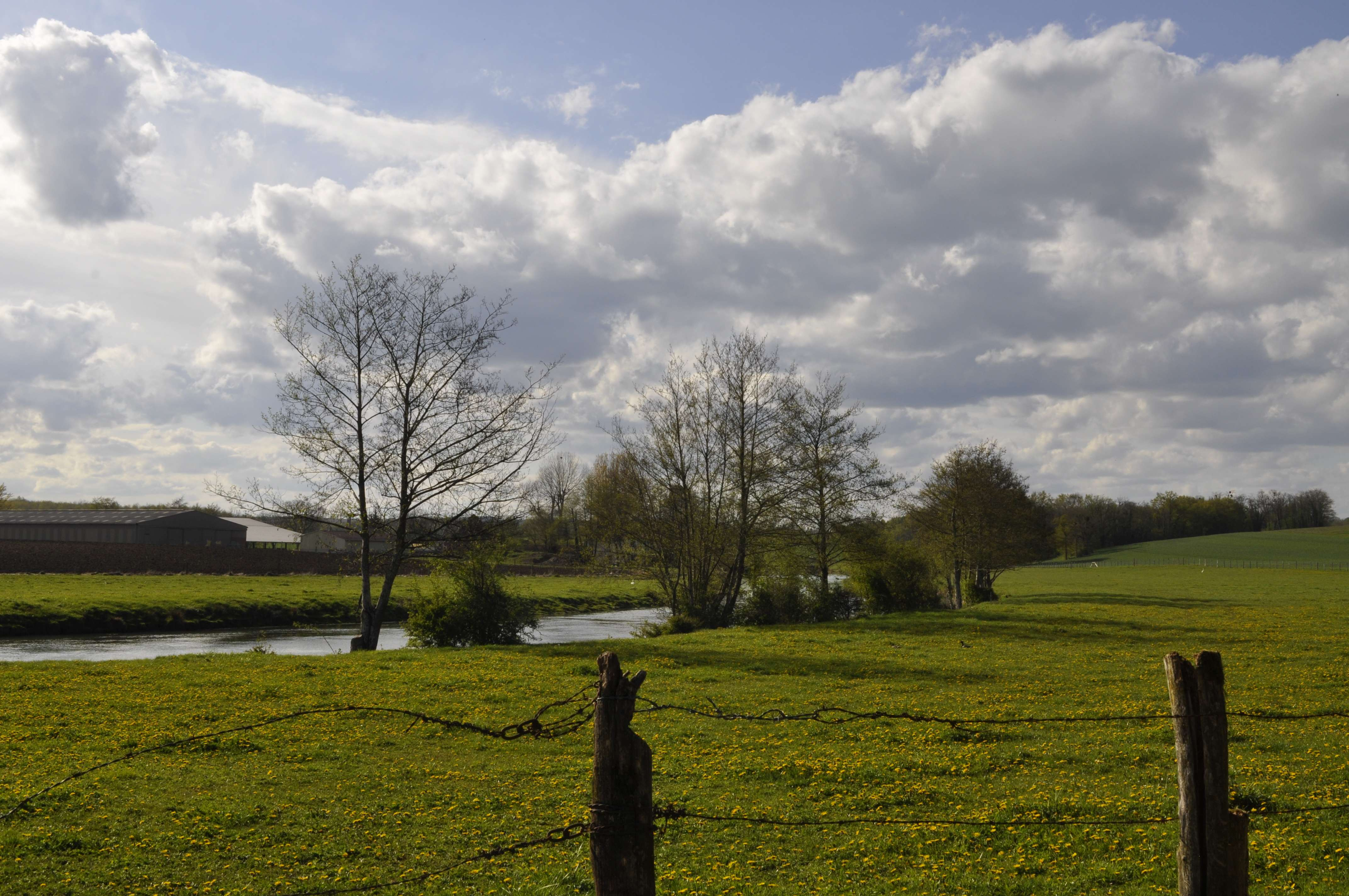
Landscape of plains and groves, at Noiron-sur-Bèze

==== Landscapes ====
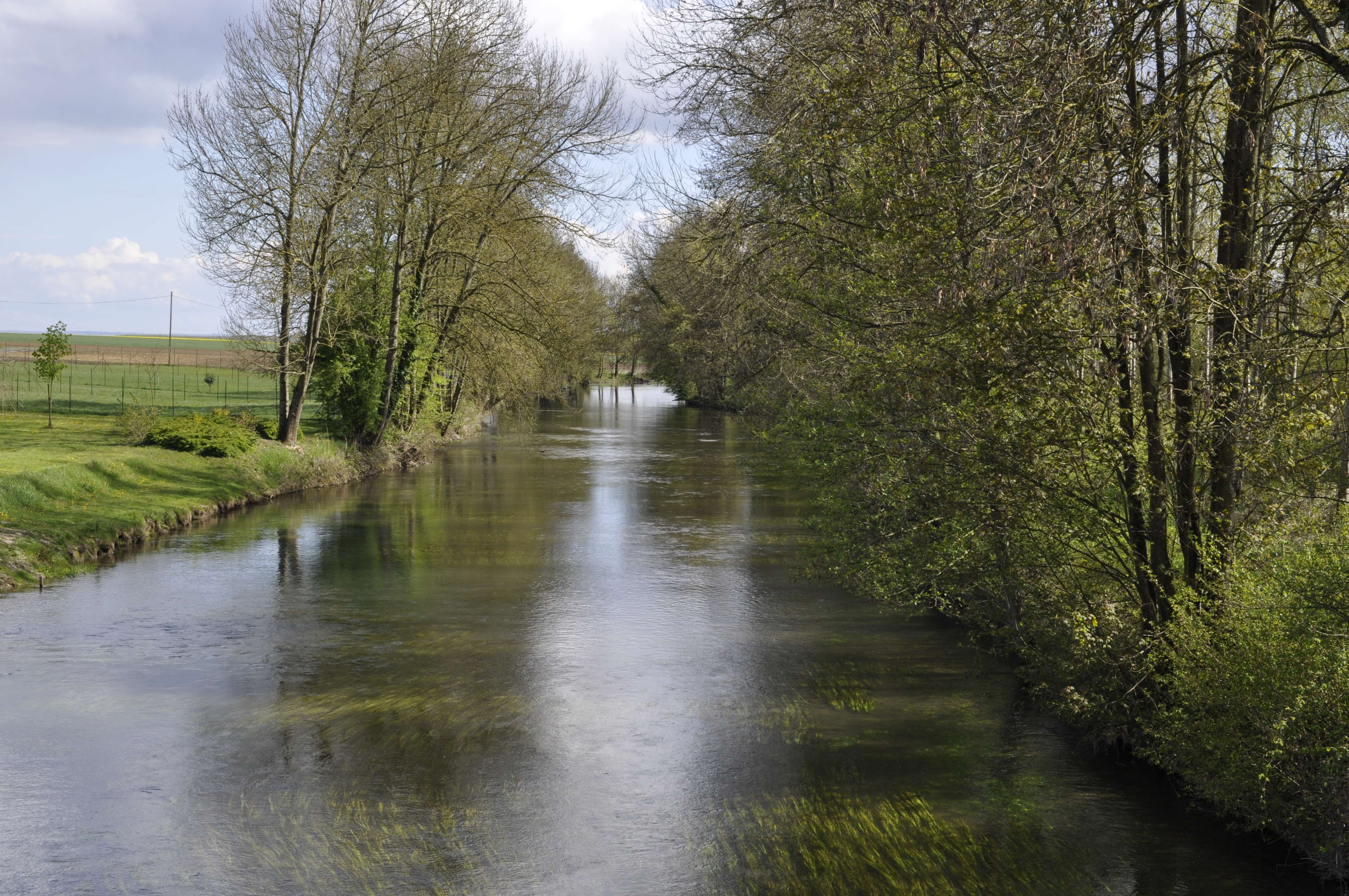
Course of La Bèze in Bézouotte

The vegetation is mixed, with a marked contrast between the forest and arable land. Reliefs are also mixed with more rolling hills in the northwest of the basin in the communes of Viévigne, Tanay, Belleneuve and in the area of Noiron-sur-Bèze, Chevigny-Saint-Sauveur, Bèze and Bourberain. The water courses are more enclosed and the woods and villages are often on the hills.

The watershed comprises four main types of Zone naturelle d'intérêt écologique, faunistique et floristique (ZNIEFF):

- Type II ZNIEFF #260015037, Velours and Fontaine-Française forests, spanning the territories of Lux, Bourberain, Tanay, Bèze and Viévigne.
- Type II ZNIEFF #260015026, Bèze valley holding all the land near Bèze river in the communes of Bèze and Vonges, including the Mirebeau domain forest
- Type II ZNIEFF #260015020, Longchamp forest, spanning the municipalities of Étevaux, Saint-Léger-Triey, Lamarche-sur-Saône and Longchamp.

Type I ZNIEFF#00550001) is included in the Longchamp forest and covers the lake of Saint-Léger-Triey ("The Big Pond")

- Type II ZNIEFF #260015009, Saône valley from Vonges to Auxonne.

Type 1 ZNIEFF # 00340001 is in the ZNIEFF II Saône valley from Pontailler-sur-Saône to Auxonne.

==== Tributaries and bodies of water ====
Four bodies of surface water are present in the Bèze catchment: Bèze, Albane, Chiron and Pannecul, as well as three bodies of groundwater: The main tributary of the Bèze is the Albane, which enters the Bèze on the right bank at Saint-Léger-Triey. The Bèze also receives water from Chaume-et-Courchamp, 12 kilometres (7.5 mi) north-west of Bèze in the canton of Fontaine-Française. This subterranean link was demonstrated by Speleo-Club of Dijon in 1955, following a sudden rise of muddy waters in the Bèze and then an exploration of the cavities.

There are four minor springs in the catchment area apart from that of the Bèze: the Albane spring at Magny-Saint-Médard, the Creux de Vau spring at Mirebeau-sur-Bèze, the Fontaine du Gué spring at Noiron-sur-Bèze and the small springs of Tanay.

==== Bèze valley ====
The upstream part of the Bèze valley is made of limestone formations of the Jurassic. From Noiron-sur-Bèze, limestone gradually gives way to marl. The valley covers an area of 2,660 hectares (6,600 acres). The Bèze crosses twelve municipalities, all located in Côte-d'Or: Bèze, Noiron-sur-Bèze, Mirebeau-sur-Bèze, Bézouotte, Cuiserey, Charmes, Marandeuil, Drambon, Tanay, Saint-Léger-Triey, Vonges and Pontailler-sur-Saône. The basin crosses seven cantons and seven communities of communes, or a total of 41 communes. There are 16,861 inhabitants, or 33.7 inhabitants per square kilometer. Five communes have more than 1,000 inhabitants in the basin: Mirebeau-sur-Bèze, Belleneuve, Arc-sur-Tille, Pontailler-sur-Saône and Lamarche-sur-Saône.

In Charmes, the land of springs, fountains and water ditches of the Bèze basin, the water is flush with the soil so that the inhabitants of the region name the place "the fishpond" . It is in fact the moat of an old castle. There the Bèze is fed into a small stream, the Gailloux. In Savolles, even though the Bèze does not cross the territory of this municipality, a reserve of water in case of fire was created on the ridge line between the Bèze and the Albane, filled in the 1950s during the erection of the water tower.

==== Albane valley ====
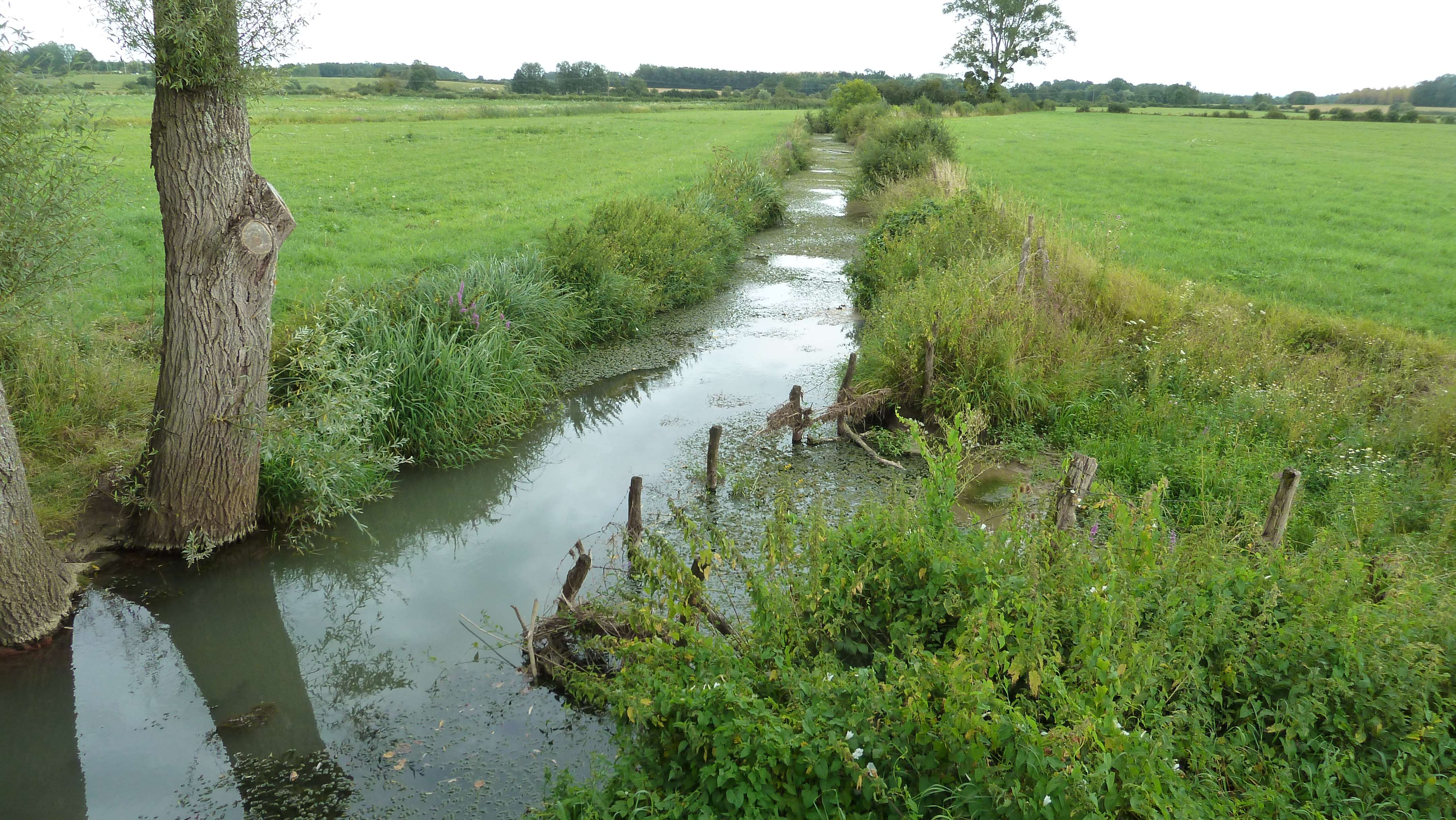
The Albane at Saint-Léger-Triey, towards Vonges. The river joins the Bèze 1 kilometre (0.62 mi) to southeast.

The Albane valley (or "Albanne" according to Badin and Quantin 1847) has clay-marl soil. The Albane takes its source at the place called "La Ferme de l'Albane" in the commune of Magny-Saint-Médard. It flows for 17 kilometres (11 mi) before reaching the Bèze in Saint-Léger-Triey a few kilometers before the confluence with the Saône. It crosses the municipalities of Magny-Saint-Médard, Savolles, Belleneuve, Binges, Trochères, Étevaux, Marandeuil, Drambon, Saint-Léger-Triey, Pontailler-sur-Saône and Lamarche-sur-Saône.

==== Economic and tourism activities ====
There are seven Approved Associations for Fishing and Protection of Aquatic Environments (AAPPMA: Associations agréées de pêche et de protection des milieux aquatiques) which cover three quarters of the catchment area. Fishing is, however, a declining practice and the main activity practiced by these associations is stocking. Fish farming is practiced in many artificial ponds. The Bessey, Noiron, Rougeot, Drambon and Marandeuil ponds are on the Bèze, and the Bouques, Pierre, Grand, Maladière and Bergerie ponds are on the Albane. The only hydroelectric production is one turbine at the outfall at Drambon.

Most tourist activity is in the communes of Mirebeau-sur-Bèze and Pontailler-sur-Saône, both green holiday resorts. Walking trails, part of the circuit of the Val de Vingeanne, let visitors discover Bèze and its surroundings.

== Human occupation ==
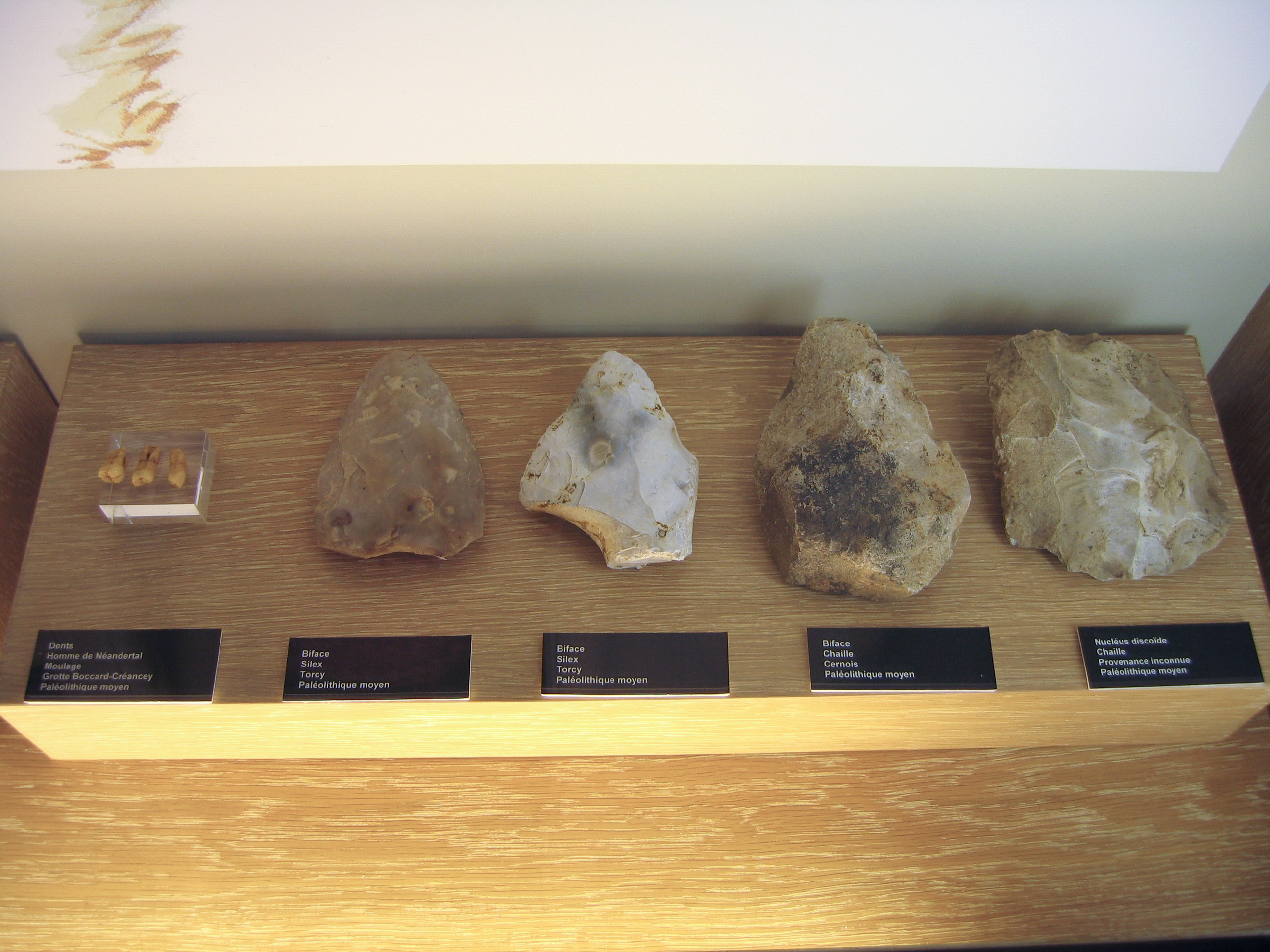
Examples of bifaces found in Burgundy, similar to those found at Bèze, in the Musée archéologique de Dijon

=== Paleolithic ===
The La Roncière site in Bèze has often been researched. Remains from the Lower Paleolithic and Middle Paleolithic to the Gallo-Roman period were discovered, including stones broken to produce chips or blades of the "Orville" type, showing that the site was occupied in the middle Magdalenian period. There seem to be signs of two other occupations, one in the Aurignacian and the other in the upper Périgordian.

Remains of prehistoric animals are present at the entrance of the cave Crétanne such as teeth of mammoths and remains of woolly rhinoceros and hipparion.

=== Ancient site at Mirebeau-sur-Bèze ===
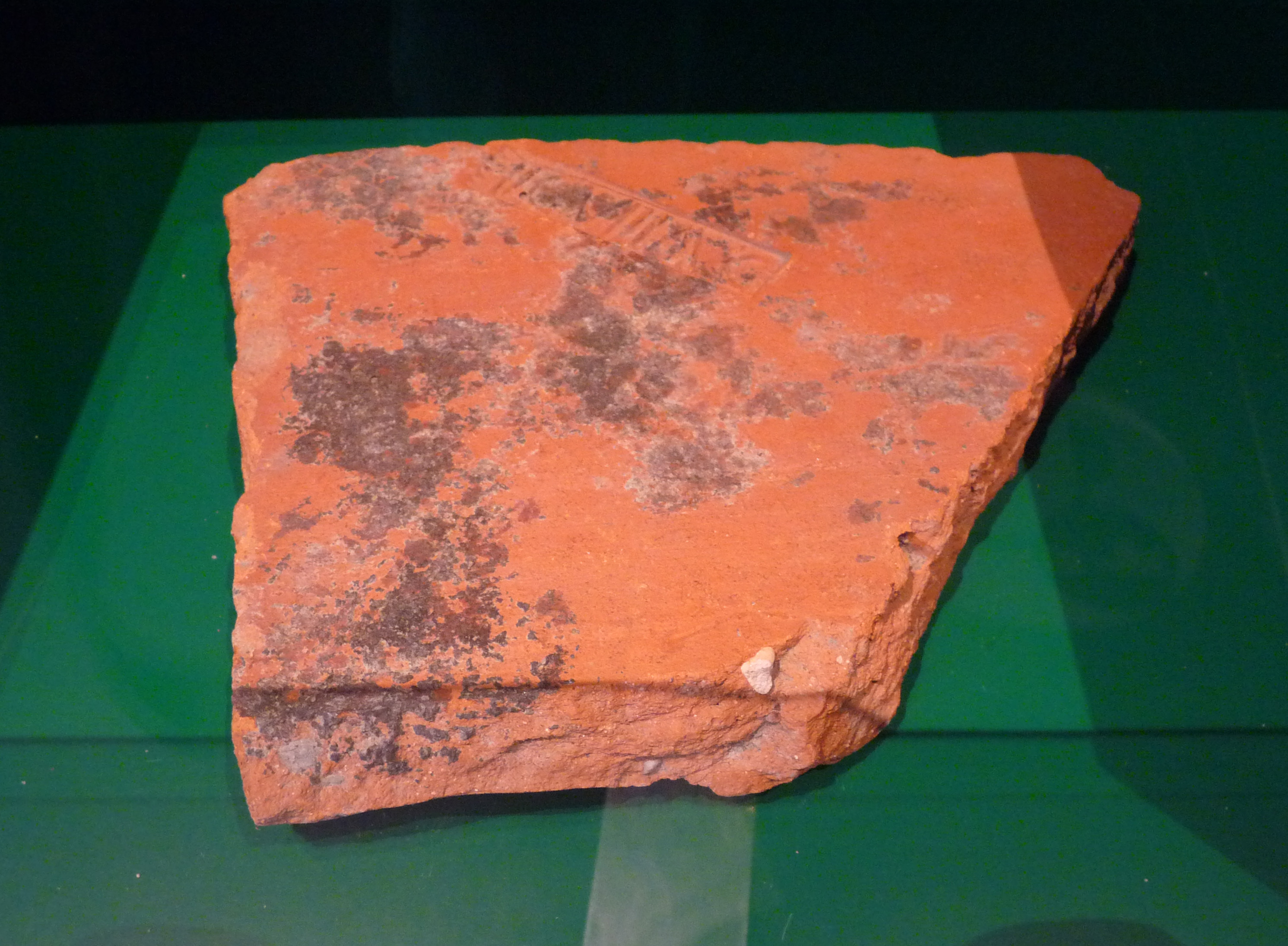
Example of a tile made by troops the Legio VIII Augusta in Mirebeau (This object was found in Strasbourg)

Mirebeau-sur-Bèze is in the Lingones zone between the Aedui and Sequani Celtic tribes. It was an important axis in the network of tracks of eastern Gaul. Recent archaeology shows that the Celtic and Gallo-Roman sanctuary in Mirebeau was present from the end of the 4th century BC. The site was discovered in 1973 by René Goguey from aerial surveys, and was explored from 1977 to 1982 during construction of a college. New excavations carried out by J.P. Guillaumet from 1983 to 1986 brought to light remains of the La Tène culture. In 2001 and 2006 new research resulted in an estimate of the total area of the site at 9,000 square metres (97,000 sq ft) . Several periods of occupation could be distinguished: La Tène B2-C1, La Tène 2DB, Early Auguste and the Flavian period, during which an aqueduct was built.

It seem that the evolution of this sanctuary was influenced by the Roman military presence. A first camp, during the Gallic Wars (58–40 BC.) initially defended the sacred site. A second camp, east of the ancient settlement hosted the Legio VIII Augusta during the Pax Romana, stationed there from 70 to 90 AD due to disturbances among the Lingones. The Roman camp at Mirebeau-sur-Bèze measured 580 by 390 metres (1,900 by 1,280 ft) and had an area of 22 hectares (54 acres). It could house the 5,500 soldiers of the Legio VIII Augusta. Many structures have been found: housing, a hospital, warehouses, a workshop, forum and baths, as well as stamped tiles. The enclosure was imposing and composed of ditches, then a rampart of earth, wood and stones. Monumental gates guarded the entry.

In addition, the meander of the Bèze has traces of development. The upstream part is widened, forming a kind of canal. The convex shore has not been attacked by erosion, as it should have been normally. In addition, on 4 July 1967, photographs of missions carried out by the Mirage III in the 33rd Reconnaissance Wing uncovered a straight line like the wall of a dock. It seems that there was a canal, accessible to ancient river navigation, used to supply the legion in Mirebeau. The Bèze would have been used to carry the reputed wheat that the Lingones sent to Rome, since Mirebeau was in the center of fertile valleys and plateaus. The Bèze is dotted with other sites such as a group of small buildings at "La Venelle" and two apparently protohistoric enclosures on the left bank.

=== Middle Ages ===
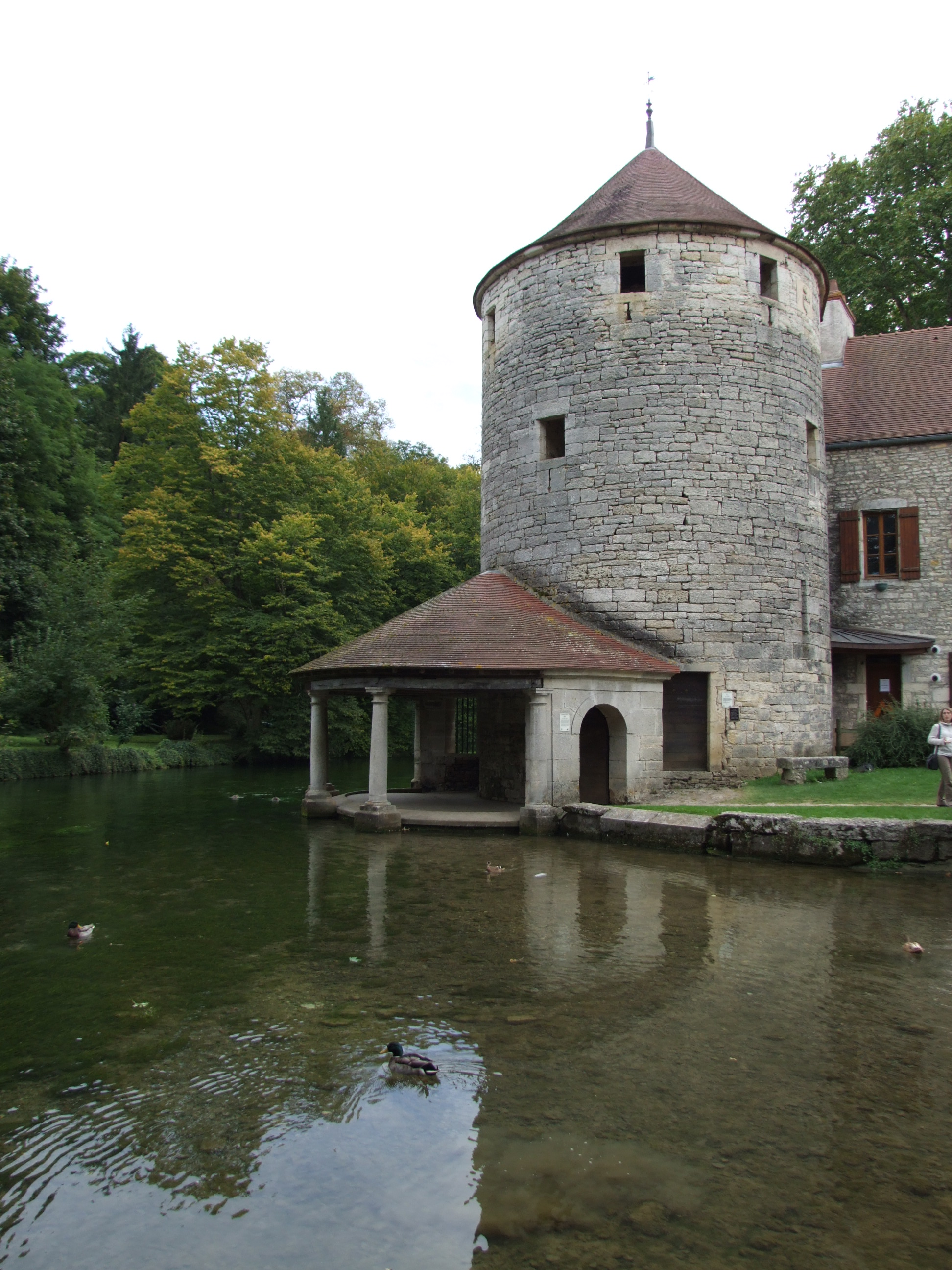
The tower of Oysel in Bèze, one of the vestiges of the old abbey, dominates the river.

The Benedictine Abbaye Saint-Pierre de Bèze was founded in 630. It was visited by Pope Paschal II in February 1107. The town of Bèze then belonged to the province of Champagne. In the 8th century the place was called the "Fountain of Bèze" (Latin: Fons Besue). The Chronique de Bèze from the first 3rd of the 12th century, describes foundation of the abbey on an unoccupied site. Arnanger, Duke of Atuyer, (Note: L'Atuyer (Latin: pagus Attoariorum) was a pagus that stretched from the suburbs of Dijon in the Vingeanne valley.) gave his son Gandelin the order to found a monastery there. The Chronicle says:

He found a place between Saone and Tille, where there sprang an important river called Bèze, with very clear waters, drinkable and rich in all sorts of fish. This river was not like the others which, along their course, increase by receiving streams; from its source, it is a great river. There are all kinds of herbs that can serve as food in case of scarcity ... The land is fairly good and bears abundant fruit if it is cultivated. The meadows are quite rich; it is possible to raise flocks. Forests surround this place; they are sufficient to provide timber and all that is necessary to man.

In 883 the abbey welcomed relics of the martyred Saint Prudent de Narbonne, whose worship was important to Bèze in the 10th, 11th and 12th centuries. According to Solange de Montenay, in 888 the cave served as a refuge from the Normans for the inhabitants of Bèze and the monks of the abbey.

In 1680, the lawyer Bonyard described Beze:

Although Bèze is in a very low basin, the air which is inhaled does not fail to be very healthy, pure, subtle, free and much tempered by the freshness of the water of the river. ... Thirty paces from the town of Bèze it comes out of the foot of a hill with a murmur, a pleasant source of bright and clear water, divided into three uprisings, from a hole whose depth can not be probed, from which it springs forth with such impetuosity that, in winter or rain, it throws its water in a perpendicular line up to nearly twenty feet in height [about 6 metres]. This spring is remarkable for the beautiful and famous trout that are found there and which one admires with pleasure playing in the springs. These fish have a good taste and a considerable price. .. From this source comes a river, which gives or receives its name from the village of Bèze which it waters ... its waters drive hammers, forges and paper mills, several grinding mills. ... The soil is fertile with all kinds of good fruits ... It abounds especially in rye, barley, oats, vegetables and in the best lands it grows very good wheat. The vines produce a good wine ... Iron mines are located in several places of the territory of Bèze.

Bèze also had a castle protected by walls and moats, and a bridge that joined the two sides of the river.

=== Modern period ===
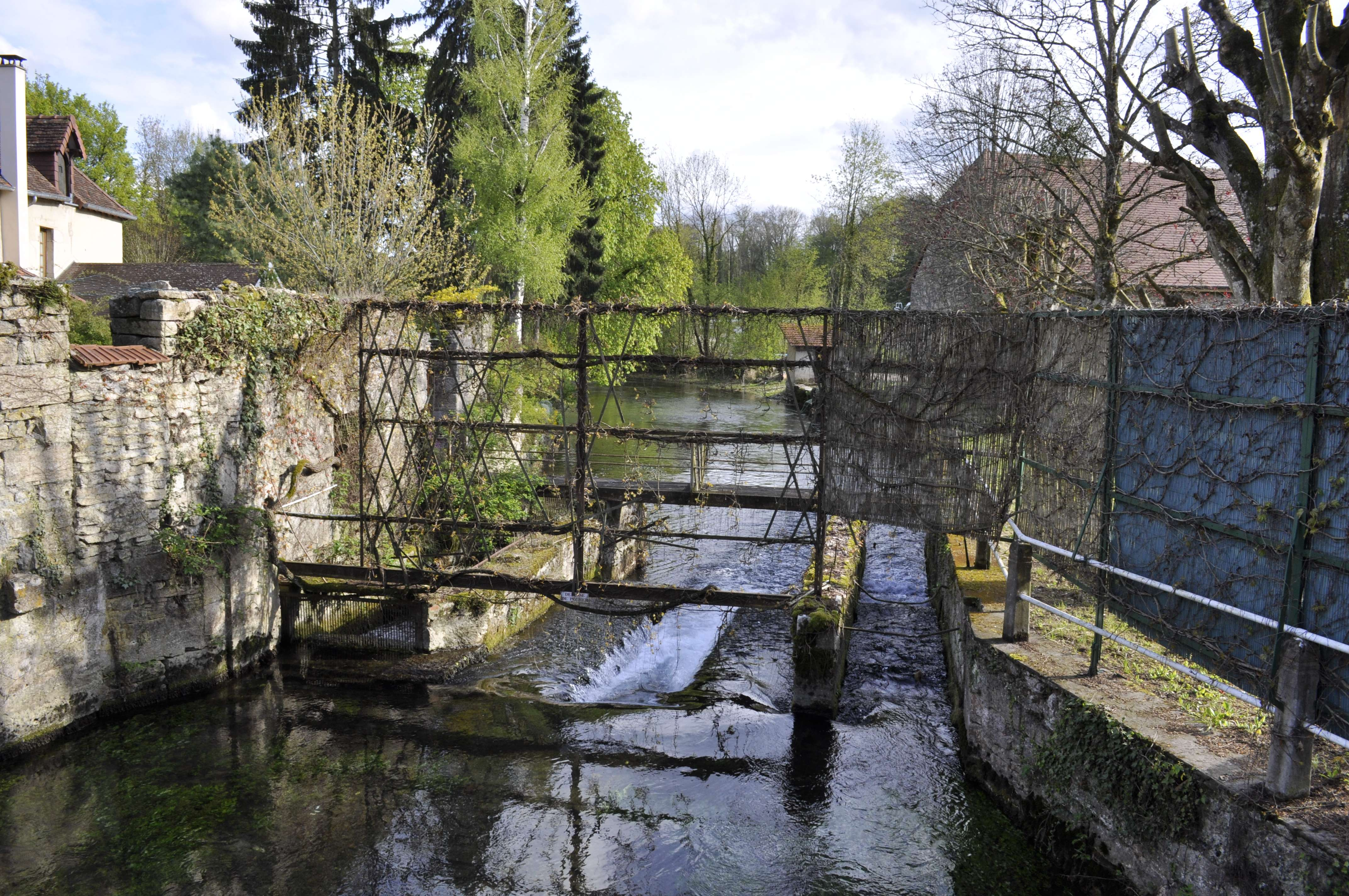
Former hydroelectric dam at the exit of Bèze (Belle-Isle farm in Bèze, towards Mirebeau-sur-Bèze).

==== The Bèze, central element of the Vonges national powder mill ====
The history of the national powder factory of Vonges is linked to that of the Bèze. On 15 July 1753 Emmanuel Piche, the founder of the company, acquired a perpetual lease on the Foullot meadow with a surface area of 3.4 hectares (8.4 acres) and a stretch of the river to install powder mills. As early as 1775, according to the Abbé Claude Courtépée, the village was an important powder production site: "Two powder mills on the Bèze with 24 drums and 24 mortars each, which in 21 hours made 960 pounds of powder. A third mill between the two ... to refine the powder. These mills have grown by four times in 23 years." In 1716 the site required a change in the water level of the Bèze to meet the industrial needs. A major fire in 1839 forced redevelopment, then works in 1840 and 1841 allowed creation of new circular canal pounds and the installation of hydraulic motors. A royal ordinance of 29 April 1841 regulated the use of water in the Vonges powder mill. It regulated the level of the large weir of the old Vonges mill and that of the small spillway of the powder mill, and fixed the dimensions of the discharge valves.

As a result of the extensive development work, and due to numerous complaints from local residents regarding the frequent flooding that transformed grassland around the powder works into unhealthy swamps, on 23 January 1848 a new ordinance was issued concerning the Syndicat de la Bèze. Its purpose was "to prevent the overflow of this watercourse". The first work involved the powder works' canal, dug to replace the old winding bed of the Bèze. Disputes then arose between the residents of the river's left bank and the powder works concerning clearing and maintenance of the old course of the Bèze. The residents demanded compensation. On 26 June 1928 a complaint concerning the Vonges powder works was filed by the riverine communes near the Lower Bèze concerning the floods. Since then a union, which meets once a year, is composed of 14 municipalities and has 28 members, two from each commune, chosen from municipal councils. The contribution is paid by some 500 owners, including the national powder factory of Vonges.

==== De-industrialization of Bézouotte ====
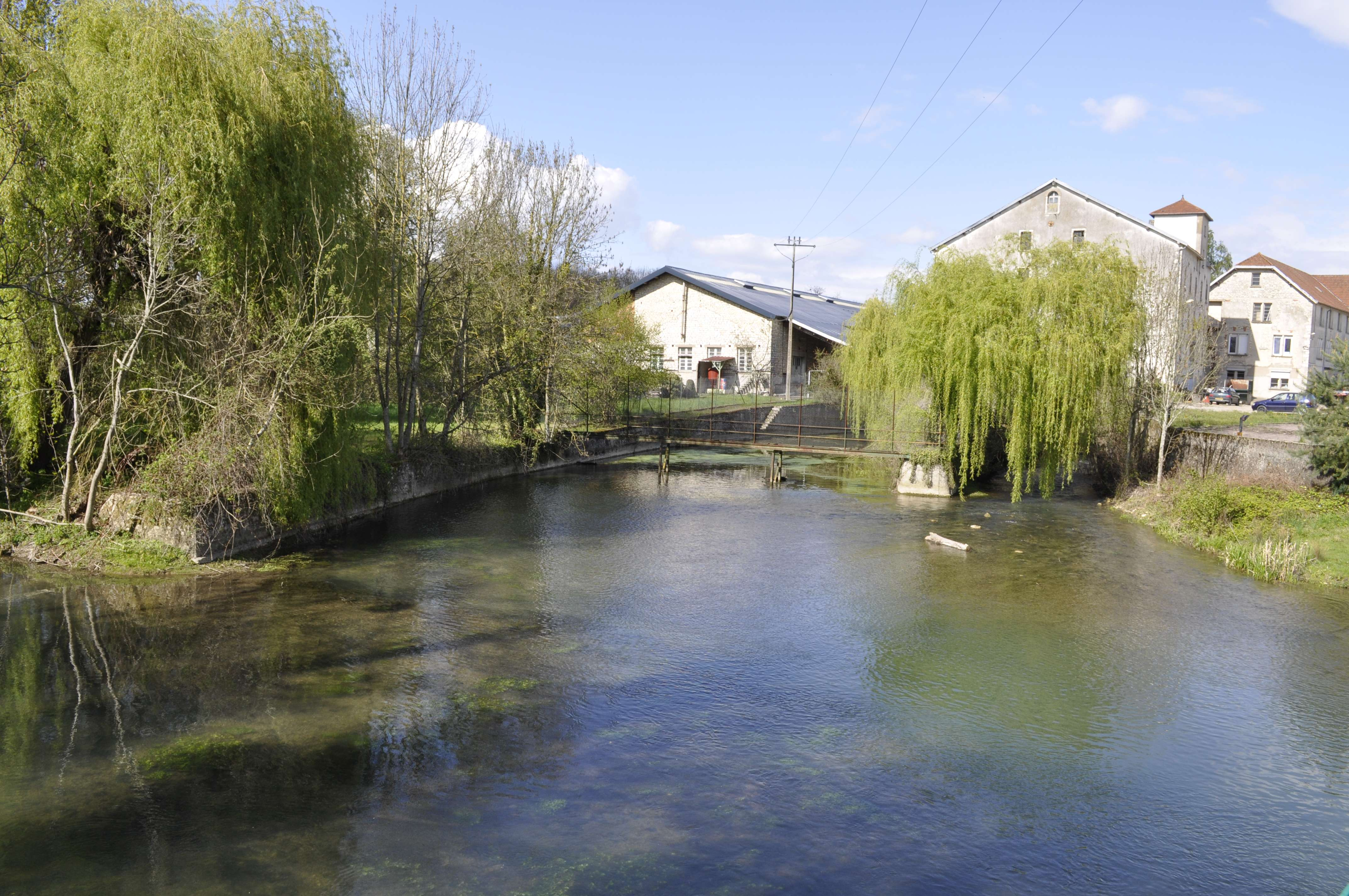
Canal at Bézouotte, former site of the forge

The well-known forge and furnace of Bézouotte disappeared in 1860, ruined by the industrial concentration and free trade policy of Napoleon III. Twenty metallurgists left the village. Around 1870 mills were erected on the sites of the forge and the furnace, but they did not last more than ten years. Hops were cultivated intensively at the end of the 19th century, but then dropped significantly. In addition, several incidents, including a major fire, put an end to the activity. In 1883 the Cuiserey bridge was built on the Bèze. The same year saw the Bèze and its region affected by a terrible drought. Around 1900 M. Ratter equipped the forge's canal with a turbine that supplied three-phase electric power to Pontailler.

==== Mills at Mirebeau-sur-Bèze ====
A mill with ten pairs of cylinders and a pair of wheels is in action at Mirebeau-sur-Beze. It is one of the most important in the region, and can grind a hundred sacks of wheat a day. Two metallic walkways allow workers to carry cereals stored in warehouses across the river to the mill. Since 1900 a 30 horsepower (22 kW) turbine installed next to the mill can produce power for the entire village. In 1903 the covered washing boat on the rue des Moulins was sold by commune.

=== Heritage buildings on the water ===
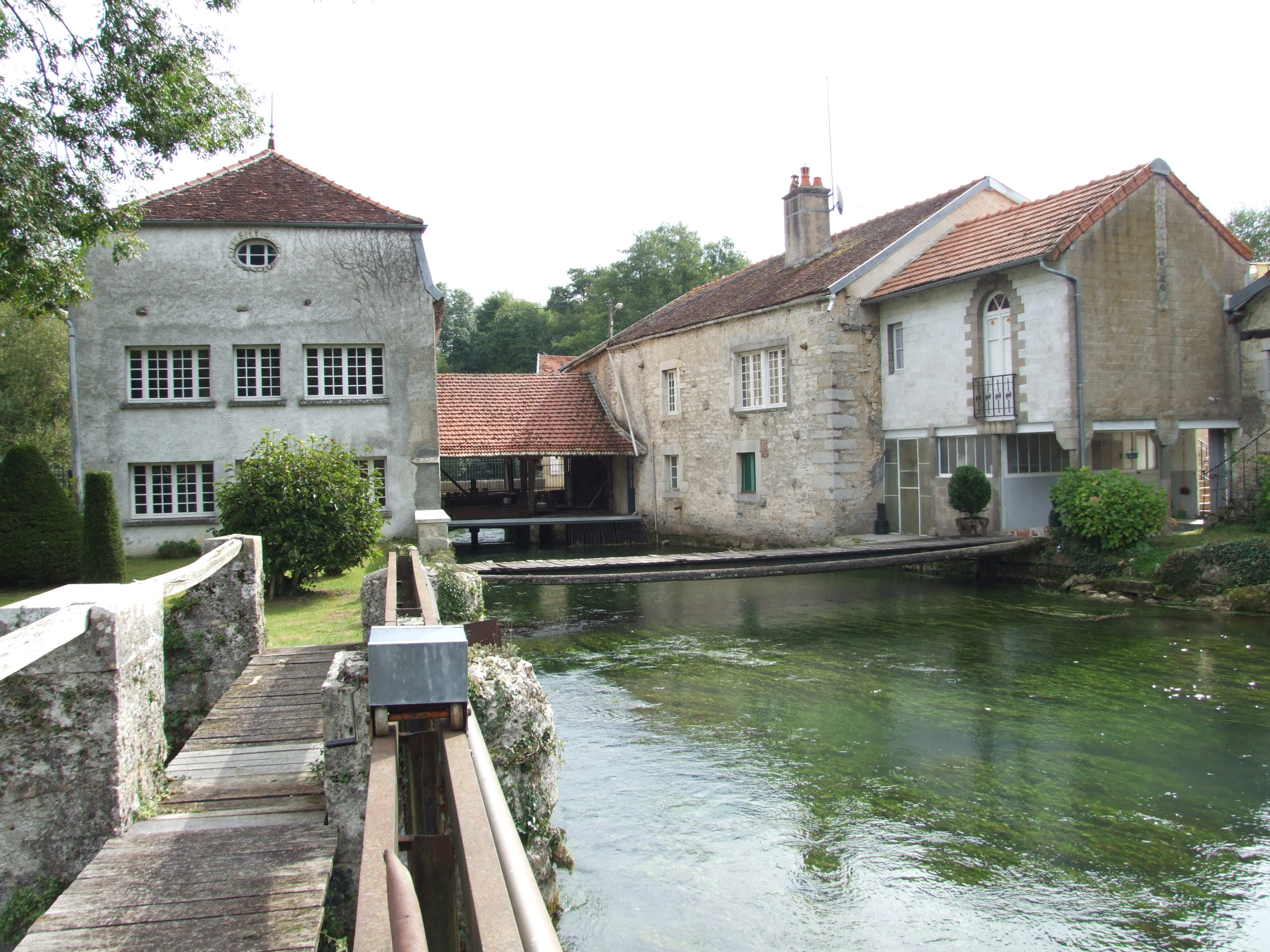
Former mill and blast furnace at Noiron-sur-Bèze, shut down 1858

==== Cultural heritage ====
There is a diverse heritage of buildings on the water. There are washing houses in the all villages crossed by rivers in the Bèze-Albane basin. Some have small valves that are still usable. The remained intact buildings of the former Abbaye Saint-Pierre de Bèze, including the laundry, were listed as a monument historique in 2010. At Mirebeau a castle, of which two towers and part of the walls remain, as well as traces of the city walls, are located along the Bèze. Many hydraulic structures dot the course of Bèze and its tributaries, but only two are still economically useful: the Drambon factory and the Rente de l’Albane in Belleneuve.

==== Old industrial sites ====
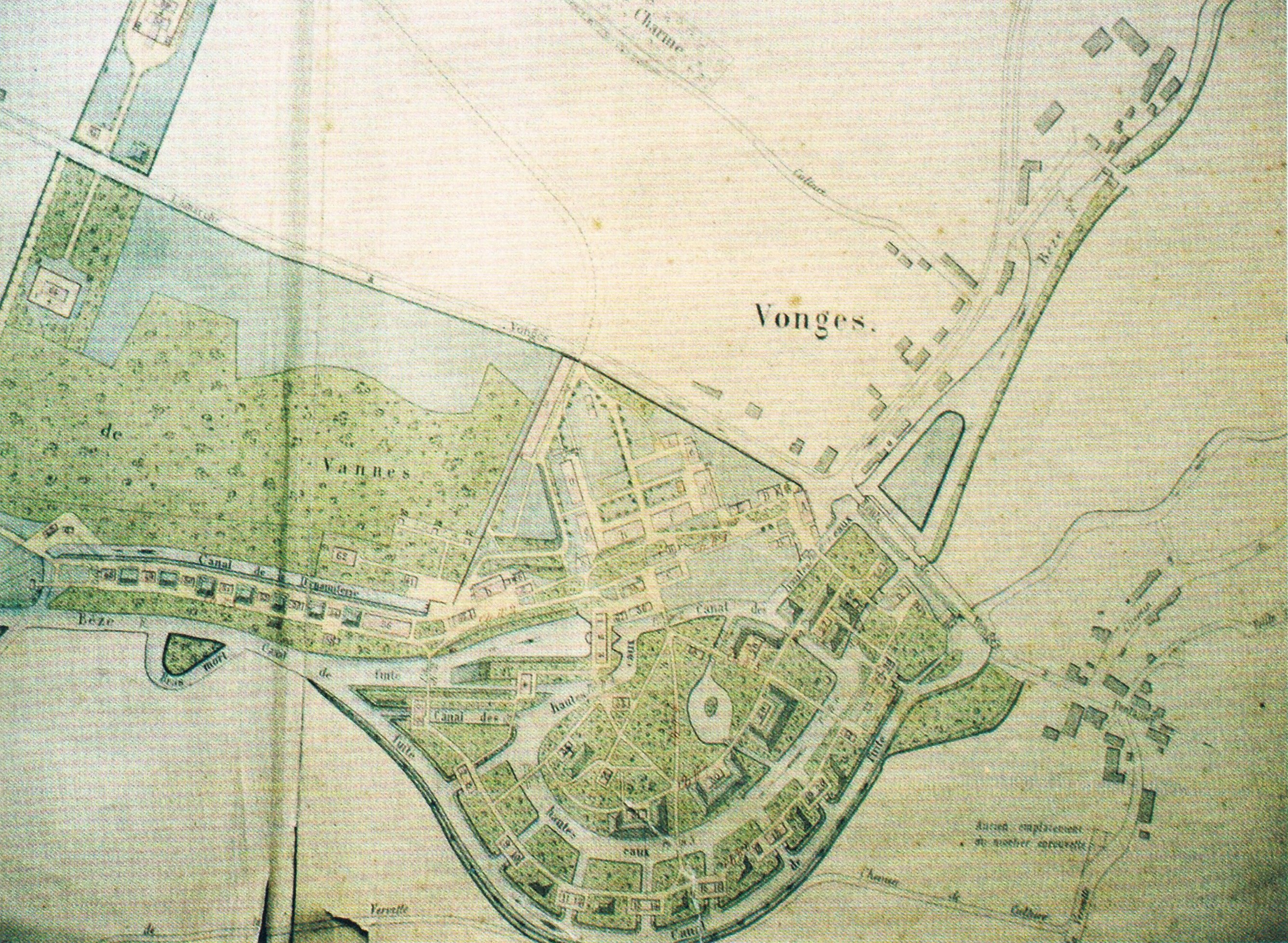
Plan of the Poudrerie nationale de Vonges in 1884 showing the network of canals from the Bèze that cross the industrial site

Milling activities are historically located on watercourses. The Poudrerie nationale de Vonges, built in 1691, is one of the historically emblematic sites of the Bèze-Albane Basin. Old industrial sites are dispersed through the basin, and are mainly old forges or communal waste dumps. The Bureau de Recherches Géologiques et Minières led a national program that included a census of sites across the Burgundy region. Two studies by the Service régional d’aménagement des eaux (SRAE) in 1981, when measuring the flows of the Bèze, and a survey when the Canal des Marais diversion was built to irrigate crops in Drambon in the 1830s, help to enrich or confirm the map of lost industries.

The largest concentrations are in Pontailler-sur-Saône and Mirebeau-sur-Bèze, where there was an old distillery. Waste dumps have also been recorded at Bèze, Viévigne, Noiron-sur-Bèze, and Cirey-les-Pontailler. Old forges are present in almost all the communes crossed by the Bèze and especially in Drambon, Marandeuil, Bézouotte and Noiron-sur-Bèze. These sites represent a potential risk of water pollution, since records confirm that the masters of the Bézouotte forges poured the waste from their furnaces directly into the river. This would have been common practice at other forges at the time. At Noiron-sur-Beze the land of the island and bordering the mill beside the Bèze would be full of these residues. According to the owner the waste was partly used to form the island.

==== Present industrial sites ====
As of 2009 sixteen industrial sites were active on the course of the Bèze. Among them, the two powder mills at Pontailler-sur-Saône and Vonges are classified under the Seveso II Directive as holding dangerous substances. Other industries are subject to self-monitoring for discharges into the environment: PBI in Bézouotte, Titanite SA in Pontailler-sur-Saône, STPI and the Société nationale des poudres et des explosifs in Vonges.

=== Human impact ===
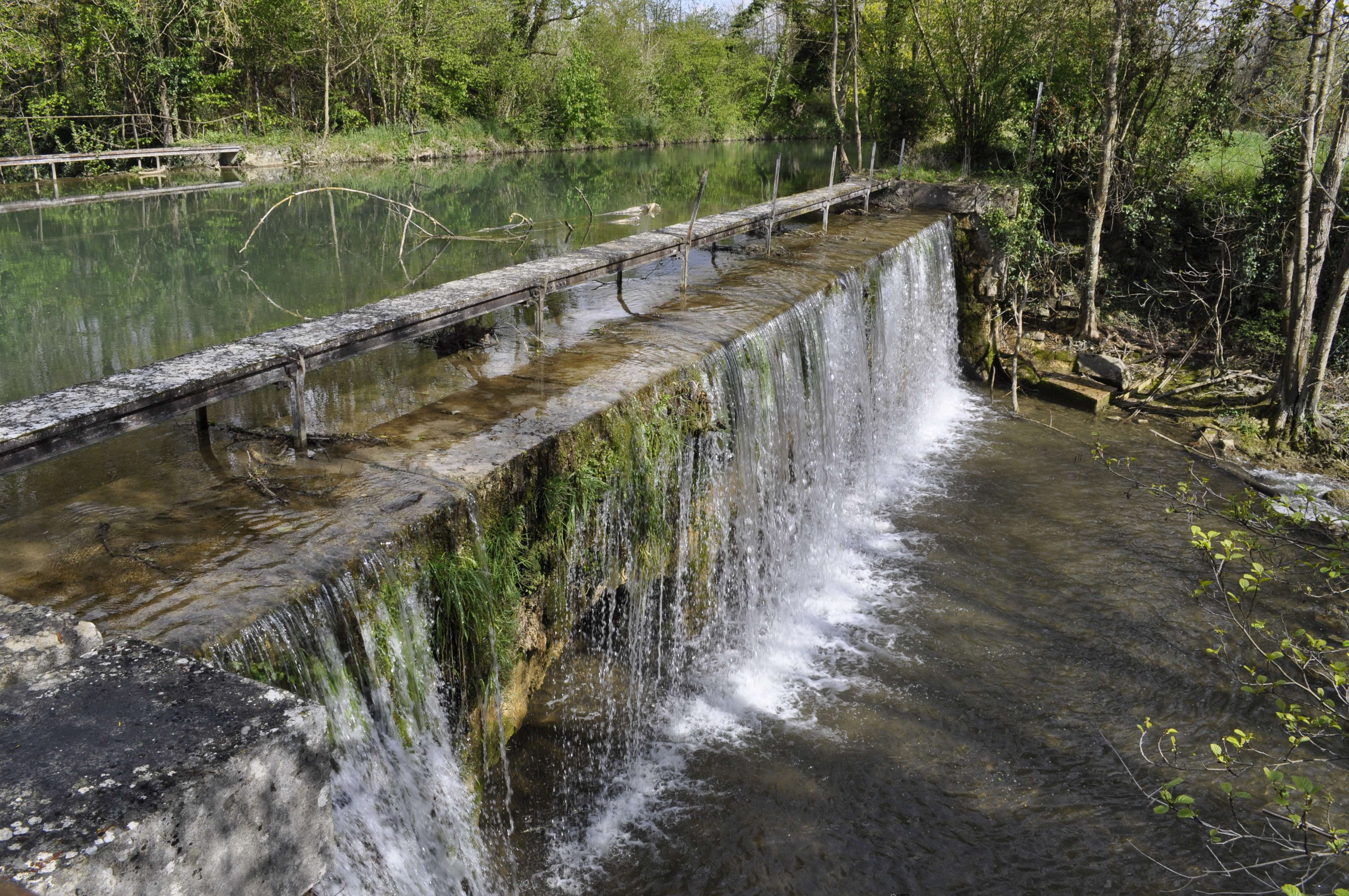
The Bèze is strongly canalized at Drambon. A weir regulates the flow.

The Établissement public territorial de bassin (EBTB) Saône and Doubs notes that during the 20th century the revolution in farming practices led to intense and widespread upheavals in land use in the valleys, and many sanitation and agricultural drainage ditches have dramatically redesigned the river basin's water flows. The Bèze is the watercourse least affected by works along its course, by contrast with its tributaries the Albane, Chiron and Pannecul, which have been modified considerably for agricultural purposes. Some parts of these water courses are truly canalized.

== Ecology and environment ==
=== Fauna and flora ===
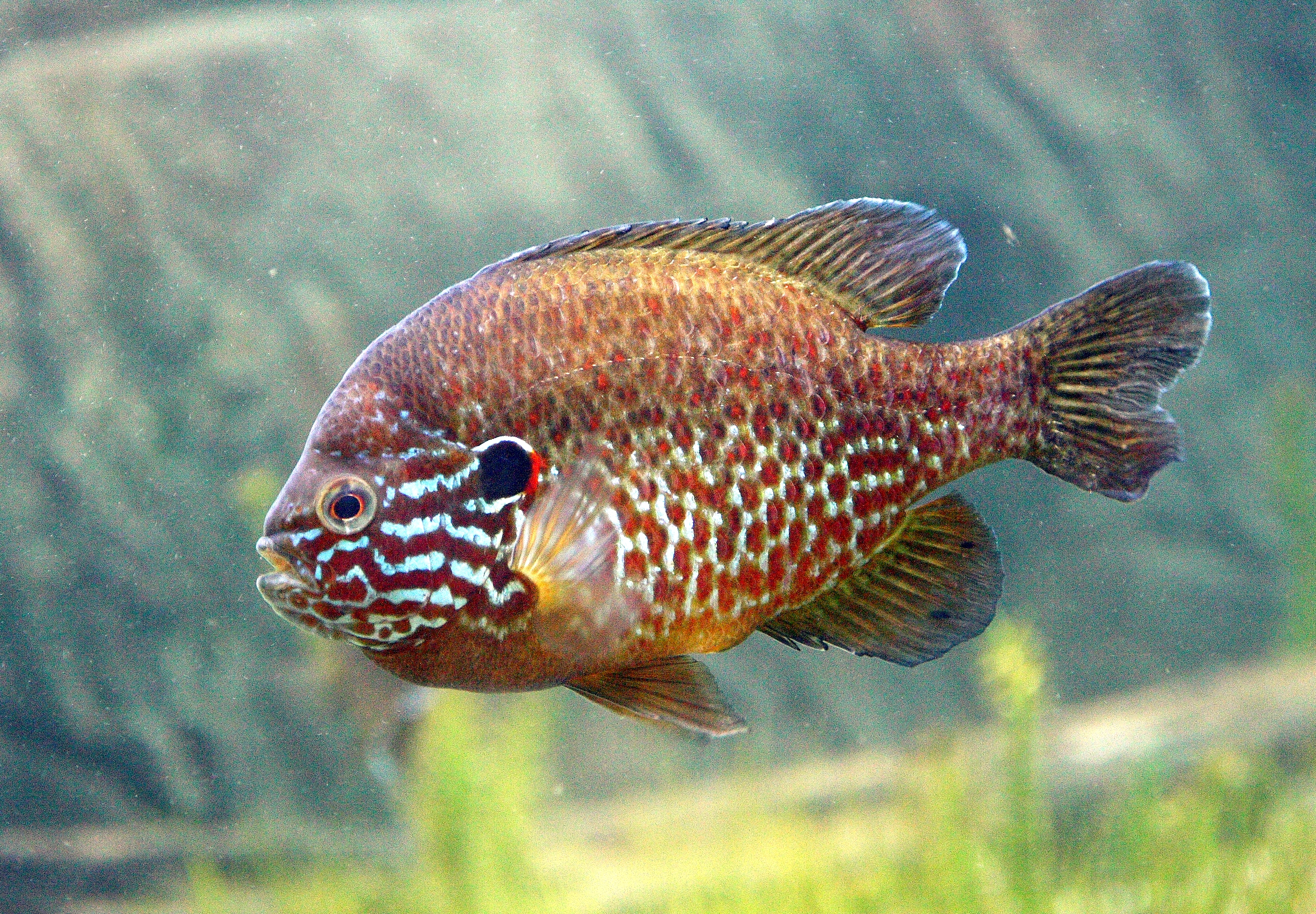
pumpkinseed (Lepomis gibbosus)

==== Species ====
Trout and "Satoille" (probably the European river lamprey) were fished in the Bèze, the Saône and Vingeanne in the Middle Ages. Margaret III, Countess of Flanders recounts having tasted the fish in 1382–83. In 1900 crayfish, which were very common and were fished with a bundle of thorns baited with chicken guts, suddenly disappear as a result of a mysterious epidemic.

Surveys of fish since 1995 show the most common species are trout, stickleback (disappearing), common roach (reappearing), stone loach (reappearing), pumpkinseed (decreasing), black bullhead (decreasing) and common minnow. Downstream of Marandeuil the Bèze has mainly fish of the family Cyprinidae, with the Esox as a reference species.

The status of the fish population in the Bèze-Albane catchment area is provided by the Departmental Plan for the Protection of the Aquatic Environment and the Management of Fish Resources (PDPG, 1998) prepared by the Fédération de Pêche de Côte-d’Or. It notes that the fish context from the resurgence of the Bèze to Marandeuil is a disturbed salmonic context, with trout as a reference species. Only reproduction seems to be disturbed among the three criteria of growth, hatching and breeding.

Wetlands in the watershed are limited to drainage ditches, which contain a few macrophyte species, and in the ponds connected to tributaries of the Bèze and the Albane. Reed beds are present in large numbers.

==== Human impact ====
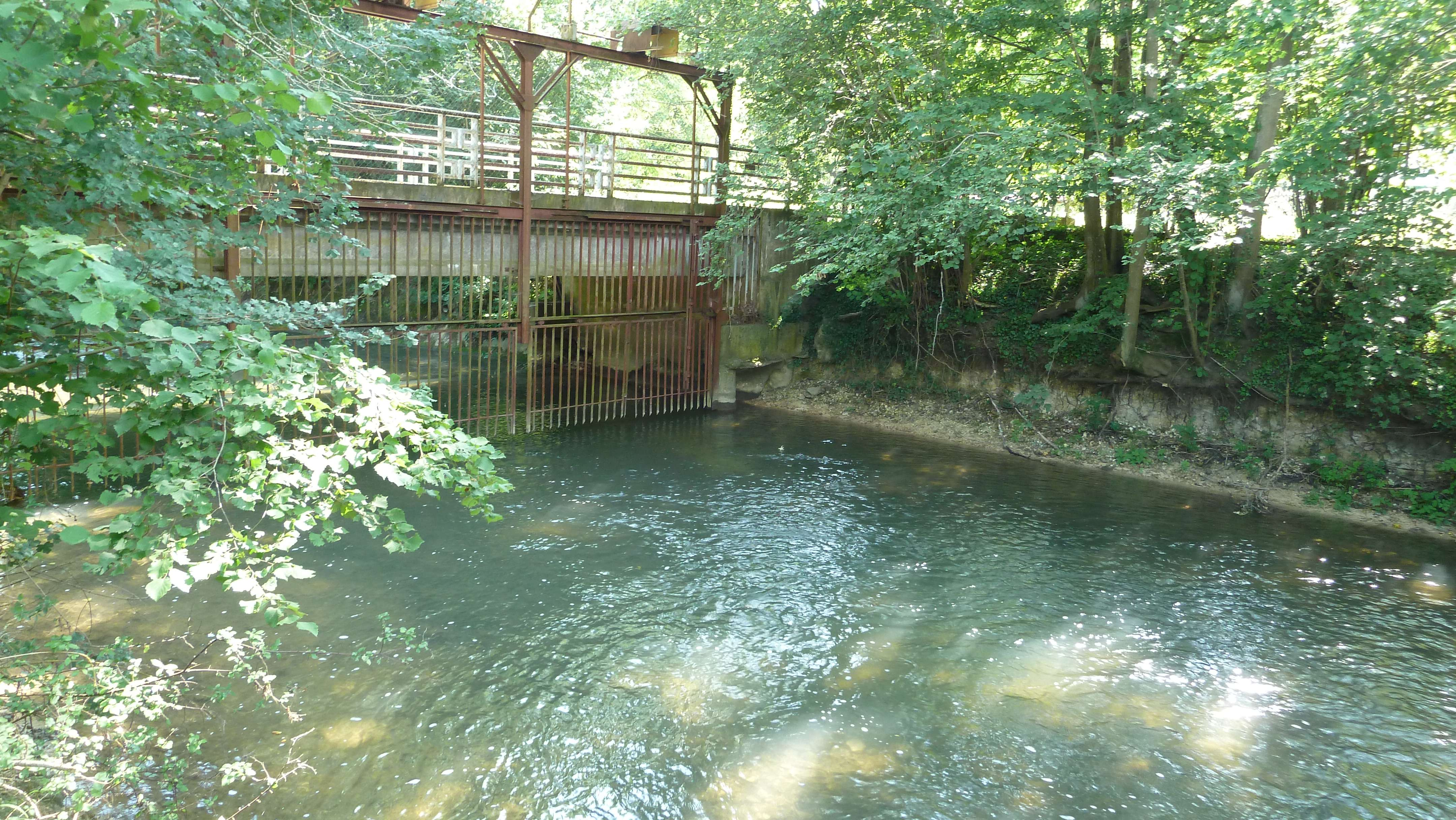
Grid at the entrance to the Vonges powder factory. Some structures built on the Bèze have an important impact on the reproductive, hatching and growth cycles of the animal species living there.

Several factors disrupt wildlife:

- The EDF de la Bèze dam disrupts the reproduction function.
- Discharges from the Mirebeau Wastewater Treatment Plant (WWTP) impact the three functions of breeding, hatching and growth.
- The presence of livestock disrupts the growth function on the tributaries.
- The sluices on the Bèze disturb reproduction and hatching.
- The Vonges powder factory disrupts growth by its discharges.

Pike and perch restocking programs were carried out by the Gaul de Vonges association in 1986, 1987 and 1988, and then by the local Association agréée de pêche et de protection des milieux aquatiques (AAPPMA). The PDPG recommends better management of sluices, large flood areas and improved treatment of the powder factory effluents.

Six hydraulic structures out of the 17 identified in the Bèze-Albane basin are strictly impassable by fish. This shows the extent of the biological partitioning of the main drainage system of the basin. More than 8.5% of the linear watercourse, or 15 kilometres (9.3 mi) is physically influenced by the presence of hydraulic structures. These works promote warming of the water and growth of algae, and limit the development of fresh water animal species.

=== Drinking water ===
In the whole Bèze catchment area, 11 communes, or 27% of all communes, have not delegated their water supply to a syndicate. Five syndicates are partially present: Arc-sur-Tille (3 of the syndicate's 4 communes), Clénay and Saint-Julien (1 of the syndicate's 10 communes), Saône Ognon Vingeanne (5 of the syndicate's 10 communes), Véronnes (2 of the syndicate's 3 communes) and Basse Vingeanne (3 of the syndicate's 5 communes ). The main water manager of the basin is the Groupe Saur, with 78% of communes in the basin. SDEI, now Lyonnaise, manages 5%, or 2 municipalities. 17% of municipalities have opted to manage their own water. Eight use the watershed resource and six of these manage sources. The estimated water volumes used in the basin are 400,000 cubic metres (14,000,000 cu ft) per year.

=== Pollution ===
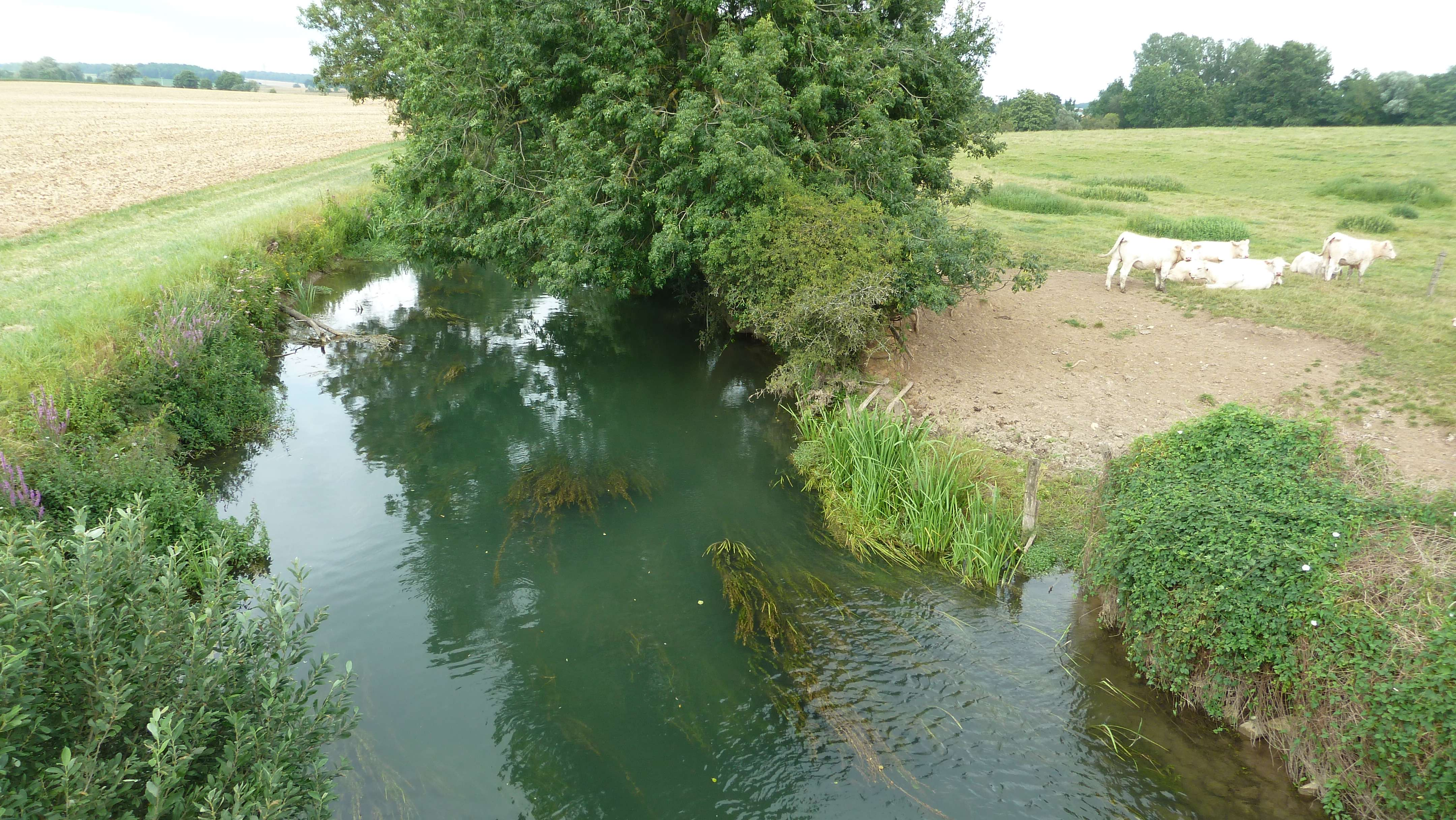
Cows grazing in Saint-Léger-Triey. Agricultural and livestock along the Bèze have important consequences for the quality of its waters.

Nine stations measure the quality of surface water along the course of the Bèze.

The Établissement Public Territorial du Bassin (EPTB) Saône and Doubs noted a concentration of nitrates in two bodies of water in the Bèze water catchment. The nitrate quality is poor on all the stations of the basin with a maximum at the outlet of basin. The quality of metals (essentially chrome and nickel micropollutants) is average, but appears to be localized near the former Drambon and Marandeuil forges. The Saint-Léger station records contamination by arsenic and nickel. Agricultural activities are the main source of diffuse nitrate pollution. This has serious repercussions, since the potability of the water supply is questionable. The whole of the Bèze-Albane basin is classed as being in a vulnerable zone for nitrates. This classification aims at protecting the environment, in this case the aquifer of the Saône, against contamination by nitrates. A program for establishment of grass strips was decided in 2009. Since then there has been a marked improvement in the quality of water. Planting of saplings is causing a riparian forest to reappear on the river banks.

The Departmental Council of Côte-d'Or has been monitoring the quality of the surface waters of the Bèze catchment since 1994 by measurement stations that are monitored every two years.

Uncontrolled refuse dumps have been observed and are the target of an awareness campaign.

=== Agriculture and irrigation ===
Agriculture is the main economic activity of the Beza watershed. Large-scale intensive crops have generally replaced the river's edge grasslands that were grazed or mowed before. The crops are now drained and only a few farmers are still irrigating their crops, mainly maize and potatoes, from the Bèze. A water body at the source of the Albane was designed for this purpose. According to the figures of the Mission Inter Services de l'Eau the average annual consumption for irrigation in the catchment area is 98,500 cubic metres (3,480,000 cu ft) per year. Almost all of this flow is used from May to September, over five months, with peaks often observed in June and July. These samples would represent about 17% of total basin catchments. The impact of these withdrawals is considered negligible given the absence of modification of flow of streams.

=== Sanitation ===
Sewage treatment in the Bèze catchment area is managed by 23 municipalities through an intermunicipal network, representing 56% of the communes. According to EPTB Saône and Doubs, Lamarche-sur-Saône, Pontailler-sur-Saône and Vonges turn to the Saône, which then receives the waste. Vonges is connected to one of the treatment stations of Pontailler-sur-Saône. 16 municipalities do not have treatment facilities at present, i.e. 43% of municipalities. Half of the facilities are very recent, and two are licensed to treat nitrogen and phosphorus in accordance with the Urban Wastewater Directive (ERU) 92. The treatment plants in the Bèze watershed are of three types: activated sludge, filter plant or natural lagooning.

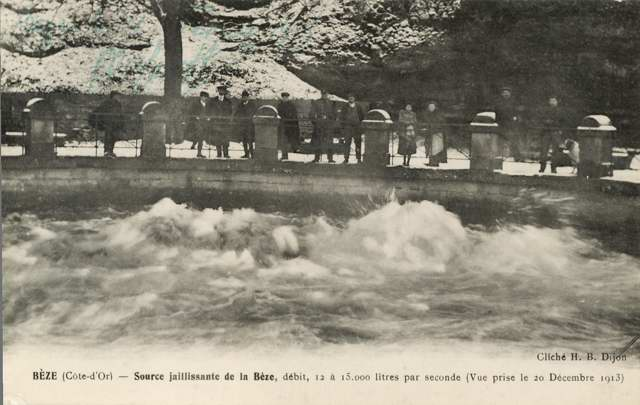
Flood of the river at Bèze on 20 December 1913 caused by a major outburst at the spring

=== Natural hazards ===
La Bèze and its watershed do not contain major natural hazards. Areas at risk of flooding are agricultural areas. The communes vulnerable to this risk according to the Direction régionale de l'environnement (DIREN) are Mirebeau and Bourberain. The confluence zones (Saint-Léger-Triey, Vonges and Trochères) are particularly affected by the floods. Flood periods are relatively short, with the river usually returning to its bed after one to five days. The main risk of flooding comes from poor management of hydraulic structures, particularly in the communes of Bèze, Drambon, Bézouotte and Vonges.

The woods around Mirebeau hold poplar trees on the banks of the Bèze, which can constitute risks for the banks, given the very shallow roots of this tree.

== Sources ==
- Badin, M.; Quantin, M. (1847), J. J. Dubochet (ed.), Géographie départementale classique et administrative de la France, vol. 4
- Bardouille, Jérôme (2010), "L'importance du génie militaire dans l'armée romaine à l'époque impériale", Revue historique des armées (261): 79–87, doi:10.3917/rha.261.0079
- Beck, Corinne (2008), Les eaux et forêts en Bourgogne ducale (vers 1350-vers 1480): Société et biodiversité, L'Harmattan, ISBN 9782296058507
- Chronicon beanense (in French), Garnier (Analecta divionensia)
- Degouve, P.; Laureau, P. (1981), "L'écho des profondeurs", Spélunca - Bulletin de la FFS (in French) (2): 5 et 6
- EPTB: Établissement Public Territorial du Bassin de la Saône et du Doubs (September 2009), EPTB Saône et Doubs (ed.), Qualité des eaux du bassin versant Bèze Albane (in French), archived from the original (pdf) on 2016-03-03
- EPTB: Établissement Public Territorial du Bassin de la Saône et du Doubs (March 2011), État des lieux du contrat de rivière Bèze-Albane (PDF) (in French)
- Binet, Louis (1984), Éditions de Saint-Seine-l'Abbaye (ed.), Le Canton de Mirebeau-sur-Bèze en 1900 à travers les cartes postales (in French), Editions de Saint-Seine-l'Abbaye, p. 79, ISBN 2867010306
- Delencre, Florent; Garcia, Jean-Pierre (2011), "La distribution des tuiles estampillées de la VIIIe légion Augusta autour de Mirebeau-sur-Bèze (Côte-d'Or, France)", Revue Archéologique de l'Est (in French), 60 (60): 553
- Dijon, S.C., "Coupe schématique du réseau actif de la grotte de la Crétanne", www.plongeesout.com
- Gardaine, P.; Laureau, P. (1972), "La source de la Bèze", Sous le Plancher - Bulletin du S.C. Dijon (in French) (3 & 4)
- Goguey, René (2008), "Légionnaires romains chez les Lingons : la VIIIe Augusta à Mirebeau (Côte-d'Or)", Revue Archéologique de l'Est (in French), 57
- Goguey, René (2007), "Habitats, nécropoles et lieux de culte des Pertes de la Venelle à Lux (Côte-d'Or)", Revue Archéologique de l'Est (in French), 56
- Henry, J.-P.; Magniez, G. (1970), "Les Asellides de la rivière souterraine de Bèze (Côte d'Or) : description de Proasellus burgundus n. sp. (Crustacea Isopoda Asellota)", Bulletin Scientifique de Bourgogne (in French) (26)
- "Inventaire des chartes et titres de l'abbaye de Bèze, folio 981", Archives de la Côte d'Or, 3H
- Joly, Martine; Barral, Philippe (2005), "Le sanctuaire de Mirebeau-sur-Bèze (Côte-d'Or) : bilan des recherches récentes", L'âge du Fer dans l'arc jurassien et ses marges. Dépôts, lieux sacrés et territorialité à l'âge du Fer, Série " Environnement, sociétés et archéologie" 11 (in French), vol. 1, Bienne: Presses universitaires de l'Université de Franche-Comté, pp. 55–72
- "Liste des stations qualité des eaux superficielles (fiches signalétiques) : la BÈZE", sierm.eaurmc.fr, 12 April 2012
- Loriol, M. B. de (1955), "Contributions aux recherches sur l'origine de la Bèze", Sous le Plancher - Bulletin du S.C. Dijon (in French) (6): 10–14
- Marillier, J.; Velard, Roland (1958), "Bèze - son histoire, son site, sa grotte", Sous le Plancher - Bulletin du S.C. Dijon (in French) (2): 35–40
- Meline, Pierre; Jacques, Christine (1991), Trois siècles d'activité à la Poudrerie de Vonges – 1691-1991 (in French), Groupe SNPE
- Monget, Rémy (24 April 2011), "Bèze. La visite des grottes demeure le point fort du tourisme dans la région. De l'obscurité à la lumière", bienpublic.com (in French)
- Monget, Rémy (3 April 2012), "Dans les entrailles de l'histoire", bienpublic.com (in French)
- Monget, Rémy (29 July 2012b), "Bèze : au centre de la terre", bienpublic.com (in French)
- "Plan de l'ancien moulin de Noiron (1732)", archivesenligne.cotedor.fr (in French)
- "Réseau de la Crétanne et source de la Beze", plongeesout.com
- Robert, François (1789), Hôtel d'Aubeterre (ed.), Voyage dans les treize Cantons Suisses (in French)
- Soriano, Sylvain; Lechenet, Henri (2000), "Des "Orvilles" en Bourgogne. L'occupation du site de la Roncière (Bèze, Côte-d'Or) au Paléolithique supérieur", Table Ronde de Chambéry (in French), 28 (5), Chambéry: 223–233, archived from the original on 2017-10-01
- "Synthèse: La Bèze à Bèze (ferme de Rome)", Banque Hydro (in French), MEDDE
- Tintant, Henri (1953), Observations sur des sédiments de la grotte de Bèze (Côte-d'Or), First Congrès international de spéléologie, vol. II, Paris
- Tintant, H. (1958), "Grotte de Bèze (suite) - Géologie et hydrologie", Sous le Plancher - Bulletin du S.C. Dijon (in French) (4–5): 68–73
- Velard, Roland (1958), "Bèze - son histoire, son site, sa grotte (suite)", Sous le Plancher - Bulletin du S.C. Dijon (in French) (3): 52–57
- "ZNIEFF 260015026 - VALLEE DE LA BEZE", Inventaire National du Patrimoine Naturel
