= Noiron-sur-Bèze =

- Commune
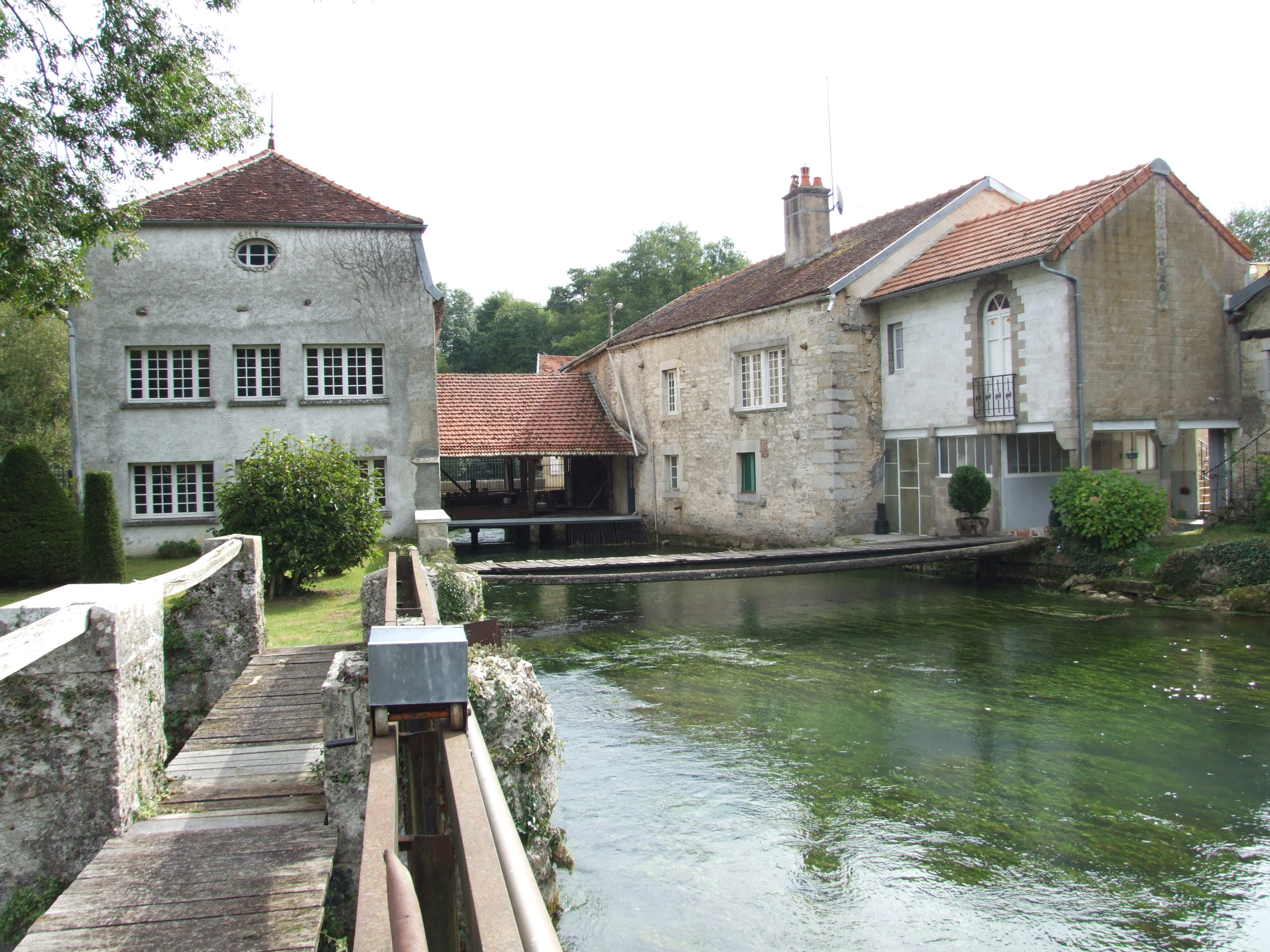
- The Bèze
- Location of Noiron-sur-Bèze
- Location within France Location within Bourgogne-Franche-Comté
- Coordinates: 47°26′20″N 5°18′03″E
- Country: France
- Region: Bourgogne-Franche-Comté
- Department: Côte-d'Or
- Arrondissement: Dijon
- Canton: Saint-Apollinaire

Government
  - Mayor (2020–2026): Patrick Moreau
- Area^{1}: 11.8 km^{2} (4.6 sq mi)
- Elevation: 200 m (660 ft)
- Highest elevation: 253 m (830 ft)
- Lowest elevation: 197 m (646 ft)
- Population (2023): 228
  - Density: 19.3/km^{2} (50.0/sq mi)
- Time zone: UTC+01:00 (CET)
  - Summer (DST): UTC+02:00 (CEST)
- INSEE/Postal code: 21459 /21310
- ^{1} French Land Register data, which excludes lakes, ponds, glaciers > 1 km^{2} (0.386 sq mi or 247 acres) and river estuaries.

Noiron-sur-Bèze (French pronunciation: [nwaʁɔ̃ syʁ bɛz], literally Noiron on Bèze) is a commune in the Côte-d'Or department in eastern France.

== Population ==
Historical population
Year	Pop.	±% p.a.
1968	168	—
1975	172	+0.34%
1982	178	+0.49%
1990	183	+0.35%
1999	166	−1.08%
2007	223	+3.76%
2012	217	−0.54%
2017	238	+1.86%
2023	228	−0.71%
Source: INSEE

== See also ==
- Communes of the Côte-d'Or department
