= Tanay, Côte-d'Or =

Tanay
- Commune
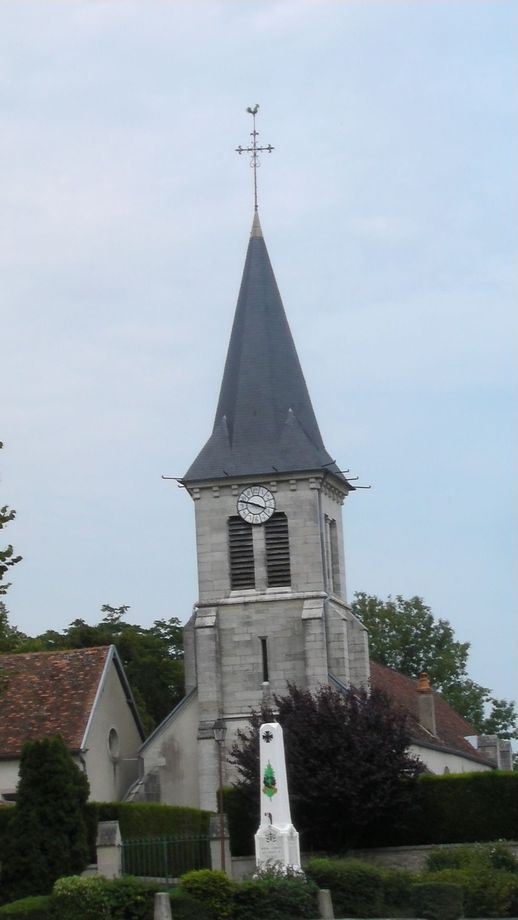
- The church in Tanay

- Coat of arms
- Location of Tanay
- Location within France Location within Bourgogne-Franche-Comté
- Coordinates: 47°24′36″N 5°16′38″E
- Country: France
- Region: Bourgogne-Franche-Comté
- Department: Côte-d'Or
- Arrondissement: Dijon
- Canton: Saint-Apollinaire

Government
  - Mayor (2020–2026): Marcel Marceau
- Area^{1}: 12.65 km^{2} (4.88 sq mi)
- Elevation: 255 m (837 ft)
- Highest elevation: 266 m (873 ft)
- Lowest elevation: 198 m (650 ft)
- Population (2023): 227
  - Density: 17.9/km^{2} (46.5/sq mi)
- Time zone: UTC+01:00 (CET)
  - Summer (DST): UTC+02:00 (CEST)
- INSEE/Postal code: 21619 /21310
- ^{1} French Land Register data, which excludes lakes, ponds, glaciers > 1 km^{2} (0.386 sq mi or 247 acres) and river estuaries.

Tanay (French pronunciation: [tanɛ]) is a commune in the Côte-d'Or department in eastern France.

== Population ==
Historical population
Year	Pop.	±% p.a.
1968	220	—
1975	191	−2.00%
1982	242	+3.44%
1990	250	+0.41%
1999	232	−0.83%
2007	222	−0.55%
2012	235	+1.14%
2017	228	−0.60%
2023	227	−0.07%
Source: INSEE

== See also ==
- Communes of the Côte-d'Or department
