= Belleneuve =

- Commune
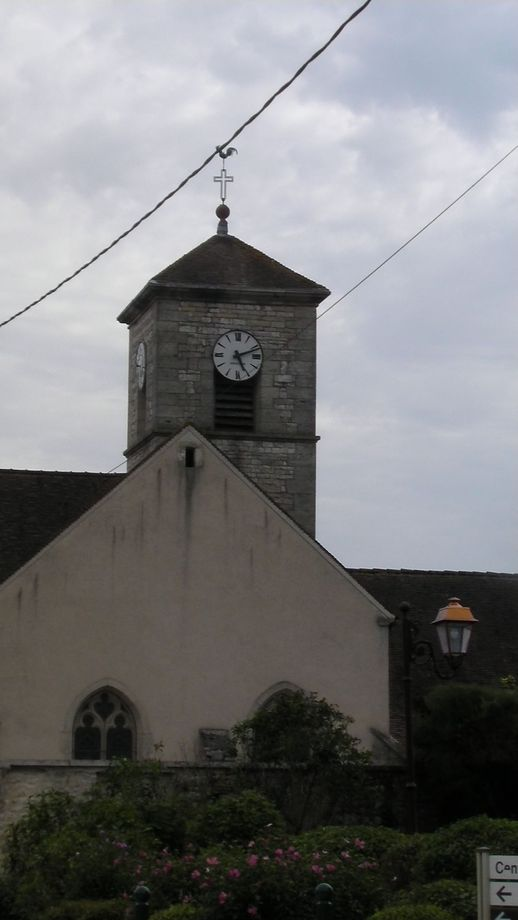
- The church in Belleneuve

- Coat of arms
- Location of Belleneuve
- Location within France Location within Bourgogne-Franche-Comté
- Coordinates: 47°21′29″N 5°15′59″E
- Country: France
- Region: Bourgogne-Franche-Comté
- Department: Côte-d'Or
- Arrondissement: Dijon
- Canton: Saint-Apollinaire

Government
  - Mayor (2020–2026): Marc Boeglin
- Area^{1}: 14.47 km^{2} (5.59 sq mi)
- Elevation: 204 m (669 ft)
- Highest elevation: 256 m (840 ft)
- Lowest elevation: 192 m (630 ft)
- Population (2023): 1,571
  - Density: 108.6/km^{2} (281.2/sq mi)
- Time zone: UTC+01:00 (CET)
  - Summer (DST): UTC+02:00 (CEST)
- INSEE/Postal code: 21060 /21310
- ^{1} French Land Register data, which excludes lakes, ponds, glaciers > 1 km^{2} (0.386 sq mi or 247 acres) and river estuaries.

Belleneuve (French pronunciation: [bɛlnœv]) is a commune in the Côte-d'Or department in eastern France. In February 1965, it absorbed the former commune Arçon.

== Population ==
Historical population
Year	Pop.	±% p.a.
1968	243	—
1975	845	+19.49%
1982	1,501	+8.55%
1990	1,398	−0.88%
1999	1,398	+0.00%
2007	1,424	+0.23%
2012	1,633	+2.78%
2017	1,618	−0.18%
2023	1,571	−0.49%
Source: INSEE

== See also ==
- Communes of the Côte-d'Or department
