= Savolles =

- Commune
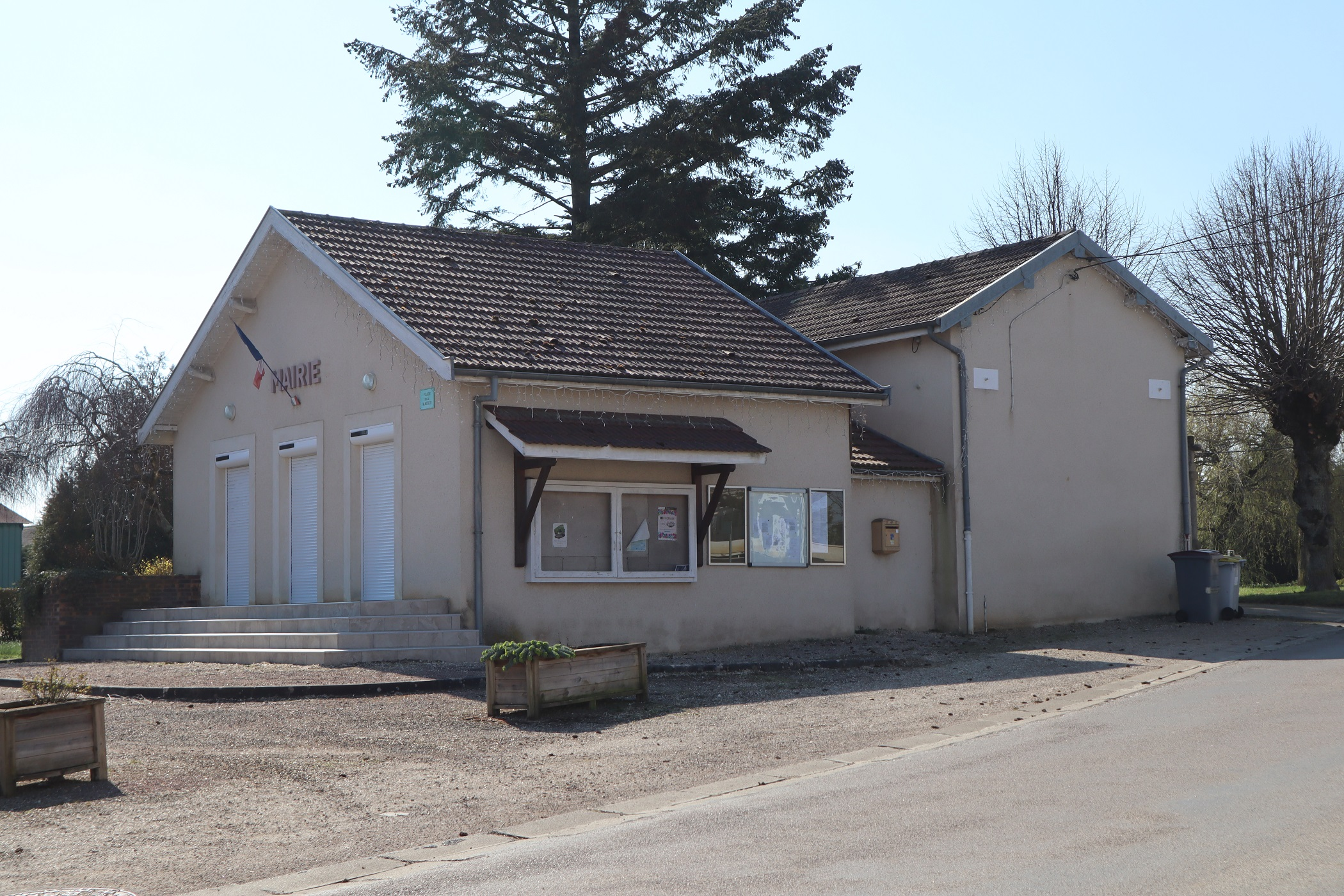
- Town hall
- Location of Savolles
- Location within France Location within Bourgogne-Franche-Comté
- Coordinates: 47°22′38″N 5°16′32″E
- Country: France
- Region: Bourgogne-Franche-Comté
- Department: Côte-d'Or
- Arrondissement: Dijon
- Canton: Saint-Apollinaire

Government
  - Mayor (2020–2026): Isabelle Lajoux
- Area^{1}: 3.12 km^{2} (1.20 sq mi)
- Elevation: 241 m (791 ft)
- Highest elevation: 253 m (830 ft)
- Lowest elevation: 204 m (669 ft)
- Population (2023): 145
  - Density: 46.5/km^{2} (120/sq mi)
- Time zone: UTC+01:00 (CET)
  - Summer (DST): UTC+02:00 (CEST)
- INSEE/Postal code: 21595 /21310
- ^{1} French Land Register data, which excludes lakes, ponds, glaciers > 1 km^{2} (0.386 sq mi or 247 acres) and river estuaries.

Savolles (French pronunciation: [savɔl]) is a commune in the Côte-d'Or department in eastern France.

== Population ==
Historical population
Year	Pop.	±% p.a.
1968	29	—
1975	34	+2.30%
1982	42	+3.06%
1990	98	+11.17%
1999	128	+3.01%
2007	164	+3.15%
2012	149	−1.90%
2017	161	+1.56%
2023	145	−1.73%
Source: INSEE

== See also ==
- Communes of the Côte-d'Or department
