= Cuiserey =

Commune of France

- Commune
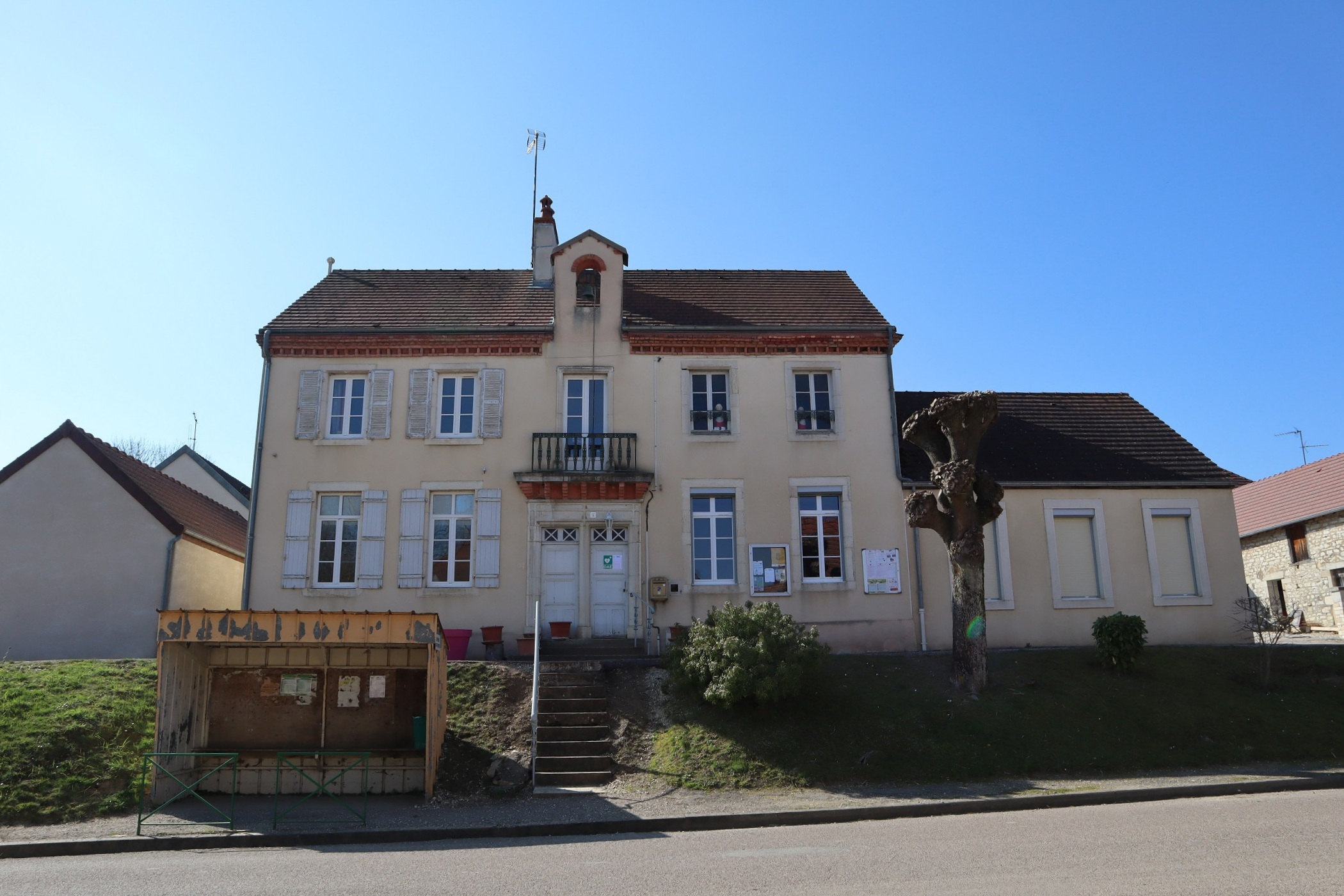

- Coat of arms
- Location of Cuiserey
- Location within France Location within Bourgogne-Franche-Comté
- Coordinates: 47°22′24″N 5°19′23″E
- Country: France
- Region: Bourgogne-Franche-Comté
- Department: Côte-d'Or
- Arrondissement: Dijon
- Canton: Saint-Apollinaire

Government
  - Mayor (2020–2026): Jean-Claude Marcaire
- Area^{1}: 6.33 km^{2} (2.44 sq mi)
- Highest elevation: 223 m (732 ft)
- Lowest elevation: 192 m (630 ft)
- Population (2023): 172
  - Density: 27.2/km^{2} (70.4/sq mi)
- Time zone: UTC+01:00 (CET)
  - Summer (DST): UTC+02:00 (CEST)
- INSEE/Postal code: 21215 /21310
- ^{1} French Land Register data, which excludes lakes, ponds, glaciers > 1 km^{2} (0.386 sq mi or 247 acres) and river estuaries.

Cuiserey (French pronunciation: [kɥizʁɛ]) is a commune in the Côte-d'Or department in eastern France.

== Population ==
Historical population
Year	Pop.	±% p.a.
1968	72	—
1975	73	+0.20%
1982	92	+3.36%
1990	91	−0.14%
1999	85	−0.76%
2007	144	+6.81%
2012	160	+2.13%
2017	182	+2.61%
2023	172	−0.94%
Source: INSEE

== See also ==
- Communes of the Côte-d'Or department
