= Fahy =

Fahy may refer to:

- Fahy (surname), includes a list of people with the name
- Fahy, Switzerland, a municipality in Porrentruy, Jura, Switzerland
- Fahy, County Mayo, Ireland
- Fahy-lès-Autrey, Haute-Saône, France
- Fahy, a townland in County Clare, Ireland, see List of townlands of County Clare
- Fahy, a townland in County Kilkenny, Ireland, see List of townlands of County Kilkenny#F
- A number of townslands in County Galway, Ireland, see List of townlands of County Galway
- Fahy, a townland in County Leitrim, Ireland, see List of townlands of County Leitrim
- Fahy, a townland in Kilfian, County Mayo, Ireland, see List of townlands of County Mayo
- Fahy, a townland in County Offaly, Ireland, see List of townlands of County Offaly
