= Henry Boguet =

French jurist and judge

Henry Boguet (1550 in Pierrecourt, Haute-Saône – 1619) was a well known jurist and judge of Saint-Claude (1596–1616) in the County of Burgundy. His renown is to a large degree based on his fame as a demonologist for his Discours exécrable des Sorciers (1602), which was reprinted twelve times in twenty years.
