= Fahy-lès-Autrey =

- Commune
- Coat of arms
- Location of Fahy-lès-Autrey
- Location within France Location within Bourgogne-Franche-Comté
- Coordinates: 47°30′49″N 5°28′57″E
- Country: France
- Region: Bourgogne-Franche-Comté
- Department: Haute-Saône
- Arrondissement: Vesoul
- Canton: Dampierre-sur-Salon
- Intercommunality: Val de Gray

Government
  - Mayor (2020–2026): Agnès Todeschini
- Area^{1}: 6.20 km^{2} (2.39 sq mi)
- Highest elevation: 278 m (912 ft)
- Lowest elevation: 224 m (735 ft)
- Population (2023): 97
  - Density: 16/km^{2} (41/sq mi)
- Time zone: UTC+01:00 (CET)
  - Summer (DST): UTC+02:00 (CEST)
- INSEE/Postal code: 70225 /70100
- ^{1} French Land Register data, which excludes lakes, ponds, glaciers > 1 km^{2} (0.386 sq mi or 247 acres) and river estuaries.

Fahy-lès-Autrey is a commune (municipality) in the Haute-Saône department in the region of Bourgogne-Franche-Comté in eastern France. It lies immediately to the west of Auvet-et-la-Chapelotte and due north of Autrey-lès-Gray.

== Population ==
Historical population
Year	Pop.	±% p.a.
1968	151	—
1975	123	−2.89%
1982	116	−0.83%
1990	105	−1.24%
1999	112	+0.72%
2007	122	+1.07%
2012	106	−2.77%
2017	112	+1.11%
2023	97	−2.37%
Source: INSEE

== See also ==
- Communes of the Haute-Saône department
