= Fleurey-lès-Lavoncourt =

- Commune
- Coat of arms
- Location of Fleurey-lès-Lavoncourt
- Location within France Location within Bourgogne-Franche-Comté
- Coordinates: 47°39′36″N 5°47′08″E
- Country: France
- Region: Bourgogne-Franche-Comté
- Department: Haute-Saône
- Arrondissement: Vesoul
- Canton: Dampierre-sur-Salon

Government
  - Mayor (2020–2026): Alain Colinet
- Area^{1}: 9.50 km^{2} (3.67 sq mi)
- Highest elevation: 267 m (876 ft)
- Lowest elevation: 210 m (690 ft)
- Population (2023): 110
  - Density: 12/km^{2} (30/sq mi)
- Time zone: UTC+01:00 (CET)
  - Summer (DST): UTC+02:00 (CEST)
- INSEE/Postal code: 70237 /70120
- ^{1} French Land Register data, which excludes lakes, ponds, glaciers > 1 km^{2} (0.386 sq mi or 247 acres) and river estuaries.

Fleurey-lès-Lavoncourt (French pronunciation: [flœʁɛ lɛ lavɔ̃kuʁ], literally Fleurey near Lavoncourt) is a commune in the Haute-Saône department in the region of Bourgogne-Franche-Comté in eastern France.

== See also ==
- Communes of the Haute-Saône department
