= Membrey (surname) =

Membrey is a surname. Notable people with the surname include:

- James Membrey (1862–1940), Australian politician
- Jordan Membrey (born 1996), Australian rules footballer
- Tim Membrey (born 1994), Australian rules footballer

== See also ==
- Membrey, commune in the Haute-Saône department in the region of Bourgogne-Franche-Comté in eastern France
