= Pierrecourt =

Pierrecourt may refer to:

- Pierrecourt, Haute-Saône, a commune in the French region of Franche-Comté
- Pierrecourt, Seine-Maritime, a commune in the French region of Haute-Normandie
