= Montot, Haute-Saône =

Montot
- Commune
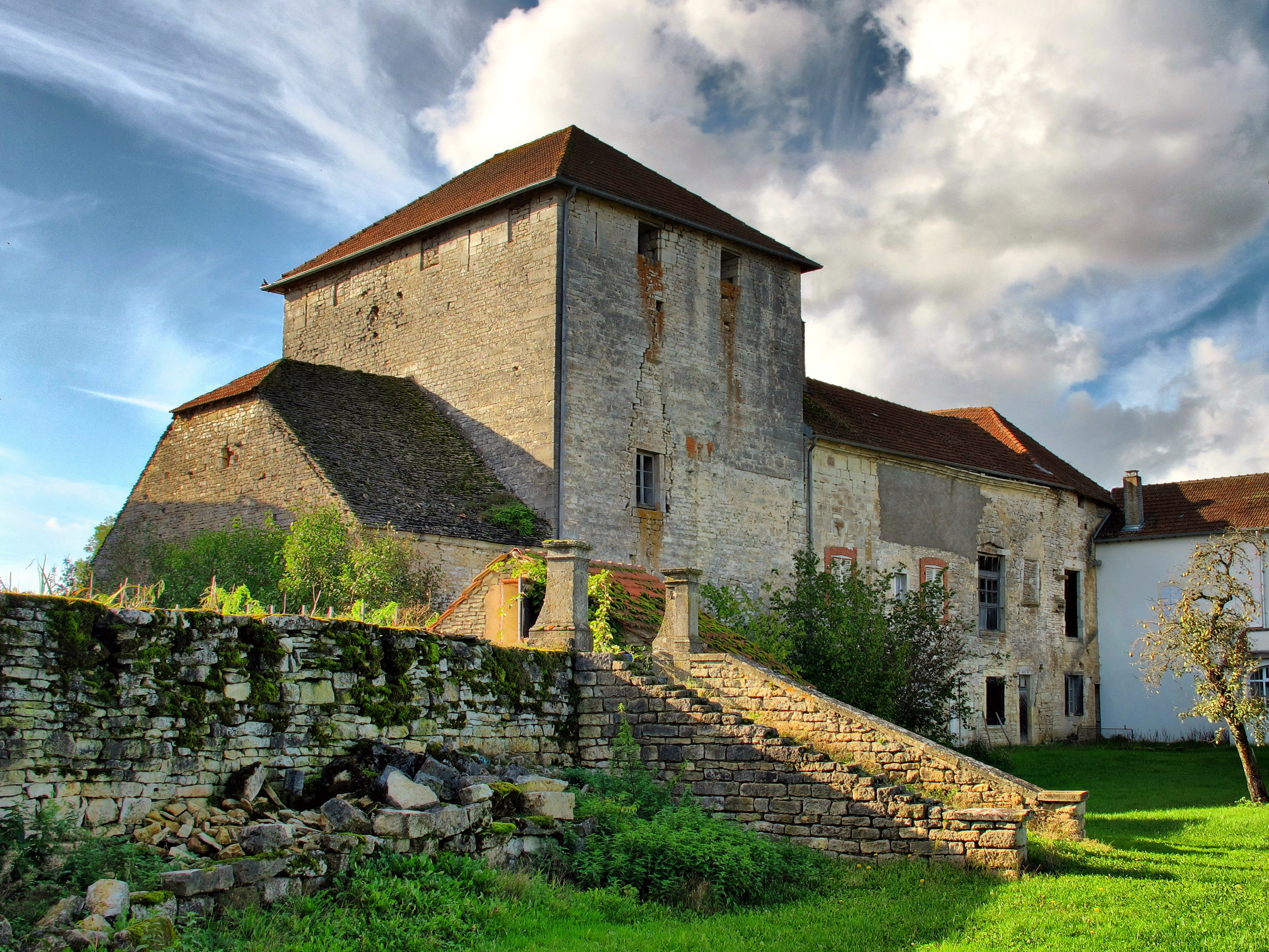
- The chateau in Montot
- Location of Montot
- Location within France Location within Bourgogne-Franche-Comté
- Coordinates: 47°33′52″N 5°37′18″E
- Country: France
- Region: Bourgogne-Franche-Comté
- Department: Haute-Saône
- Arrondissement: Vesoul
- Canton: Dampierre-sur-Salon
- Area^{1}: 10.03 km^{2} (3.87 sq mi)
- Highest elevation: 257 m (843 ft)
- Lowest elevation: 202 m (663 ft)
- Population (2023): 139
  - Density: 13.9/km^{2} (35.9/sq mi)
- Time zone: UTC+01:00 (CET)
  - Summer (DST): UTC+02:00 (CEST)
- INSEE/Postal code: 70368 /70180
- ^{1} French Land Register data, which excludes lakes, ponds, glaciers > 1 km^{2} (0.386 sq mi or 247 acres) and river estuaries.

Montot (French pronunciation: [mɔ̃to]) is a commune in the Haute-Saône department in the region of Bourgogne-Franche-Comté in eastern France.

== See also ==
- Communes of the Haute-Saône department
