= Vauconcourt-Nervezain =

- Commune
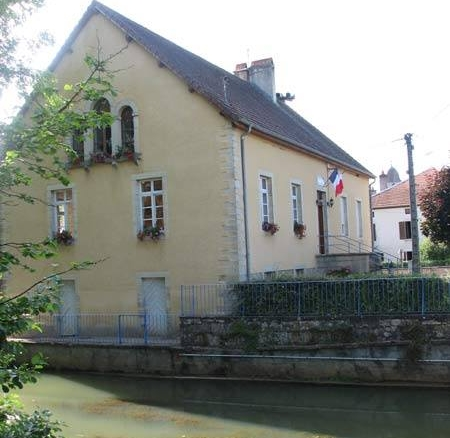
- The town hall in Vauconcourt-Nervezain

- Coat of arms
- Location of Vauconcourt-Nervezain
- Location within France Location within Bourgogne-Franche-Comté
- Coordinates: 47°39′34″N 5°49′38″E
- Country: France
- Region: Bourgogne-Franche-Comté
- Department: Haute-Saône
- Arrondissement: Vesoul
- Canton: Dampierre-sur-Salon

Government
  - Mayor (2020–2026): Dimitri Doussot
- Area^{1}: 18.43 km^{2} (7.12 sq mi)
- Highest elevation: 273 m (896 ft)
- Lowest elevation: 215 m (705 ft)
- Population (2023): 217
  - Density: 11.8/km^{2} (30.5/sq mi)
- Time zone: UTC+01:00 (CET)
  - Summer (DST): UTC+02:00 (CEST)
- INSEE/Postal code: 70525 /70120
- ^{1} French Land Register data, which excludes lakes, ponds, glaciers > 1 km^{2} (0.386 sq mi or 247 acres) and river estuaries.

Vauconcourt-Nervezain (French pronunciation: [vokɔ̃kuʁ nɛʁvəzɛ̃]) is a commune in the Haute-Saône department in the region of Bourgogne-Franche-Comté in eastern France.

== See also ==
- Communes of the Haute-Saône department
