= Francourt =

- Commune
- Location of Francourt
- Location within France Location within Bourgogne-Franche-Comté
- Coordinates: 47°39′04″N 5°44′42″E
- Country: France
- Region: Bourgogne-Franche-Comté
- Department: Haute-Saône
- Arrondissement: Vesoul
- Canton: Dampierre-sur-Salon

Government
  - Mayor (2023–2026): Françoise Busson
- Area^{1}: 7.04 km^{2} (2.72 sq mi)
- Highest elevation: 283 m (928 ft)
- Lowest elevation: 224 m (735 ft)
- Population (2023): 100
  - Density: 14/km^{2} (37/sq mi)
- Time zone: UTC+01:00 (CET)
  - Summer (DST): UTC+02:00 (CEST)
- INSEE/Postal code: 70251 /70180
- ^{1} French Land Register data, which excludes lakes, ponds, glaciers > 1 km^{2} (0.386 sq mi or 247 acres) and river estuaries.

Francourt (French pronunciation: [fʁɑ̃kuʁ]) is a commune in the Haute-Saône department in the region of Bourgogne-Franche-Comté in eastern France.

== See also ==
- Communes of the Haute-Saône department
