= Larret =

- Commune
- Location of Larret
- Location within France Location within Bourgogne-Franche-Comté
- Coordinates: 47°37′38″N 5°37′51″E
- Country: France
- Region: Bourgogne-Franche-Comté
- Department: Haute-Saône
- Arrondissement: Vesoul
- Canton: Dampierre-sur-Salon

Government
  - Mayor (2020–2026): Mickaël Mairot
- Area^{1}: 5.58 km^{2} (2.15 sq mi)
- Highest elevation: 347 m (1,138 ft)
- Lowest elevation: 229 m (751 ft)
- Population (2023): 63
  - Density: 11/km^{2} (29/sq mi)
- Time zone: UTC+01:00 (CET)
  - Summer (DST): UTC+02:00 (CEST)
- INSEE/Postal code: 70297 /70600
- ^{1} French Land Register data, which excludes lakes, ponds, glaciers > 1 km^{2} (0.386 sq mi or 247 acres) and river estuaries.

Larret (French pronunciation: [laʁɛ]) is a commune in the Haute-Saône department in the region of Bourgogne-Franche-Comté in eastern France.

== See also ==
- Communes of the Haute-Saône department
