= Poyans =

- Commune
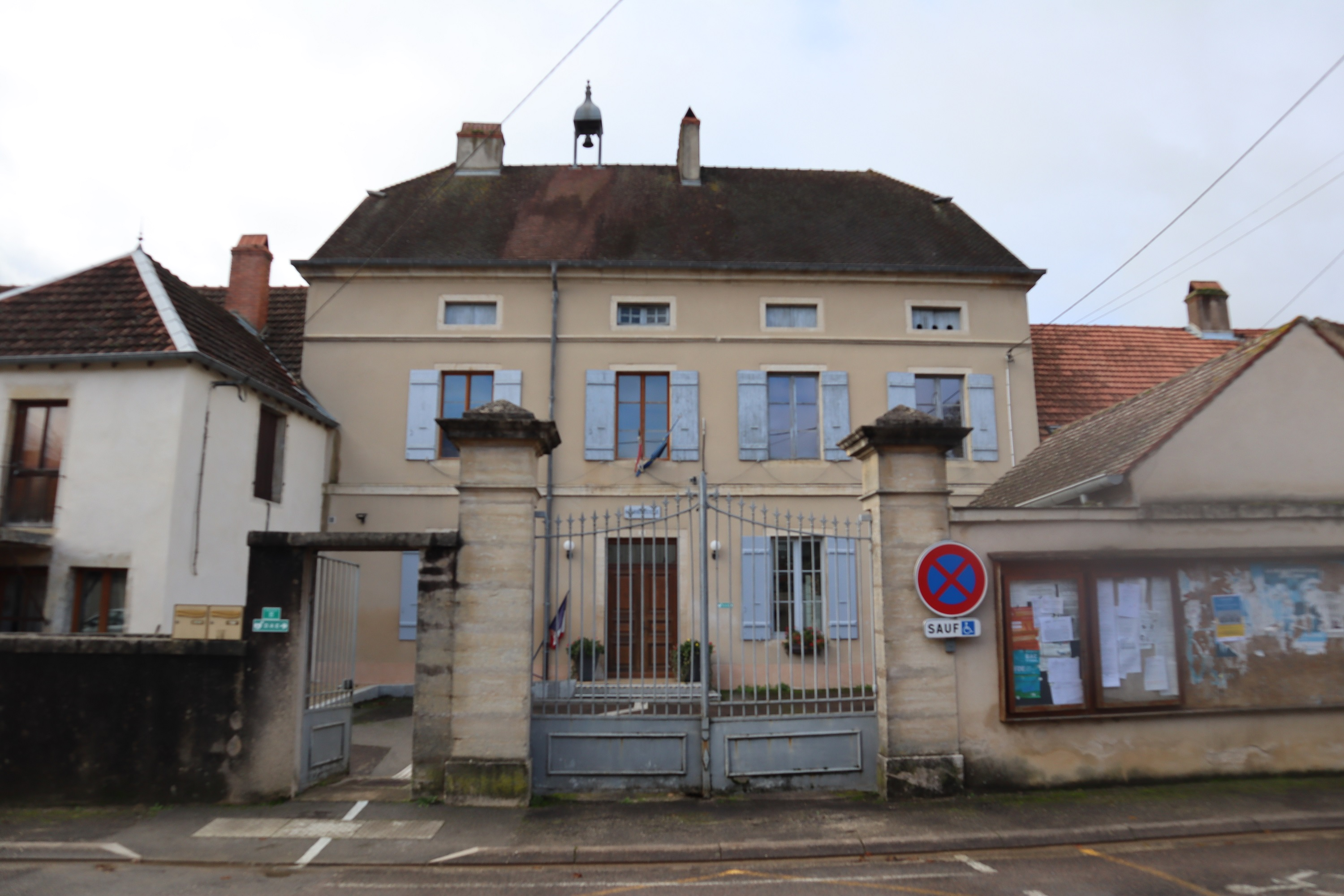
- Poyans Town hall
- Location of Poyans
- Location within France Location within Bourgogne-Franche-Comté
- Coordinates: 47°26′50″N 5°28′16″E
- Country: France
- Region: Bourgogne-Franche-Comté
- Department: Haute-Saône
- Arrondissement: Vesoul
- Canton: Dampierre-sur-Salon
- Area^{1}: 12.17 km^{2} (4.70 sq mi)
- Highest elevation: 248 m (814 ft)
- Lowest elevation: 194 m (636 ft)
- Population (2023): 143
  - Density: 11.8/km^{2} (30.4/sq mi)
- Time zone: UTC+01:00 (CET)
  - Summer (DST): UTC+02:00 (CEST)
- INSEE/Postal code: 70422 /70100
- ^{1} French Land Register data, which excludes lakes, ponds, glaciers > 1 km^{2} (0.386 sq mi or 247 acres) and river estuaries.

Poyans is a commune in the Haute-Saône department in the region of Bourgogne-Franche-Comté in eastern France.

The people are called Poyans and Poyannes, and numbered 146 in 2018. The area is 12.17 km^{2} and it is located between 194 and 248 metres above sea level.

== See also ==
- Communes of the Haute-Saône department
