= Dampierre-sur-Salon =

- Commune
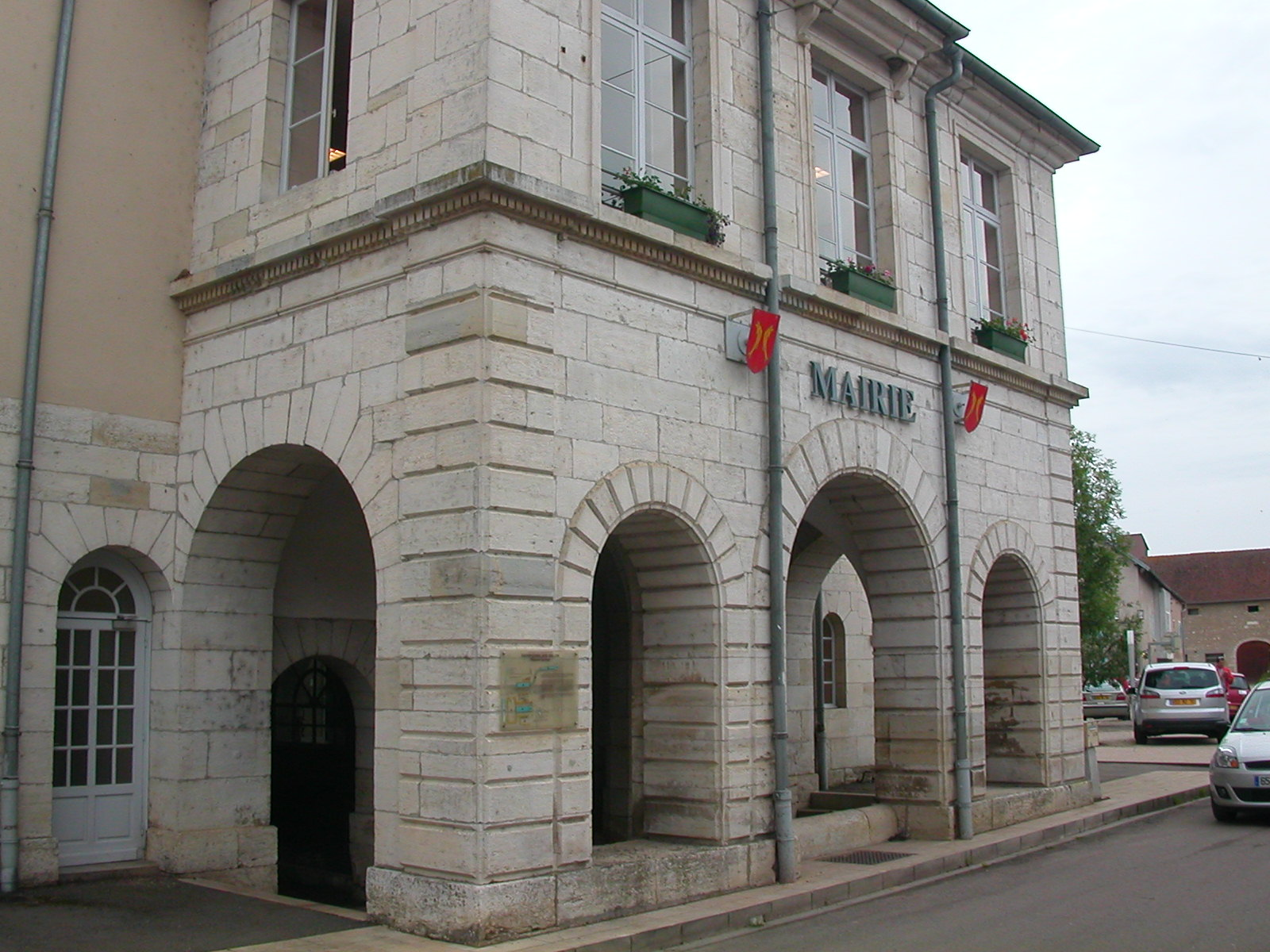
- The town hall in Dampierre-sur-Salon

- Coat of arms
- Location of Dampierre-sur-Salon
- Location within France Location within Bourgogne-Franche-Comté
- Coordinates: 47°33′28″N 5°40′51″E
- Country: France
- Region: Bourgogne-Franche-Comté
- Department: Haute-Saône
- Arrondissement: Vesoul
- Canton: Dampierre-sur-Salon

Government
  - Mayor (2020–2026): Régis Villeneuve
- Area^{1}: 18.80 km^{2} (7.26 sq mi)
- Highest elevation: 270 m (890 ft)
- Lowest elevation: 192 m (630 ft)
- Population (2023): 1,234
  - Density: 65.64/km^{2} (170.0/sq mi)
- Time zone: UTC+01:00 (CET)
  - Summer (DST): UTC+02:00 (CEST)
- INSEE/Postal code: 70198 /70180
- ^{1} French Land Register data, which excludes lakes, ponds, glaciers > 1 km^{2} (0.386 sq mi or 247 acres) and river estuaries.

Dampierre-sur-Salon (French pronunciation: [dɑ̃pjɛʁ syʁ salɔ̃]) is a commune in the Haute-Saône department in the region of Bourgogne-Franche-Comté in eastern France.

== See also ==
- Communes of the Haute-Saône department
