= Fouvent-Saint-Andoche =

- Commune
- Location of Fouvent-Saint-Andoche
- Location within France Location within Bourgogne-Franche-Comté
- Coordinates: 47°38′43″N 5°40′15″E
- Country: France
- Region: Bourgogne-Franche-Comté
- Department: Haute-Saône
- Arrondissement: Vesoul
- Canton: Dampierre-sur-Salon

Government
  - Mayor (2020–2026): Alain Aubry
- Area^{1}: 34.70 km^{2} (13.40 sq mi)
- Highest elevation: 368 m (1,207 ft)
- Lowest elevation: 212 m (696 ft)
- Population (2023): 197
  - Density: 5.68/km^{2} (14.7/sq mi)
- Time zone: UTC+01:00 (CET)
  - Summer (DST): UTC+02:00 (CEST)
- INSEE/Postal code: 70247 /70600
- ^{1} French Land Register data, which excludes lakes, ponds, glaciers > 1 km^{2} (0.386 sq mi or 247 acres) and river estuaries.

Fouvent-Saint-Andoche is a commune in the Haute-Saône department in the region of Bourgogne-Franche-Comté in eastern France.

== Places and monuments ==
- Claude Nicolas Ledoux's design, the Royal Saltworks at Arc-et-Senans (Saline royale d'Arc-et-Senans)

== See also ==
- Communes of the Haute-Saône department
