= Attricourt =

- Commune
- Coat of arms
- Location of Attricourt
- Location within France Location within Bourgogne-Franche-Comté
- Coordinates: 47°29′04″N 5°23′29″E
- Country: France
- Region: Bourgogne-Franche-Comté
- Department: Haute-Saône
- Arrondissement: Vesoul
- Canton: Dampierre-sur-Salon
- Intercommunality: CC Val de Gray

Government
  - Mayor (2020–2026): Dominique Bergerot
- Area^{1}: 6.08 km^{2} (2.35 sq mi)
- Highest elevation: 253 m (830 ft)
- Lowest elevation: 214 m (702 ft)
- Population (2023): 47
  - Density: 7.7/km^{2} (20/sq mi)
- Time zone: UTC+01:00 (CET)
  - Summer (DST): UTC+02:00 (CEST)
- INSEE/Postal code: 70032 /70100
- ^{1} French Land Register data, which excludes lakes, ponds, glaciers > 1 km^{2} (0.386 sq mi or 247 acres) and river estuaries.

Attricourt (French pronunciation: [atʁikuʁ]) is a commune in the Haute-Saône department in the region of Bourgogne-Franche-Comté in eastern France.

== See also ==
- Communes of the Haute-Saône department
