= Denèvre =

- Commune
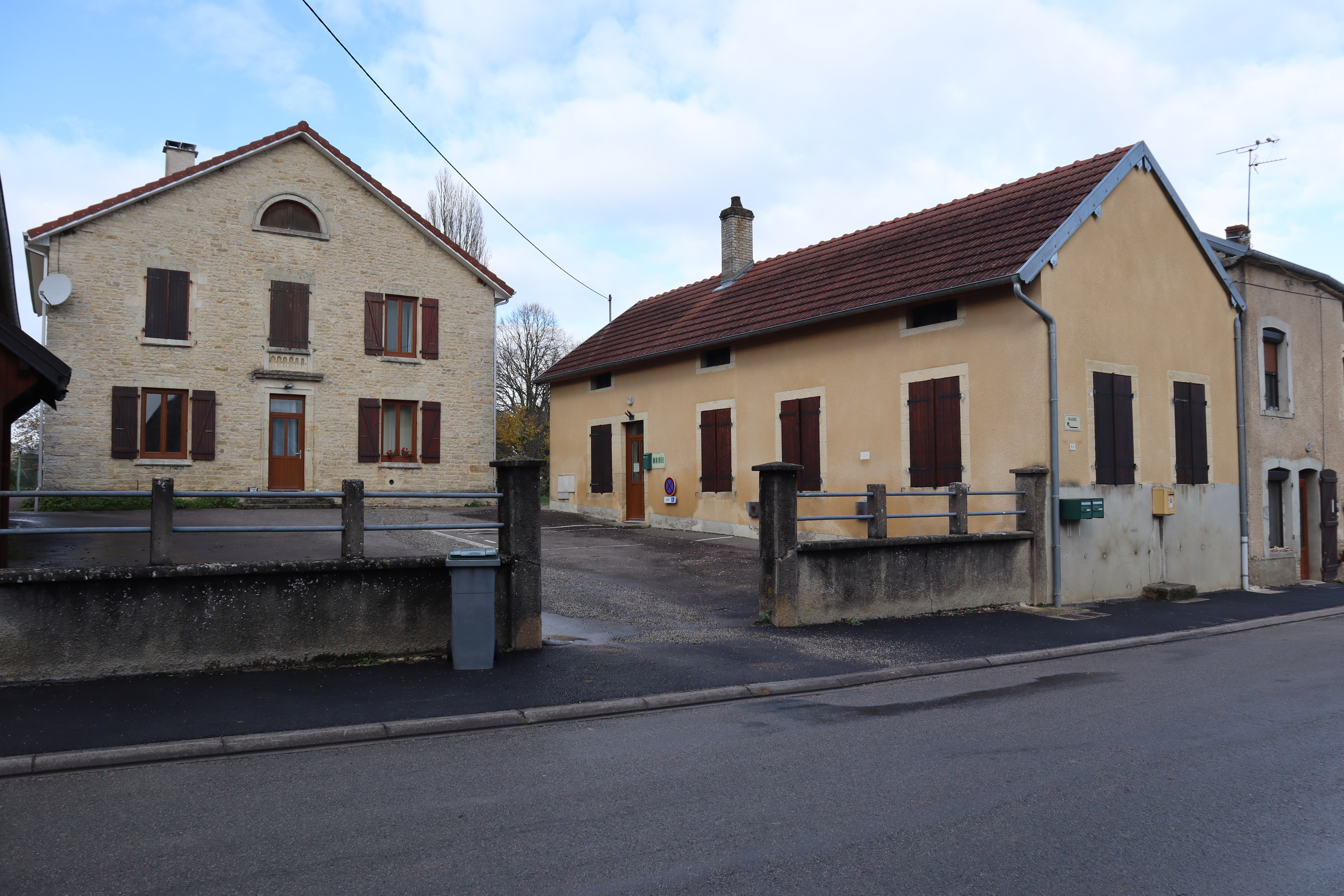
- Denèvre Town hall
- Location of Denèvre
- Location within France Location within Bourgogne-Franche-Comté
- Coordinates: 47°34′09″N 5°38′46″E
- Country: France
- Region: Bourgogne-Franche-Comté
- Department: Haute-Saône
- Arrondissement: Vesoul
- Canton: Dampierre-sur-Salon

Government
  - Mayor (2020–2026): Éric Rouhier
- Area^{1}: 5.85 km^{2} (2.26 sq mi)
- Highest elevation: 247 m (810 ft)
- Lowest elevation: 199 m (653 ft)
- Population (2023): 145
  - Density: 24.8/km^{2} (64.2/sq mi)
- Time zone: UTC+01:00 (CET)
  - Summer (DST): UTC+02:00 (CEST)
- INSEE/Postal code: 70204 /70180
- ^{1} French Land Register data, which excludes lakes, ponds, glaciers > 1 km^{2} (0.386 sq mi or 247 acres) and river estuaries.

Denèvre (French pronunciation: [dənɛvʁ]) is a commune in the Haute-Saône department in the region of Bourgogne-Franche-Comté in eastern France.

== See also ==
- Communes of the Haute-Saône department
