= Vaite =

- Commune
- Location of Vaite
- Location within France Location within Bourgogne-Franche-Comté
- Coordinates: 47°35′33″N 5°43′45″E
- Country: France
- Region: Bourgogne-Franche-Comté
- Department: Haute-Saône
- Arrondissement: Vesoul
- Canton: Dampierre-sur-Salon

Government
  - Mayor (2020–2026): Joël Baugey
- Area^{1}: 9.39 km^{2} (3.63 sq mi)
- Highest elevation: 264 m (866 ft)
- Lowest elevation: 199 m (653 ft)
- Population (2023): 224
  - Density: 23.9/km^{2} (61.8/sq mi)
- Time zone: UTC+01:00 (CET)
  - Summer (DST): UTC+02:00 (CEST)
- INSEE/Postal code: 70511 /70180
- ^{1} French Land Register data, which excludes lakes, ponds, glaciers > 1 km^{2} (0.386 sq mi or 247 acres) and river estuaries.

Vaite (French pronunciation: [vɛt]) is a commune in the Haute-Saône department in the region of Bourgogne-Franche-Comté in eastern France.

== See also ==
- Communes of the Haute-Saône department
