= Autet =

- Commune
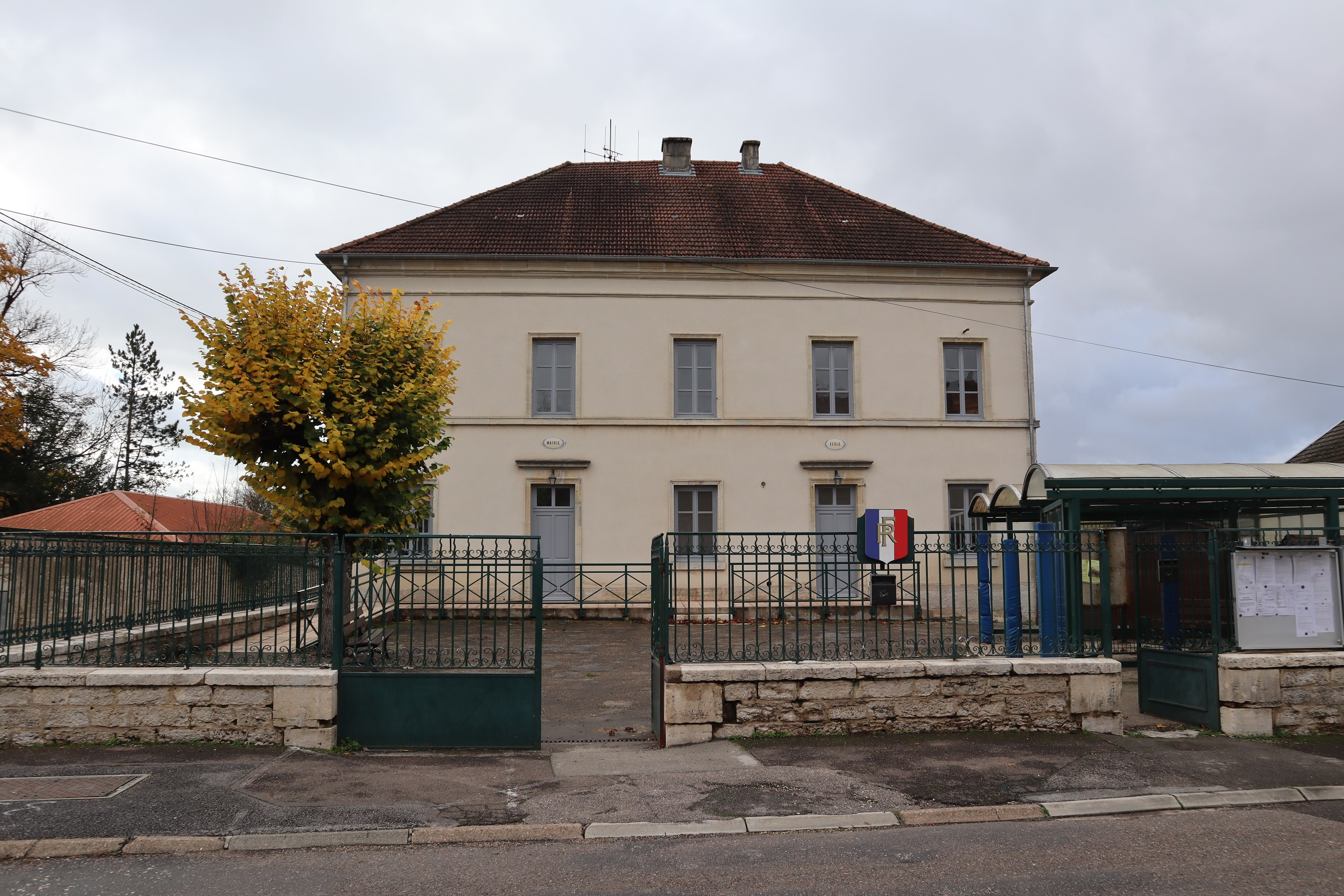
- The town hall in Autet
- Location of Autet
- Location within France Location within Bourgogne-Franche-Comté
- Coordinates: 47°32′36″N 5°41′42″E
- Country: France
- Region: Bourgogne-Franche-Comté
- Department: Haute-Saône
- Arrondissement: Vesoul
- Canton: Dampierre-sur-Salon
- Intercommunality: CC Quatre Rivières

Government
  - Mayor (2020–2026): Dominique Perilloux
- Area^{1}: 11.35 km^{2} (4.38 sq mi)
- Highest elevation: 248 m (814 ft)
- Lowest elevation: 191 m (627 ft)
- Population (2023): 269
  - Density: 23.7/km^{2} (61.4/sq mi)
- Time zone: UTC+01:00 (CET)
  - Summer (DST): UTC+02:00 (CEST)
- INSEE/Postal code: 70037 /70180
- ^{1} French Land Register data, which excludes lakes, ponds, glaciers > 1 km^{2} (0.386 sq mi or 247 acres) and river estuaries.

Autet (French pronunciation: [otɛ]) is a commune in the Haute-Saône department in the region of Bourgogne-Franche-Comté in eastern France.

== See also ==
- Communes of the Haute-Saône department
