= Courtesoult-et-Gatey =

- Commune
- Coat of arms
- Location of Courtesoult-et-Gatey
- Location within France Location within Bourgogne-Franche-Comté
- Coordinates: 47°37′07″N 5°37′18″E
- Country: France
- Region: Bourgogne-Franche-Comté
- Department: Haute-Saône
- Arrondissement: Vesoul
- Canton: Dampierre-sur-Salon
- Area^{1}: 10.17 km^{2} (3.93 sq mi)
- Highest elevation: 309 m (1,014 ft)
- Lowest elevation: 214 m (702 ft)
- Population (2023): 58
  - Density: 5.7/km^{2} (15/sq mi)
- Time zone: UTC+01:00 (CET)
  - Summer (DST): UTC+02:00 (CEST)
- INSEE/Postal code: 70183 /70600
- ^{1} French Land Register data, which excludes lakes, ponds, glaciers > 1 km^{2} (0.386 sq mi or 247 acres) and river estuaries.

Courtesoult-et-Gatey is a commune in the Haute-Saône department in the region of Bourgogne-Franche-Comté in eastern France.

== See also ==
- Communes of the Haute-Saône department
