= Percey-le-Grand =

- Commune
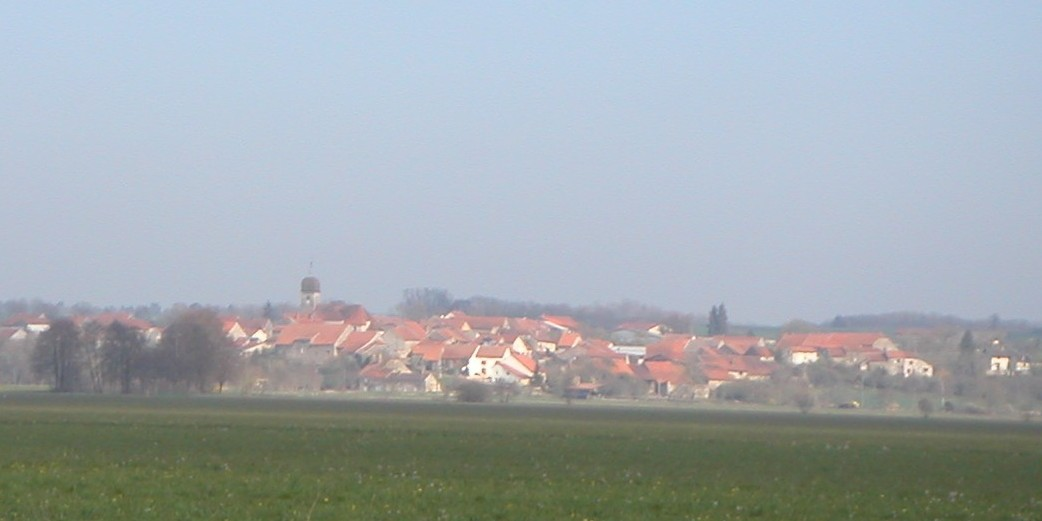
- A general view of Percey-le-Grand
- Location of Percey-le-Grand
- Location within France Location within Bourgogne-Franche-Comté
- Coordinates: 47°36′36″N 5°23′29″E
- Country: France
- Region: Bourgogne-Franche-Comté
- Department: Haute-Saône
- Arrondissement: Vesoul
- Canton: Dampierre-sur-Salon

Government
  - Mayor (2023–2026): Jean-Pierre Rebilly
- Area^{1}: 13.88 km^{2} (5.36 sq mi)
- Highest elevation: 334 m (1,096 ft)
- Lowest elevation: 238 m (781 ft)
- Population (2023): 84
  - Density: 6.1/km^{2} (16/sq mi)
- Time zone: UTC+01:00 (CET)
  - Summer (DST): UTC+02:00 (CEST)
- INSEE/Postal code: 70406 /70600
- ^{1} French Land Register data, which excludes lakes, ponds, glaciers > 1 km^{2} (0.386 sq mi or 247 acres) and river estuaries.

Percey-le-Grand (French pronunciation: [pɛʁsɛ lə ɡʁɑ̃]) is a commune in the Haute-Saône department in the region of Bourgogne-Franche-Comté in eastern France.

== See also ==
- Communes of the Haute-Saône department
