= Delain, Haute-Saône =

Delain
- Commune
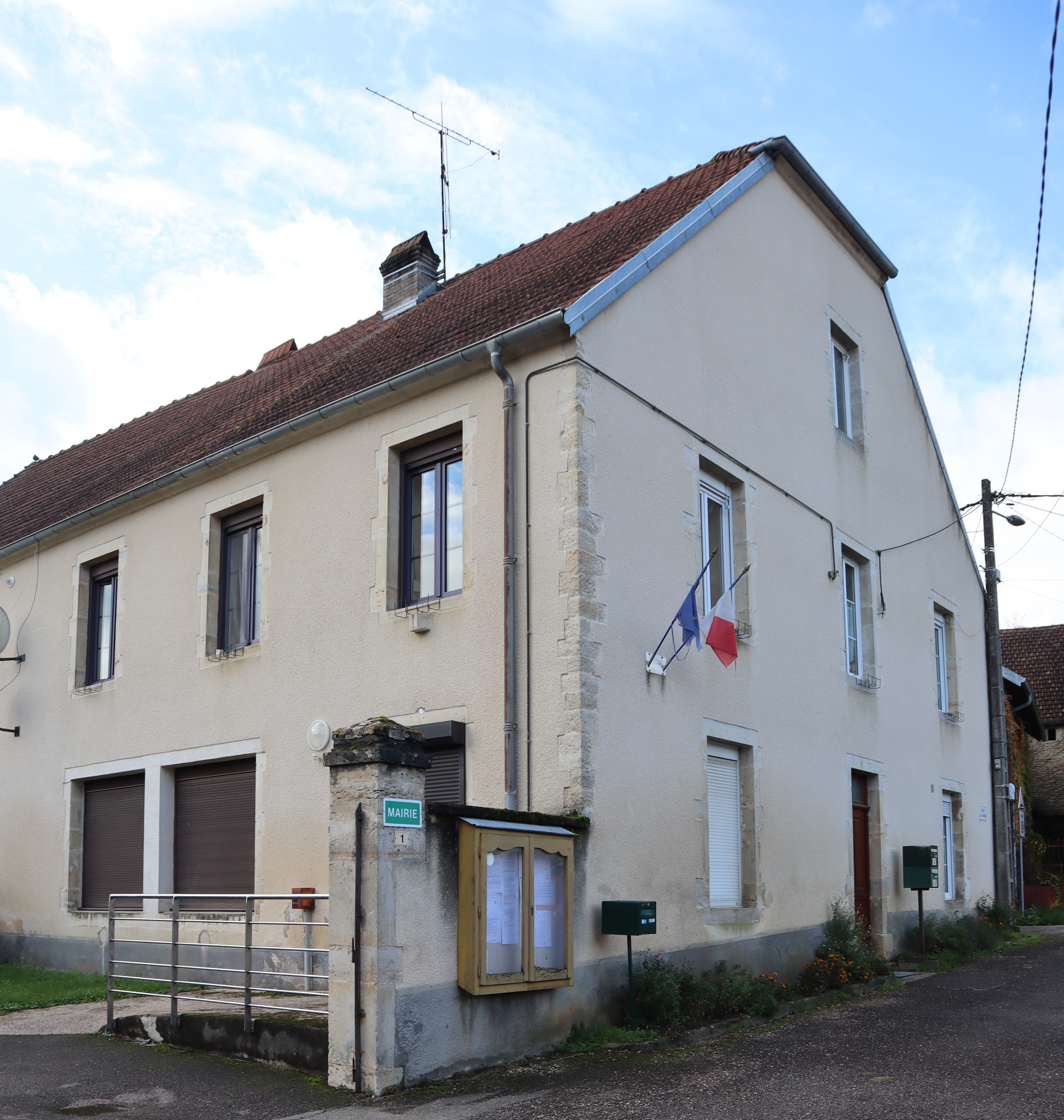
- Delain Town hall
- Location of Delain
- Location within France Location within Bourgogne-Franche-Comté
- Coordinates: 47°34′40″N 5°38′14″E
- Country: France
- Region: Bourgogne-Franche-Comté
- Department: Haute-Saône
- Arrondissement: Vesoul
- Canton: Dampierre-sur-Salon

Government
  - Mayor (2020–2026): Jean Allemand
- Area^{1}: 12.20 km^{2} (4.71 sq mi)
- Highest elevation: 268 m (879 ft)
- Lowest elevation: 200 m (660 ft)
- Population (2023): 186
  - Density: 15.2/km^{2} (39.5/sq mi)
- Time zone: UTC+01:00 (CET)
  - Summer (DST): UTC+02:00 (CEST)
- INSEE/Postal code: 70201 /70180
- ^{1} French Land Register data, which excludes lakes, ponds, glaciers > 1 km^{2} (0.386 sq mi or 247 acres) and river estuaries.

Delain (French pronunciation: [dəlɛ̃]) is a commune in the Haute-Saône department in the region of Bourgogne-Franche-Comté in eastern France.

== See also ==
- Communes of the Haute-Saône department
