= Vanne =

- Commune
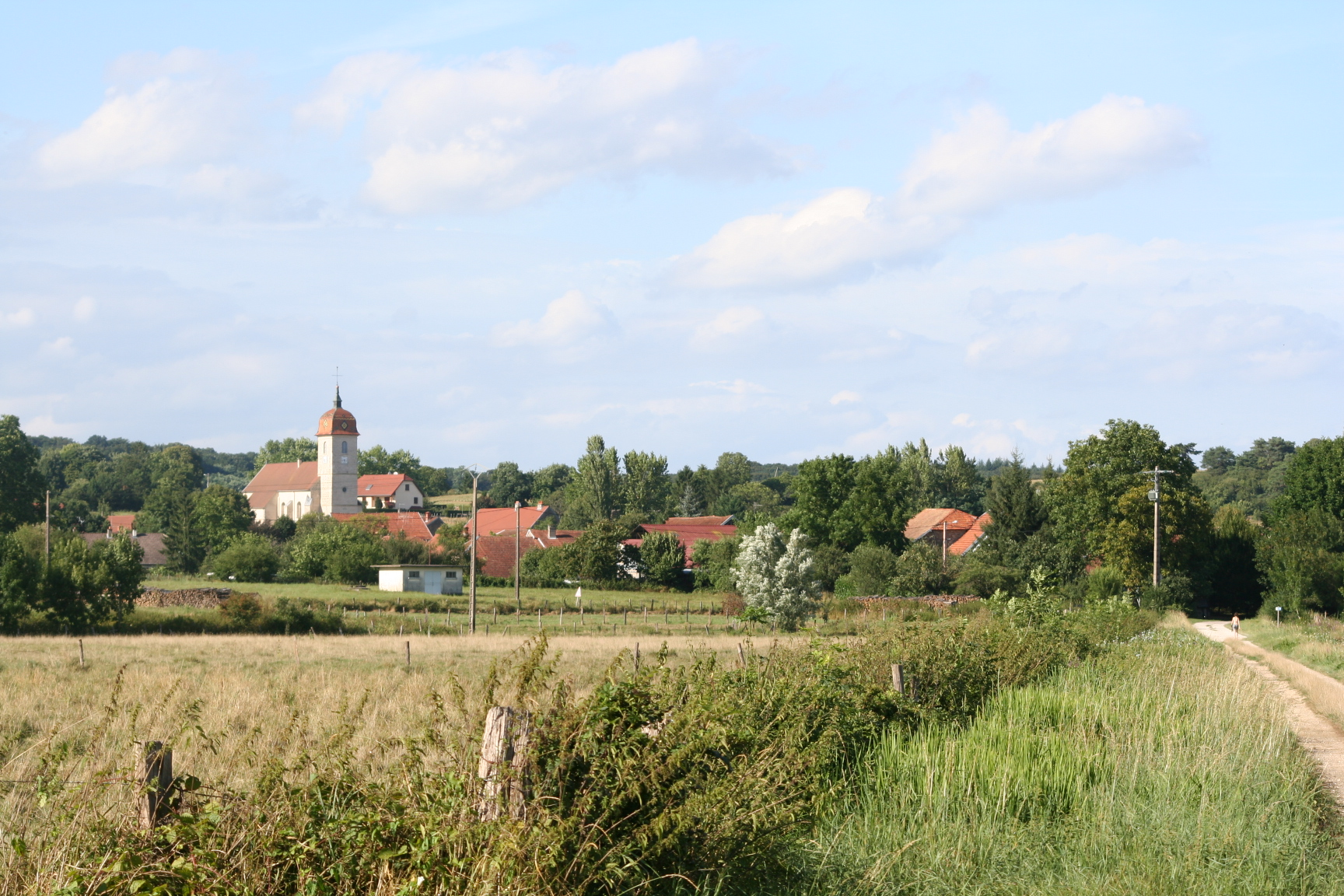
- A general view of Vanne

- Coat of arms
- Location of Vanne
- Location within France Location within Bourgogne-Franche-Comté
- Coordinates: 47°36′20″N 5°50′23″E
- Country: France
- Region: Bourgogne-Franche-Comté
- Department: Haute-Saône
- Arrondissement: Vesoul
- Canton: Dampierre-sur-Salon

Government
  - Mayor (2020–2026): Joël Mongin
- Area^{1}: 9.72 km^{2} (3.75 sq mi)
- Highest elevation: 264 m (866 ft)
- Lowest elevation: 197 m (646 ft)
- Population (2023): 123
  - Density: 12.7/km^{2} (32.8/sq mi)
- Time zone: UTC+01:00 (CET)
  - Summer (DST): UTC+02:00 (CEST)
- INSEE/Postal code: 70520 /70130
- ^{1} French Land Register data, which excludes lakes, ponds, glaciers > 1 km^{2} (0.386 sq mi or 247 acres) and river estuaries.

Vanne (French pronunciation: [van]) is a commune in the Haute-Saône department in the region of Bourgogne-Franche-Comté in eastern France.

== See also ==
- Communes of the Haute-Saône department
