= Rigny =

- Commune
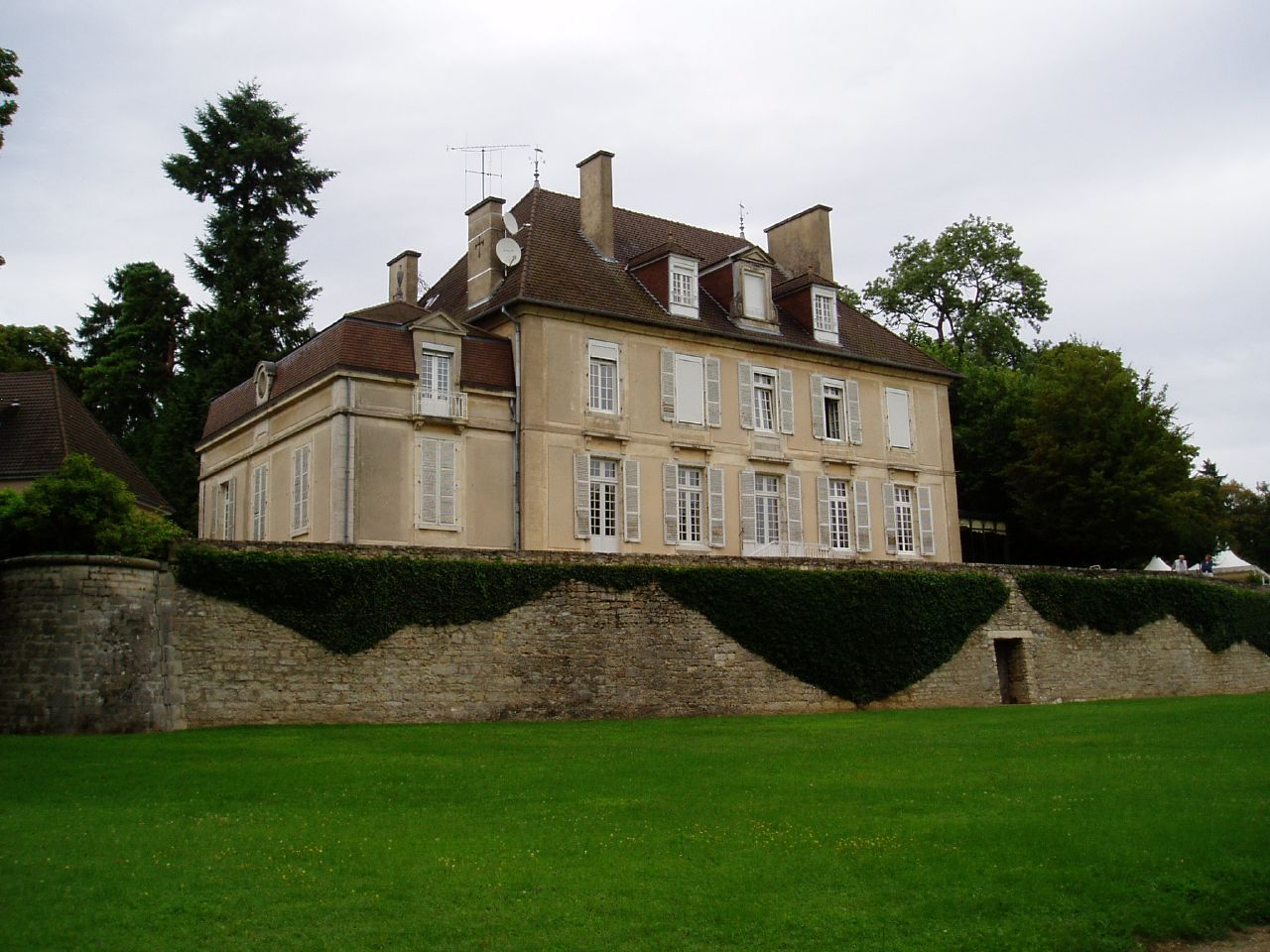
- The chateau in Rigny

- Coat of arms
- Location of Rigny
- Location within France Location within Bourgogne-Franche-Comté
- Coordinates: 47°28′24″N 5°38′02″E
- Country: France
- Region: Bourgogne-Franche-Comté
- Department: Haute-Saône
- Arrondissement: Vesoul
- Canton: Dampierre-sur-Salon

Government
  - Mayor (2020–2026): Alain Blinette
- Area^{1}: 12.72 km^{2} (4.91 sq mi)
- Highest elevation: 246 m (807 ft)
- Lowest elevation: 189 m (620 ft)
- Population (2023): 636
  - Density: 50.0/km^{2} (129/sq mi)
- Time zone: UTC+01:00 (CET)
  - Summer (DST): UTC+02:00 (CEST)
- INSEE/Postal code: 70446 /70100
- ^{1} French Land Register data, which excludes lakes, ponds, glaciers > 1 km^{2} (0.386 sq mi or 247 acres) and river estuaries.

Rigny (French pronunciation: [ʁiɲi]) is a commune in the Haute-Saône department in the region of Bourgogne-Franche-Comté in eastern France.

== See also ==
- Communes of the Haute-Saône department
