= Achey =

- Commune
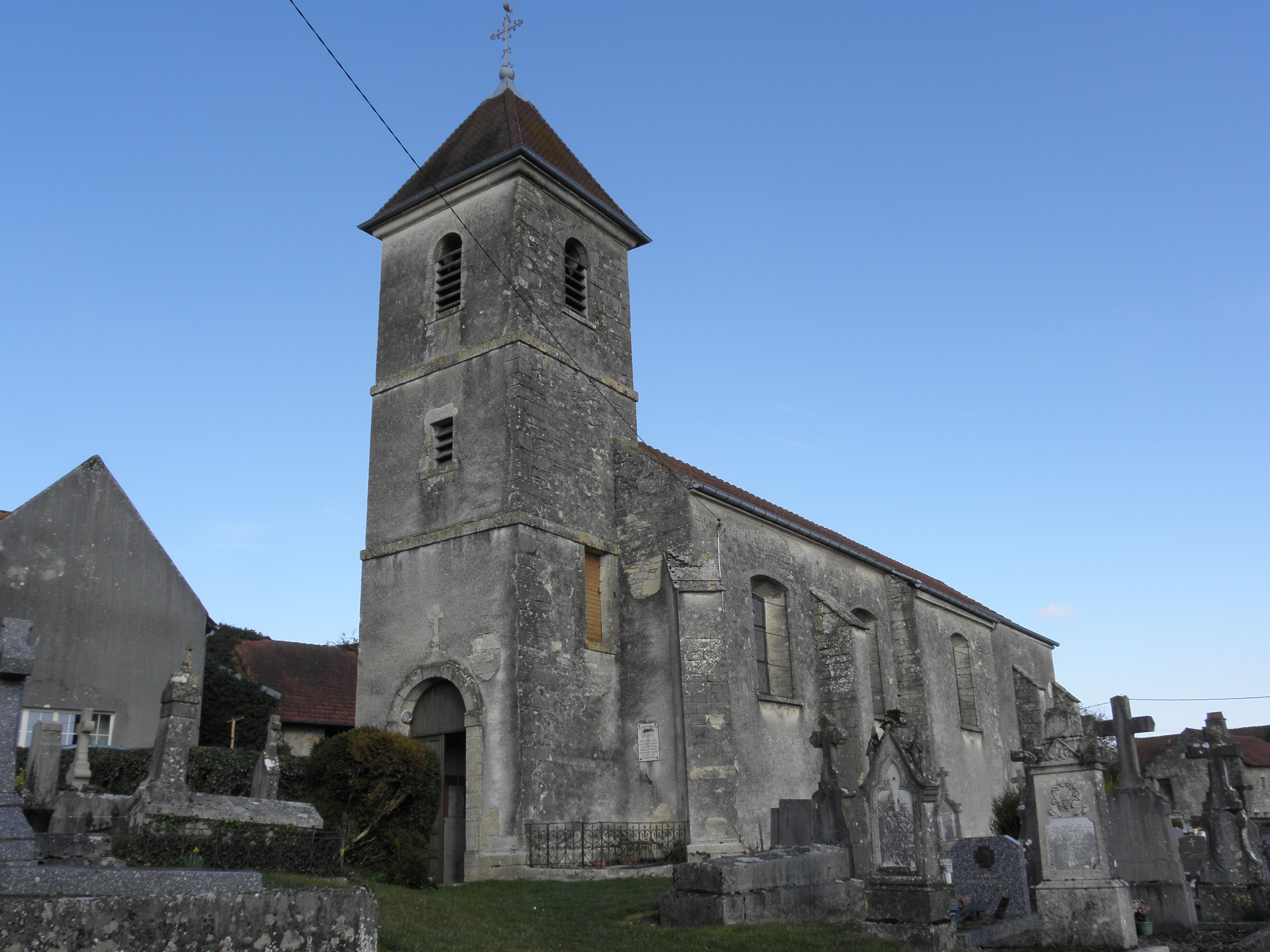
- The church in Achey
- Location of Achey
- Location within France Location within Bourgogne-Franche-Comté
- Coordinates: 47°34′29″N 5°36′30″E
- Country: France
- Region: Bourgogne-Franche-Comté
- Department: Haute-Saône
- Arrondissement: Vesoul
- Canton: Dampierre-sur-Salon
- Intercommunality: Quatre Rivières

Government
  - Mayor (2020–2026): Claude Bourrier
- Area^{1}: 7.05 km^{2} (2.72 sq mi)
- Highest elevation: 258 m (846 ft)
- Lowest elevation: 206 m (676 ft)
- Population (2023): 71
  - Density: 10/km^{2} (26/sq mi)
- Time zone: UTC+01:00 (CET)
  - Summer (DST): UTC+02:00 (CEST)
- INSEE/Postal code: 70003 /70180
- ^{1} French Land Register data, which excludes lakes, ponds, glaciers > 1 km^{2} (0.386 sq mi or 247 acres) and river estuaries.

Achey (French pronunciation: [aʃɛ]) is a commune in the Haute-Saône département in the region of Bourgogne-Franche-Comté in eastern France.

== Population ==
Historical population
Year	Pop.	±% p.a.
1968	94	—
1975	75	−3.17%
1982	74	−0.19%
1990	63	−1.99%
1999	55	−1.50%
2007	70	+3.06%
2012	77	+1.92%
2017	70	−1.89%
2023	71	+0.24%
Source: INSEE

== See also ==
- Communes of the Haute-Saône department
