= Roche-et-Raucourt =

- Commune
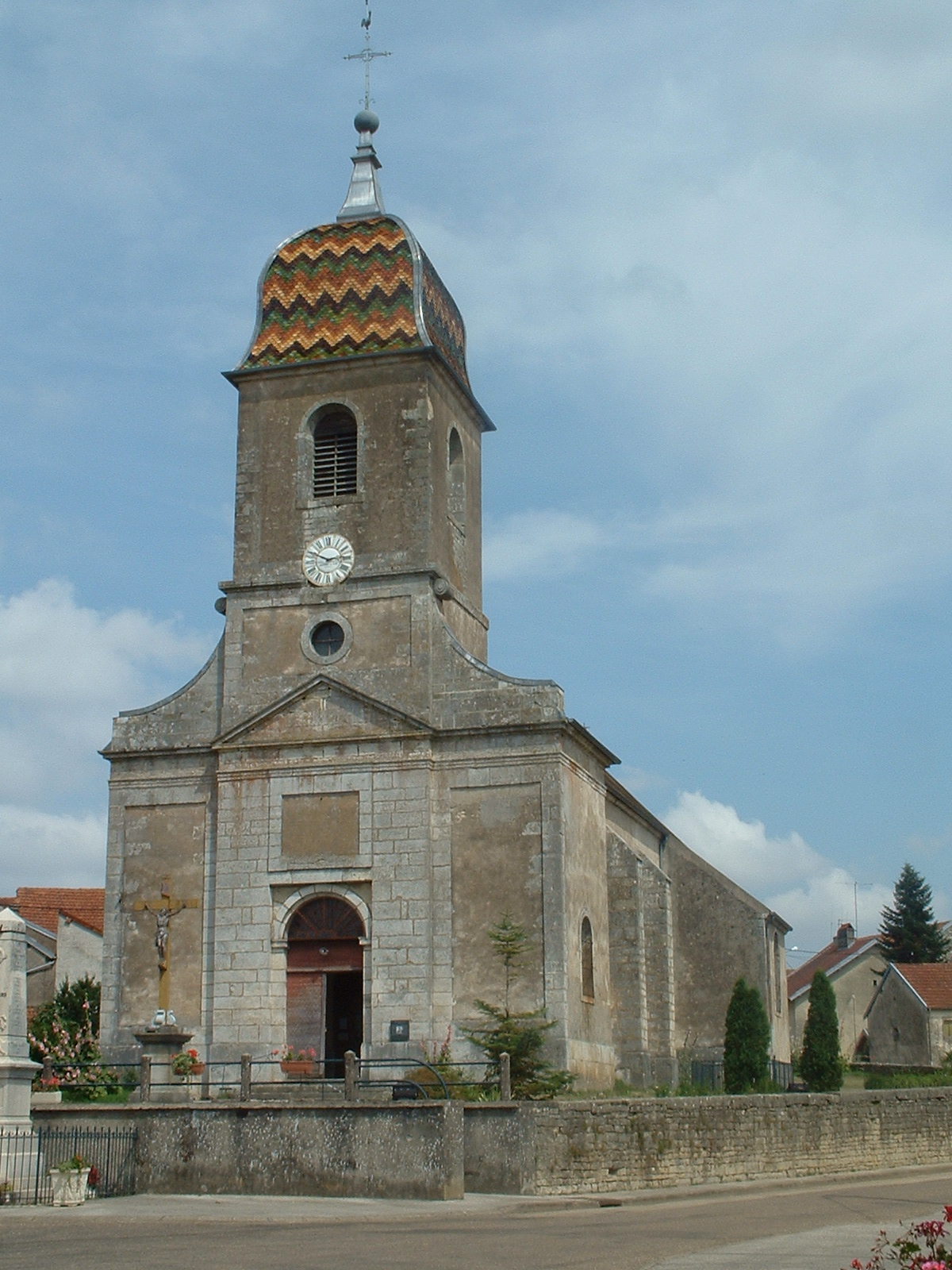
- The church in Roche-et-Raucourt

- Coat of arms
- Location of Roche-et-Raucourt
- Location within France Location within Bourgogne-Franche-Comté
- Coordinates: 47°37′15″N 5°42′29″E
- Country: France
- Region: Bourgogne-Franche-Comté
- Department: Haute-Saône
- Arrondissement: Vesoul
- Canton: Dampierre-sur-Salon

Government
  - Mayor (2020–2026): David Rubio
- Area^{1}: 13.38 km^{2} (5.17 sq mi)
- Highest elevation: 264 m (866 ft)
- Lowest elevation: 205 m (673 ft)
- Population (2023): 153
  - Density: 11.4/km^{2} (29.6/sq mi)
- Time zone: UTC+01:00 (CET)
  - Summer (DST): UTC+02:00 (CEST)
- INSEE/Postal code: 70448 /70180
- ^{1} French Land Register data, which excludes lakes, ponds, glaciers > 1 km^{2} (0.386 sq mi or 247 acres) and river estuaries.

Roche-et-Raucourt (French pronunciation: [ʁɔʃ e ʁokuʁ]) is a commune in the Haute-Saône department in the region of Bourgogne-Franche-Comté in eastern France.

== Population ==
Year	Total
2006	153
1999	175
1990	190

== Sights ==
- Church of the 18th century, by the architect Claude Nicolas Ledoux.
- Washing places in Roche and in Raucourt
- Fountain St Didier
- Fort in Raucourt
- Chapels St Roch and St Claude

== See also ==
- Communes of the Haute-Saône department
