= Mont-Saint-Léger =

- Commune
- Coat of arms
- Location of Mont-Saint-Léger
- Location within France Location within Bourgogne-Franche-Comté
- Coordinates: 47°37′51″N 5°47′30″E
- Country: France
- Region: Bourgogne-Franche-Comté
- Department: Haute-Saône
- Arrondissement: Vesoul
- Canton: Dampierre-sur-Salon

Government
  - Mayor (2020–2026): Joël Garnery
- Area^{1}: 4.90 km^{2} (1.89 sq mi)
- Highest elevation: 282 m (925 ft)
- Lowest elevation: 207 m (679 ft)
- Population (2023): 49
  - Density: 10/km^{2} (26/sq mi)
- Time zone: UTC+01:00 (CET)
  - Summer (DST): UTC+02:00 (CEST)
- INSEE/Postal code: 70369 /70120
- ^{1} French Land Register data, which excludes lakes, ponds, glaciers > 1 km^{2} (0.386 sq mi or 247 acres) and river estuaries.

Mont-Saint-Léger (French pronunciation: [mɔ̃ sɛ̃ leʒe]) is a commune in the Haute-Saône department in the region of Bourgogne-Franche-Comté in eastern France.
