= Ferrières-lès-Ray =

- Commune
- Location of Ferrières-lès-Ray
- Location within France Location within Bourgogne-Franche-Comté
- Coordinates: 47°34′52″N 5°48′16″E
- Country: France
- Region: Bourgogne-Franche-Comté
- Department: Haute-Saône
- Arrondissement: Vesoul
- Canton: Dampierre-sur-Salon
- Area^{1}: 4.00 km^{2} (1.54 sq mi)
- Highest elevation: 231 m (758 ft)
- Lowest elevation: 197 m (646 ft)
- Population (2023): 41
  - Density: 10/km^{2} (27/sq mi)
- Time zone: UTC+01:00 (CET)
  - Summer (DST): UTC+02:00 (CEST)
- INSEE/Postal code: 70231 /70130
- ^{1} French Land Register data, which excludes lakes, ponds, glaciers > 1 km^{2} (0.386 sq mi or 247 acres) and river estuaries.

Ferrières-lès-Ray is a commune in the Haute-Saône department in the region of Bourgogne-Franche-Comté in eastern France.

== See also ==
- Communes of the Haute-Saône department
