= Broye-les-Loups-et-Verfontaine =

- Commune
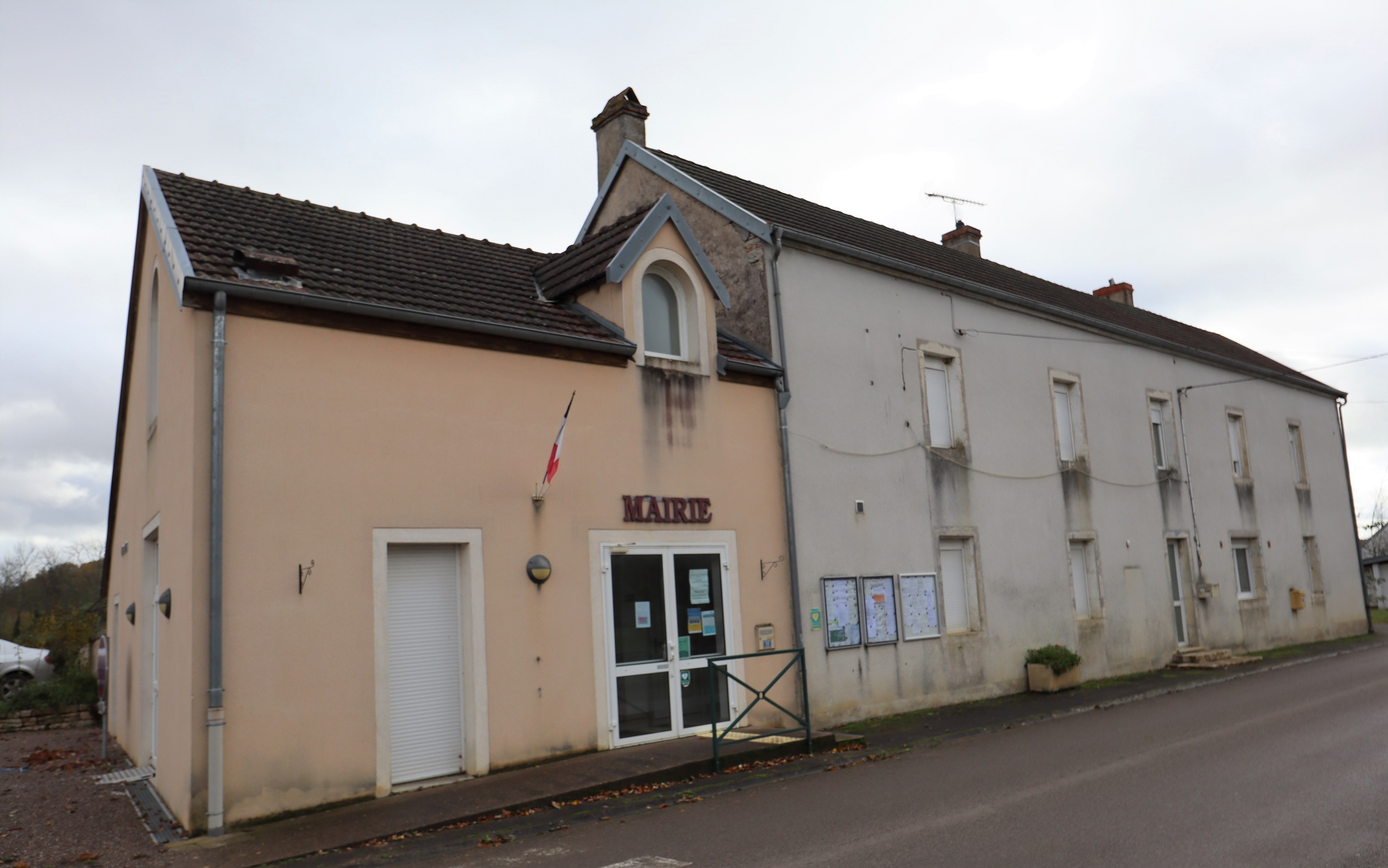
- Broye-les-Loups-et-Verfontaine Town hall
- Location of Broye-les-Loups-et-Verfontaine
- Location within France Location within Bourgogne-Franche-Comté
- Coordinates: 47°27′56″N 5°25′29″E
- Country: France
- Region: Bourgogne-Franche-Comté
- Department: Haute-Saône
- Arrondissement: Vesoul
- Canton: Dampierre-sur-Salon

Government
  - Mayor (2020–2026): Alain Nicolle
- Area^{1}: 7.00 km^{2} (2.70 sq mi)
- Highest elevation: 254 m (833 ft)
- Lowest elevation: 213 m (699 ft)
- Population (2023): 112
  - Density: 16.0/km^{2} (41.4/sq mi)
- Time zone: UTC+01:00 (CET)
  - Summer (DST): UTC+02:00 (CEST)
- INSEE/Postal code: 70100 /70100
- ^{1} French Land Register data, which excludes lakes, ponds, glaciers > 1 km^{2} (0.386 sq mi or 247 acres) and river estuaries.

Broye-les-Loups-et-Verfontaine (French pronunciation: [bʁwa le lu e vɛʁfɔ̃tɛn]) is a commune in the Haute-Saône department in the region of Bourgogne-Franche-Comté in eastern France.

== See also ==
- Communes of the Haute-Saône department
