= Oyrières =

- Commune
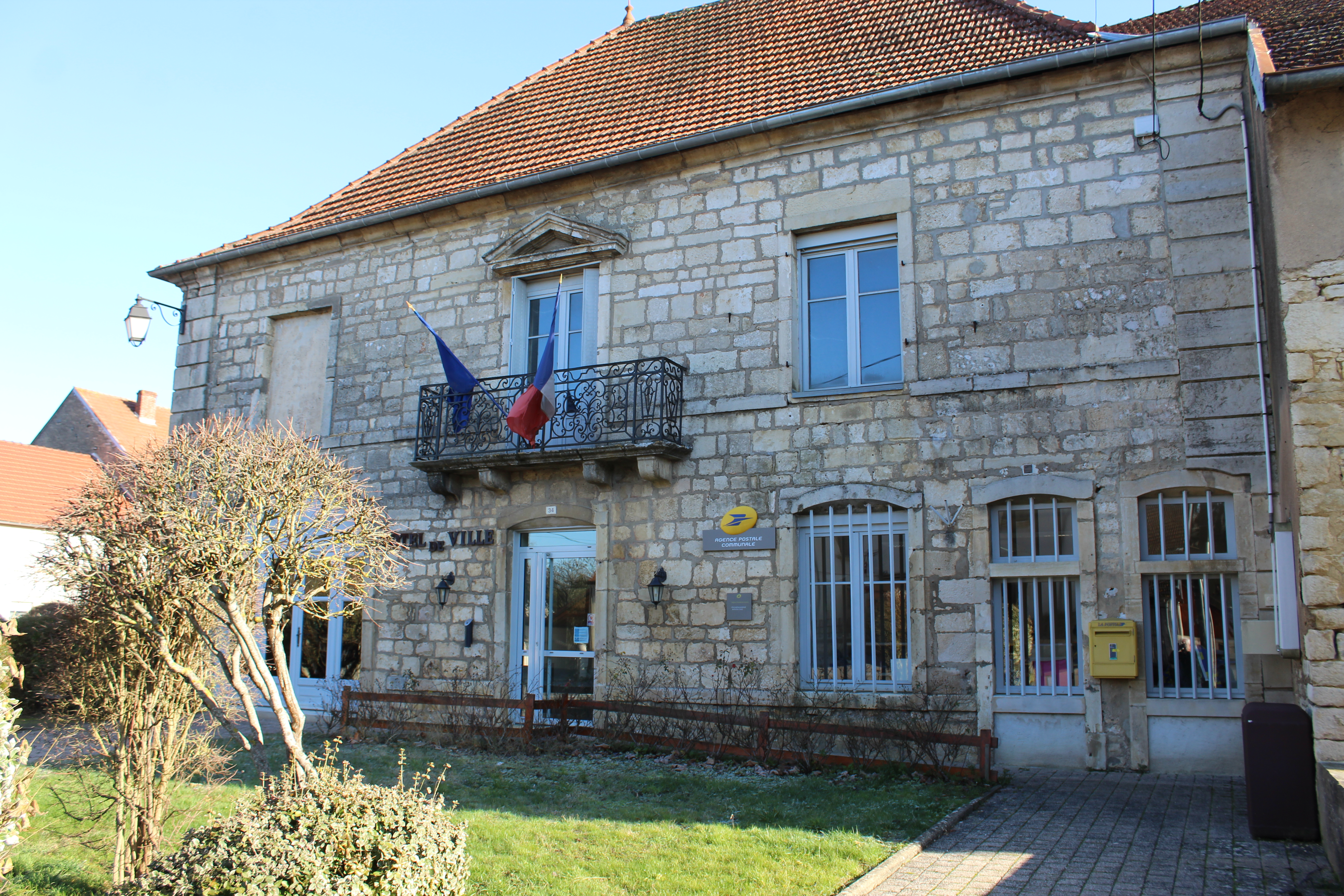
- The town hall in Oyrières
- Location of Oyrières
- Location within France Location within Bourgogne-Franche-Comté
- Coordinates: 47°32′00″N 5°33′52″E
- Country: France
- Region: Bourgogne-Franche-Comté
- Department: Haute-Saône
- Arrondissement: Vesoul
- Canton: Dampierre-sur-Salon
- Area^{1}: 14.03 km^{2} (5.42 sq mi)
- Highest elevation: 255 m (837 ft)
- Lowest elevation: 202 m (663 ft)
- Population (2023): 365
  - Density: 26.0/km^{2} (67.4/sq mi)
- Time zone: UTC+01:00 (CET)
  - Summer (DST): UTC+02:00 (CEST)
- INSEE/Postal code: 70402 /70600
- ^{1} French Land Register data, which excludes lakes, ponds, glaciers > 1 km^{2} (0.386 sq mi or 247 acres) and river estuaries.

Oyrières is a commune in the Haute-Saône department in the region of Bourgogne-Franche-Comté in eastern France.

== See also ==
- Communes of the Haute-Saône department
