= Villers-Vaudey =

- Commune
- Location of Villers-Vaudey
- Location within France Location within Bourgogne-Franche-Comté
- Coordinates: 47°40′24″N 5°45′35″E
- Country: France
- Region: Bourgogne-Franche-Comté
- Department: Haute-Saône
- Arrondissement: Vesoul
- Canton: Dampierre-sur-Salon
- Area^{1}: 5.55 km^{2} (2.14 sq mi)
- Highest elevation: 306 m (1,004 ft)
- Lowest elevation: 234 m (768 ft)
- Population (2023): 58
  - Density: 10/km^{2} (27/sq mi)
- Time zone: UTC+01:00 (CET)
  - Summer (DST): UTC+02:00 (CEST)
- INSEE/Postal code: 70568 /70120
- ^{1} French Land Register data, which excludes lakes, ponds, glaciers > 1 km^{2} (0.386 sq mi or 247 acres) and river estuaries.

Villers-Vaudey is a commune in the Haute-Saône department in the region of Bourgogne-Franche-Comté in eastern France.

== See also ==
- Communes of the Haute-Saône department
