= Montureux-et-Prantigny =

- Commune
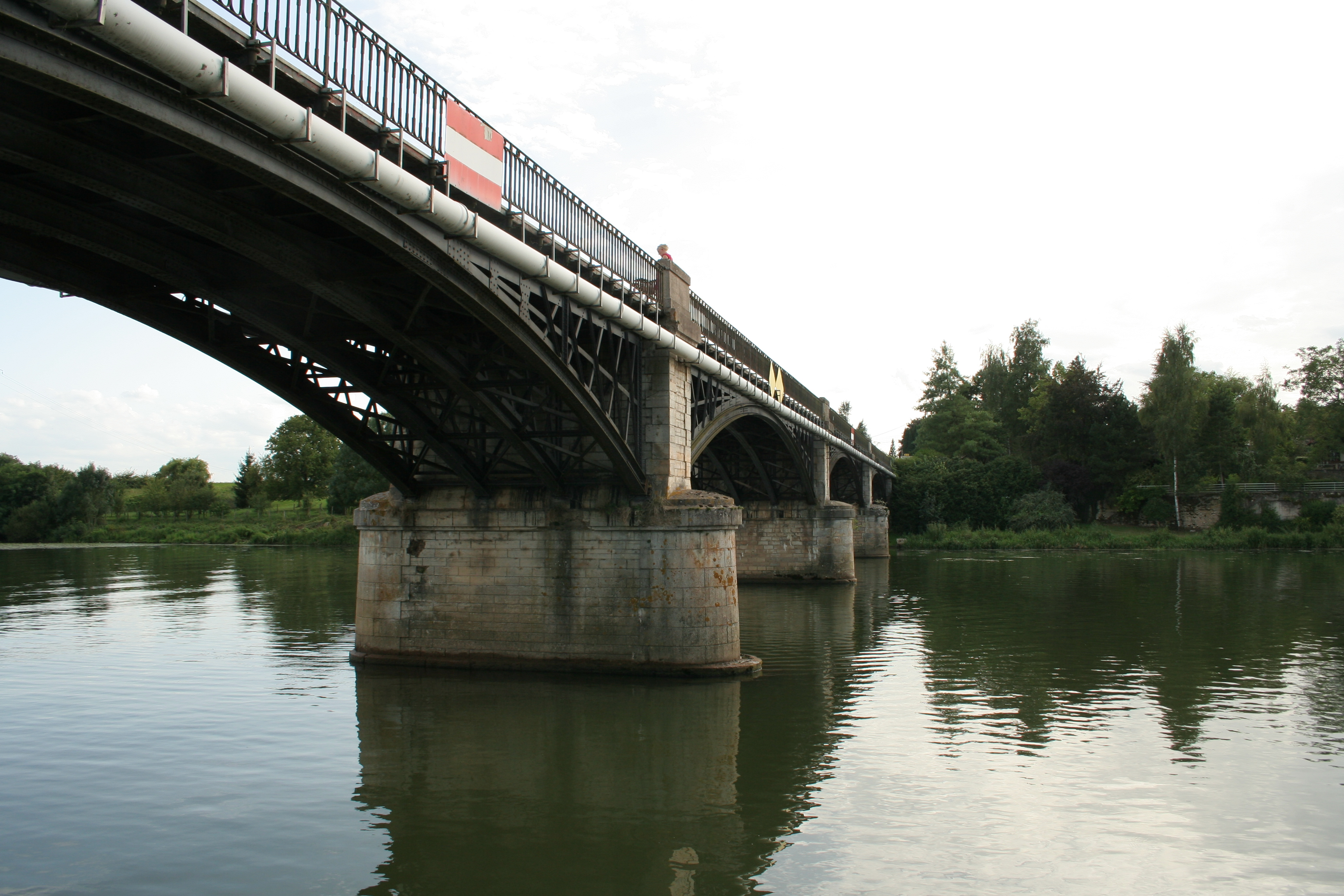
- The Prantigny Bridge
- Location of Montureux-et-Prantigny
- Location within France Location within Bourgogne-Franche-Comté
- Coordinates: 47°30′14″N 5°38′20″E
- Country: France
- Region: Bourgogne-Franche-Comté
- Department: Haute-Saône
- Arrondissement: Vesoul
- Canton: Dampierre-sur-Salon

Government
  - Mayor (2020–2026): Catherine Jacquemard
- Area^{1}: 12.18 km^{2} (4.70 sq mi)
- Highest elevation: 246 m (807 ft)
- Lowest elevation: 190 m (620 ft)
- Population (2023): 189
  - Density: 15.5/km^{2} (40.2/sq mi)
- Time zone: UTC+01:00 (CET)
  - Summer (DST): UTC+02:00 (CEST)
- INSEE/Postal code: 70371 /70100
- ^{1} French Land Register data, which excludes lakes, ponds, glaciers > 1 km^{2} (0.386 sq mi or 247 acres) and river estuaries.

Montureux-et-Prantigny (French pronunciation: [mɔ̃tyʁø e pʁɑ̃tiɲi]) is a commune in the Haute-Saône department in the region of Bourgogne-Franche-Comté in eastern France.

== See also ==
- Communes of the Haute-Saône department
