= Vereux =

- Commune
- Location of Vereux
- Location within France Location within Bourgogne-Franche-Comté
- Coordinates: 47°31′19″N 5°39′07″E
- Country: France
- Region: Bourgogne-Franche-Comté
- Department: Haute-Saône
- Arrondissement: Vesoul
- Canton: Dampierre-sur-Salon

Government
  - Mayor (2024–2026): Frédéric Mignerey
- Area^{1}: 9.02 km^{2} (3.48 sq mi)
- Highest elevation: 253 m (830 ft)
- Lowest elevation: 191 m (627 ft)
- Population (2023): 208
  - Density: 23.1/km^{2} (59.7/sq mi)
- Time zone: UTC+01:00 (CET)
  - Summer (DST): UTC+02:00 (CEST)
- INSEE/Postal code: 70546 /70180
- ^{1} French Land Register data, which excludes lakes, ponds, glaciers > 1 km^{2} (0.386 sq mi or 247 acres) and river estuaries.

Vereux is a commune in the Haute-Saône department in the region of Bourgogne-Franche-Comté in eastern France.

== See also ==
- Communes of the Haute-Saône department
