= Ray-sur-Saône =

- Commune
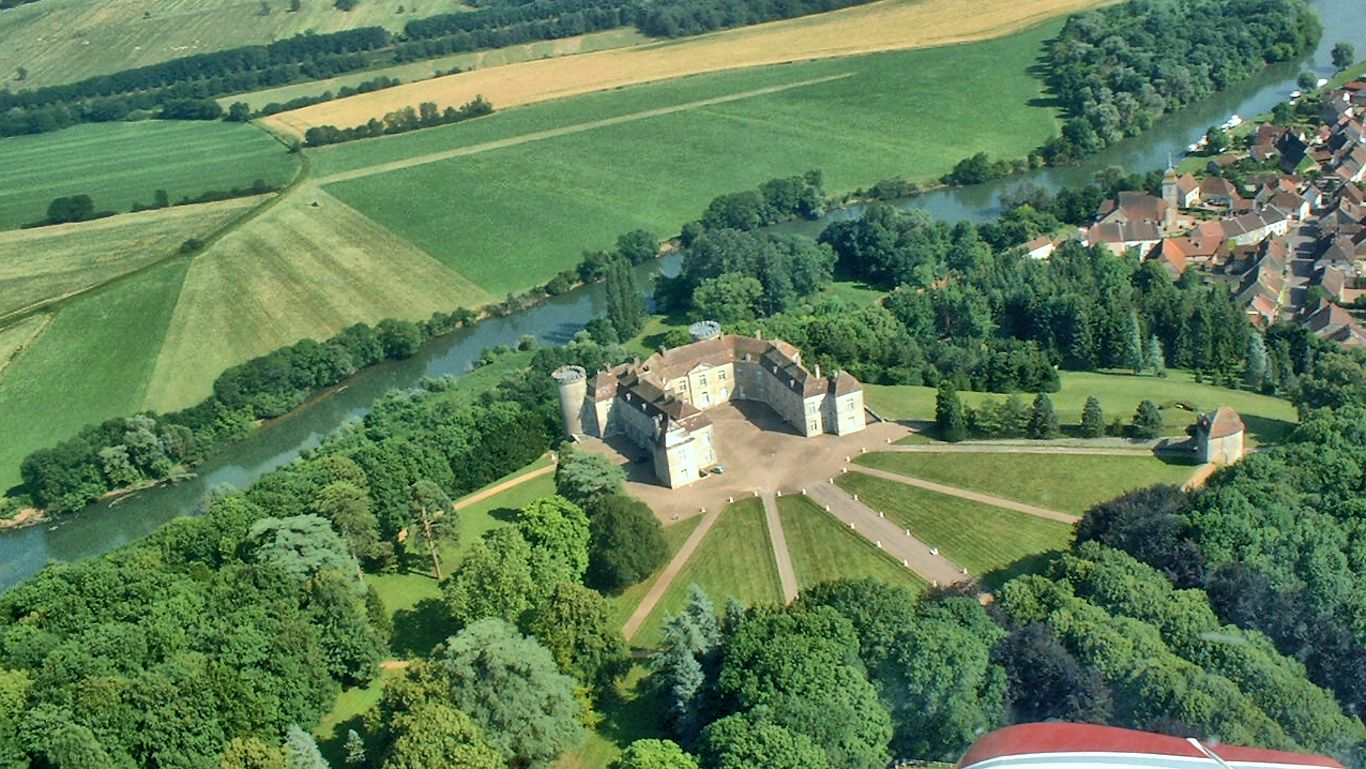
- An aerial view of the chateau in Ray-sur-Saône

- Coat of arms
- Location of Ray-sur-Saône
- Location within France Location within Bourgogne-Franche-Comté
- Coordinates: 47°35′13″N 5°49′41″E
- Country: France
- Region: Bourgogne-Franche-Comté
- Department: Haute-Saône
- Arrondissement: Vesoul
- Canton: Dampierre-sur-Salon

Government
  - Mayor (2020–2026): Michel Albin
- Area^{1}: 7.88 km^{2} (3.04 sq mi)
- Highest elevation: 263 m (863 ft)
- Lowest elevation: 197 m (646 ft)
- Population (2023): 209
  - Density: 26.5/km^{2} (68.7/sq mi)
- Time zone: UTC+01:00 (CET)
  - Summer (DST): UTC+02:00 (CEST)
- INSEE/Postal code: 70438 /70130
- ^{1} French Land Register data, which excludes lakes, ponds, glaciers > 1 km^{2} (0.386 sq mi or 247 acres) and river estuaries.

Ray-sur-Saône (French pronunciation: [ʁɛ syʁ son], literally Ray on Saône) is a commune in the Haute-Saône department in the region of Bourgogne-Franche-Comté in eastern France.

== See also ==
- Communes of the Haute-Saône department
