= Argillières =

- Commune
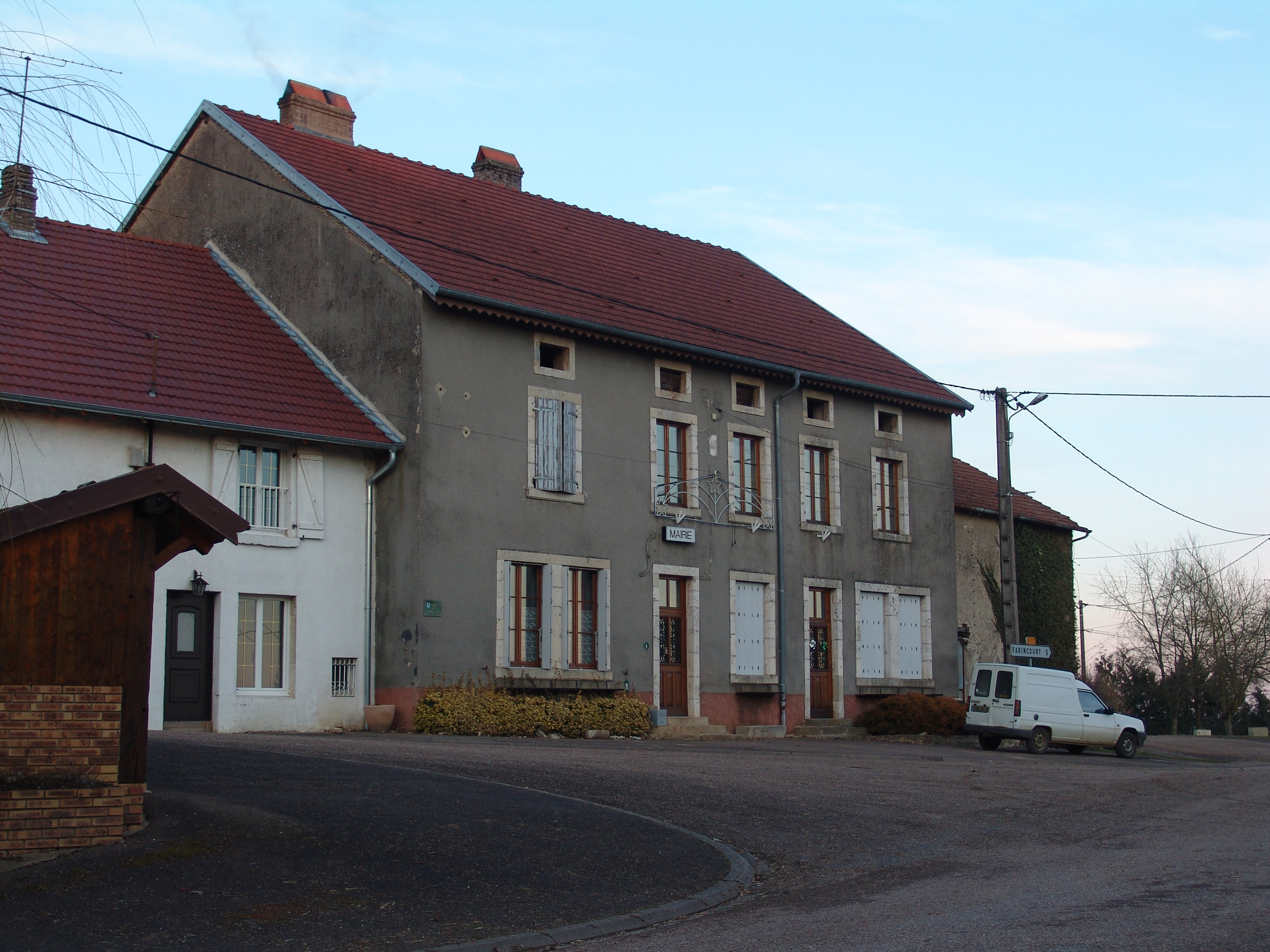
- The town hall in Argillières

- Coat of arms
- Location of Argillières
- Location within France Location within Bourgogne-Franche-Comté
- Coordinates: 47°40′02″N 5°38′12″E
- Country: France
- Region: Bourgogne-Franche-Comté
- Department: Haute-Saône
- Arrondissement: Vesoul
- Canton: Dampierre-sur-Salon
- Intercommunality: CC Quatre Rivières

Government
  - Mayor (2020–2026): Bernard Thierry
- Area^{1}: 9.58 km^{2} (3.70 sq mi)
- Highest elevation: 366 m (1,201 ft)
- Lowest elevation: 230 m (750 ft)
- Population (2023): 72
  - Density: 7.5/km^{2} (19/sq mi)
- Time zone: UTC+01:00 (CET)
  - Summer (DST): UTC+02:00 (CEST)
- INSEE/Postal code: 70027 /70600
- ^{1} French Land Register data, which excludes lakes, ponds, glaciers > 1 km^{2} (0.386 sq mi or 247 acres) and river estuaries.

Argillières is a commune in the Haute-Saône department in the region of Bourgogne-Franche-Comté in eastern France.

== See also ==
- Communes of the Haute-Saône department
