= Bouhans-et-Feurg =

- Commune
- Coat of arms
- Location of Bouhans-et-Feurg
- Location within France Location within Bourgogne-Franche-Comté
- Coordinates: 47°28′45″N 5°30′28″E
- Country: France
- Region: Bourgogne-Franche-Comté
- Department: Haute-Saône
- Arrondissement: Vesoul
- Canton: Dampierre-sur-Salon
- Area^{1}: 9.75 km^{2} (3.76 sq mi)
- Highest elevation: 247 m (810 ft)
- Lowest elevation: 197 m (646 ft)
- Population (2023): 242
  - Density: 24.8/km^{2} (64.3/sq mi)
- Time zone: UTC+01:00 (CET)
  - Summer (DST): UTC+02:00 (CEST)
- INSEE/Postal code: 70080 /70100
- ^{1} French Land Register data, which excludes lakes, ponds, glaciers > 1 km^{2} (0.386 sq mi or 247 acres) and river estuaries.

Bouhans-et-Feurg is a commune in the Haute-Saône department in the region of Bourgogne-Franche-Comté in eastern France.

== See also ==
- Communes of the Haute-Saône department
