= Vars, Haute-Saône =

Vars
- Commune
- Location of Vars
- Location within France Location within Bourgogne-Franche-Comté
- Coordinates: 47°32′05″N 5°32′02″E
- Country: France
- Region: Bourgogne-Franche-Comté
- Department: Haute-Saône
- Arrondissement: Vesoul
- Canton: Dampierre-sur-Salon

Government
  - Mayor (2020–2026): Jean-Pierre Sornay
- Area^{1}: 16.16 km^{2} (6.24 sq mi)
- Highest elevation: 299 m (981 ft)
- Lowest elevation: 207 m (679 ft)
- Population (2023): 176
  - Density: 10.9/km^{2} (28.2/sq mi)
- Time zone: UTC+01:00 (CET)
  - Summer (DST): UTC+02:00 (CEST)
- INSEE/Postal code: 70523 /70600
- ^{1} French Land Register data, which excludes lakes, ponds, glaciers > 1 km^{2} (0.386 sq mi or 247 acres) and river estuaries.

Vars is a commune in the Haute-Saône département in the region of Bourgogne-Franche-Comté in eastern France.

== See also ==
- Communes of the Haute-Saône department
