= Canton of Dampierre-sur-Salon =

Coordinates: 47.56°N 5.68°E

Dampierre-sur-Salon
- Canton
- Interactive map of Dampierre-sur-Salon
- Country: France
- Region: Bourgogne-Franche-Comté
- Department: Haute-Saône
- No. of communes: {{{nbcomm}}}

Government
  - Representatives (2021–2028): Dimitri Doussot; Martine Gautheron
- Area: 632.54 km^{2} (244.23 sq mi)
- Population (2023): 10,678
  - Density: 16.881/km^{2} (43.722/sq mi)
- INSEE code: 70 01

The canton of Dampierre-sur-Salon is an administrative division of the Haute-Saône department, northeastern France. Its borders were modified at the French canton reorganisation which came into effect in March 2015. Its seat is in Dampierre-sur-Salon.

== Composition ==
It consists of the following communes:

1. Achey
2. Argillières
3. Attricourt
4. Autet
5. Autrey-lès-Gray
6. Auvet-et-la-Chapelotte
7. Bouhans-et-Feurg
8. Brotte-lès-Ray
9. Broye-les-Loups-et-Verfontaine
10. Champlitte
11. Chargey-lès-Gray
12. Courtesoult-et-Gatey
13. Dampierre-sur-Salon
14. Delain
15. Denèvre
16. Écuelle
17. Fahy-lès-Autrey
18. Fédry
19. Ferrières-lès-Ray
20. Fleurey-lès-Lavoncourt
21. Fouvent-Saint-Andoche
22. Framont
23. Francourt
24. Grandecourt
25. Larret
26. Lavoncourt
27. Lœuilley
28. Membrey
29. Mont-Saint-Léger
30. Montot
31. Montureux-et-Prantigny
32. Oyrières
33. Percey-le-Grand
34. Pierrecourt
35. Poyans
36. Ray-sur-Saône
37. Recologne
38. Renaucourt
39. Rigny
40. Roche-et-Raucourt
41. Savoyeux
42. Theuley
43. Tincey-et-Pontrebeau
44. Vaite
45. Vanne
46. Vars
47. Vauconcourt-Nervezain
48. Vereux
49. Villers-Vaudey
50. Volon

== Councillors ==
Election	Councillors	Party	Occupation
2015	Alain Blinette	LR	Mayor of Rigny
2015	Fabienne Richardot	LR	Mayor of Ferrières-lès-Ray

== Pictures of the canton ==
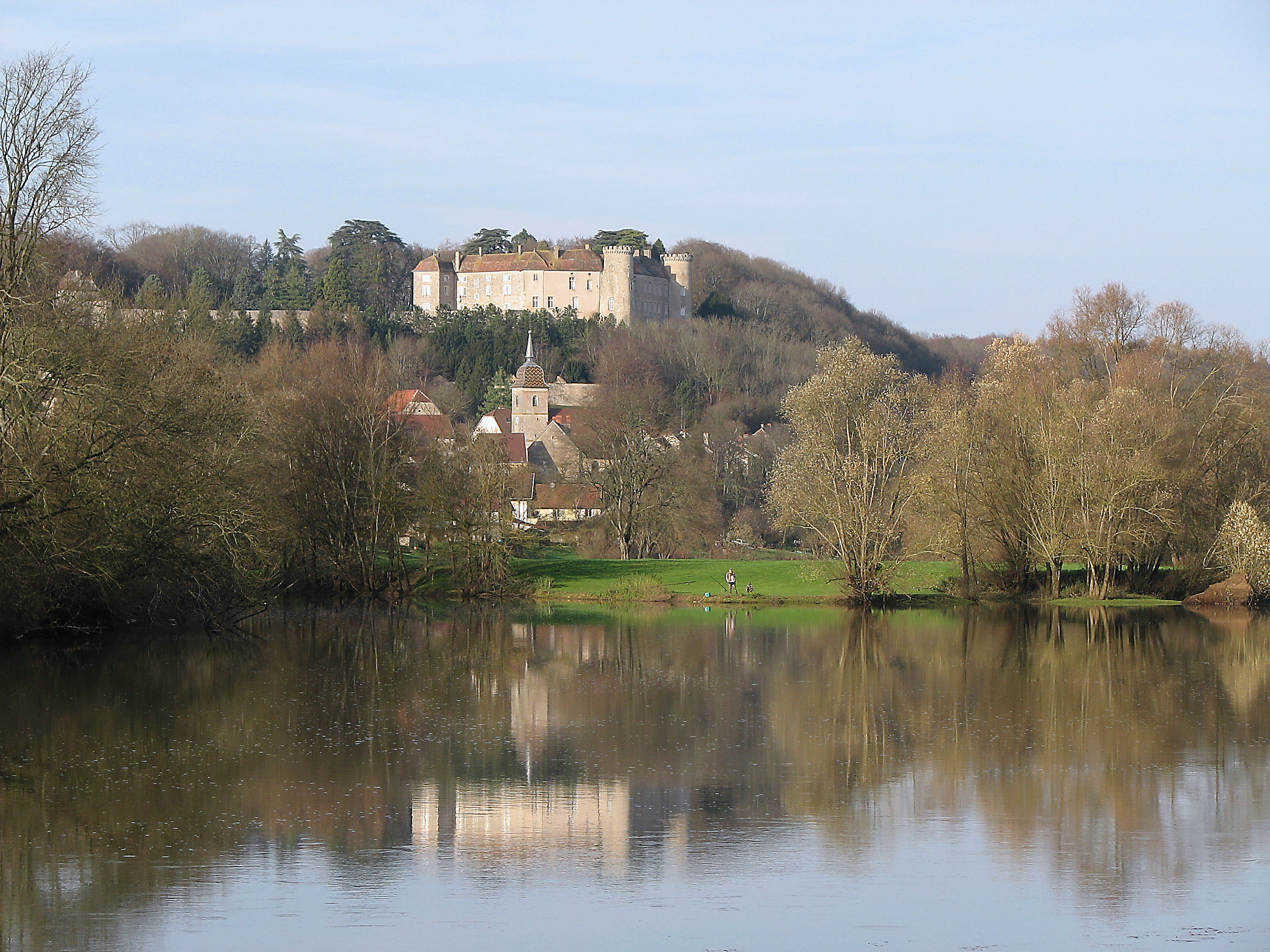
View of Ray-sur-Saône

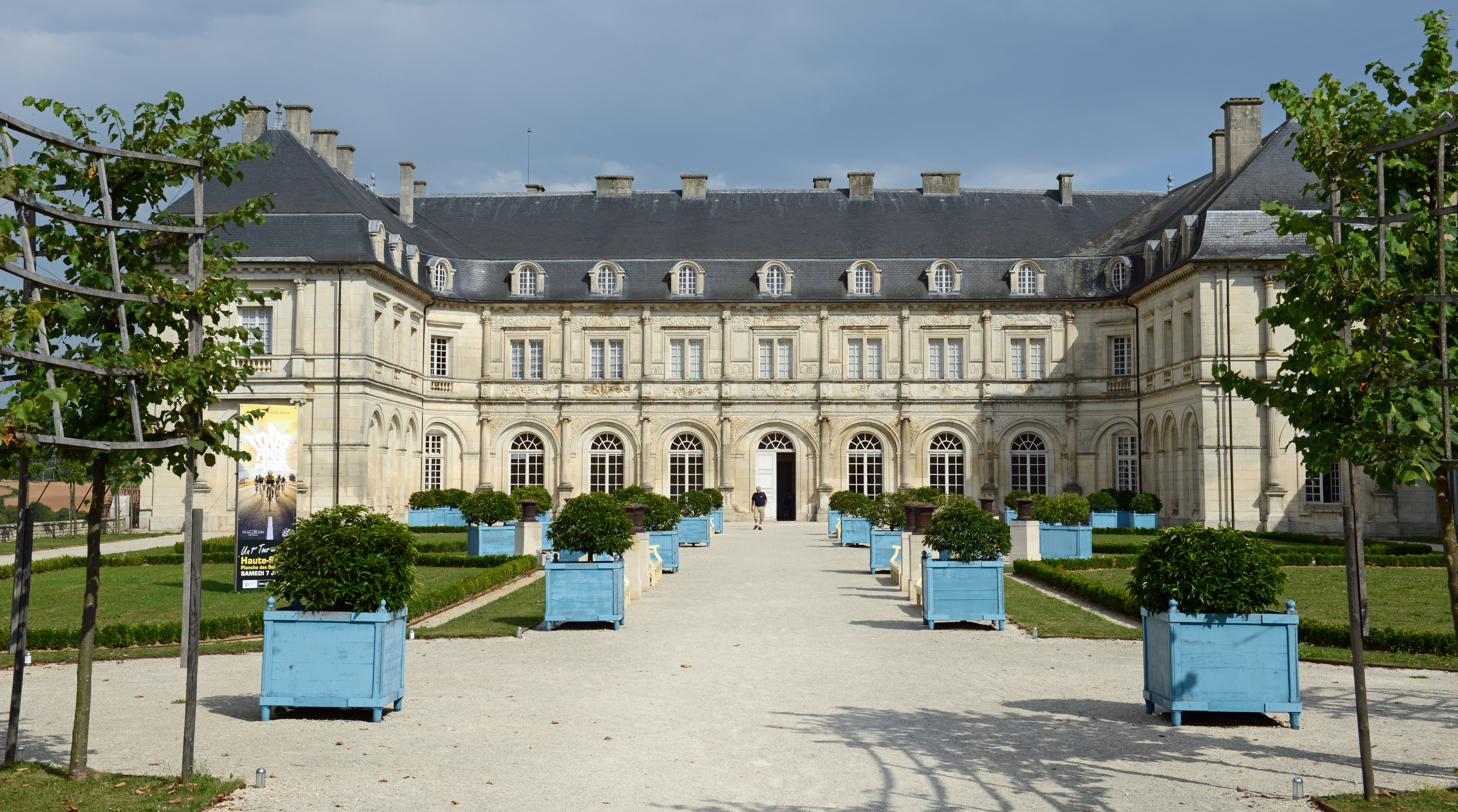
Champlitte Castle

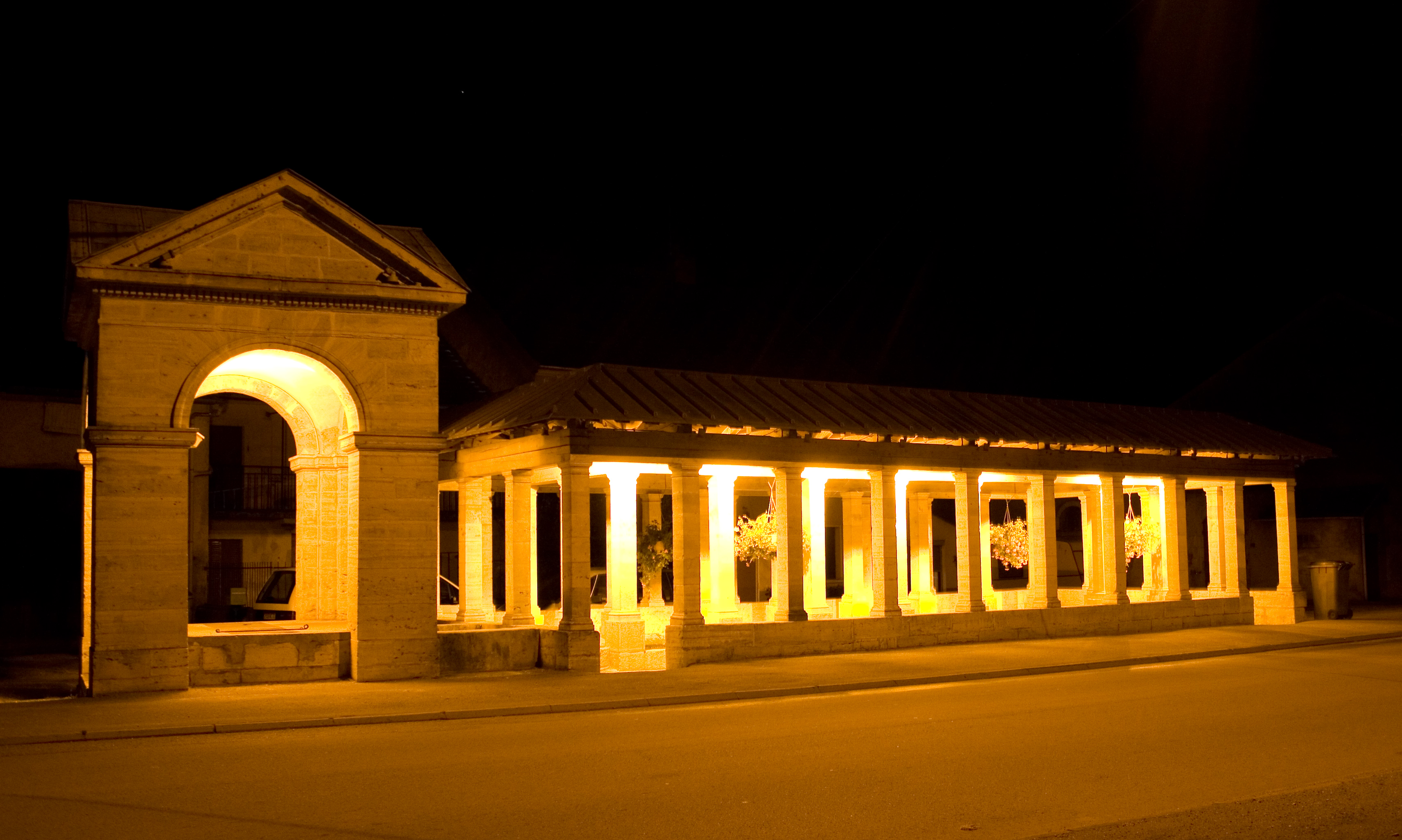
Washhouse in Oyrières
