= Recologne, Haute-Saône =

Recologne
- Commune
- Location of Recologne
- Location within France Location within Bourgogne-Franche-Comté
- Coordinates: 47°34′59″N 5°46′38″E
- Country: France
- Region: Bourgogne-Franche-Comté
- Department: Haute-Saône
- Arrondissement: Vesoul
- Canton: Dampierre-sur-Salon

Government
  - Mayor (2020–2026): Marie-Claire Gaxatte
- Area^{1}: 1.15 km^{2} (0.44 sq mi)
- Highest elevation: 226 m (741 ft)
- Lowest elevation: 197 m (646 ft)
- Population (2023): 30
  - Density: 26/km^{2} (68/sq mi)
- Time zone: UTC+01:00 (CET)
  - Summer (DST): UTC+02:00 (CEST)
- INSEE/Postal code: 70440 /70130
- ^{1} French Land Register data, which excludes lakes, ponds, glaciers > 1 km^{2} (0.386 sq mi or 247 acres) and river estuaries.

Recologne (French pronunciation: [ʁəkɔlɔɲ]) is a commune in the Haute-Saône department in the region of Bourgogne-Franche-Comté in eastern France.

== See also ==
- Communes of the Haute-Saône department
