= Grandecourt =

- Commune
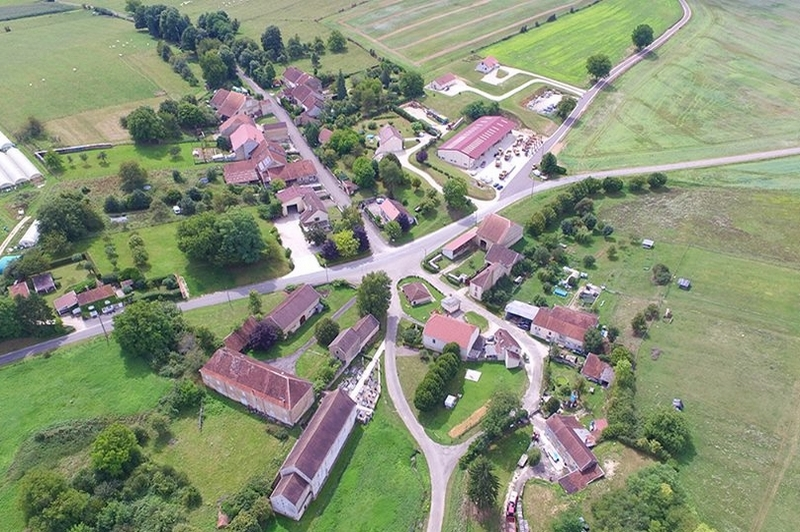
- A general view of Grandecourt
- Location of Grandecourt
- Location within France Location within Bourgogne-Franche-Comté
- Coordinates: 47°38′04″N 5°51′29″E
- Country: France
- Region: Bourgogne-Franche-Comté
- Department: Haute-Saône
- Arrondissement: Vesoul
- Canton: Dampierre-sur-Salon

Government
  - Mayor (2020–2026): Patrick Poissenot
- Area^{1}: 3.39 km^{2} (1.31 sq mi)
- Highest elevation: 253 m (830 ft)
- Lowest elevation: 211 m (692 ft)
- Population (2023): 47
  - Density: 14/km^{2} (36/sq mi)
- Time zone: UTC+01:00 (CET)
  - Summer (DST): UTC+02:00 (CEST)
- INSEE/Postal code: 70274 /70120
- ^{1} French Land Register data, which excludes lakes, ponds, glaciers > 1 km^{2} (0.386 sq mi or 247 acres) and river estuaries.

Grandecourt (French pronunciation: [ɡʁɑ̃dkuʁ]) is a commune in the Haute-Saône department in the region of Bourgogne-Franche-Comté in eastern France.

== See also ==
- Communes of the Haute-Saône department
