= Savoyeux =

- Commune
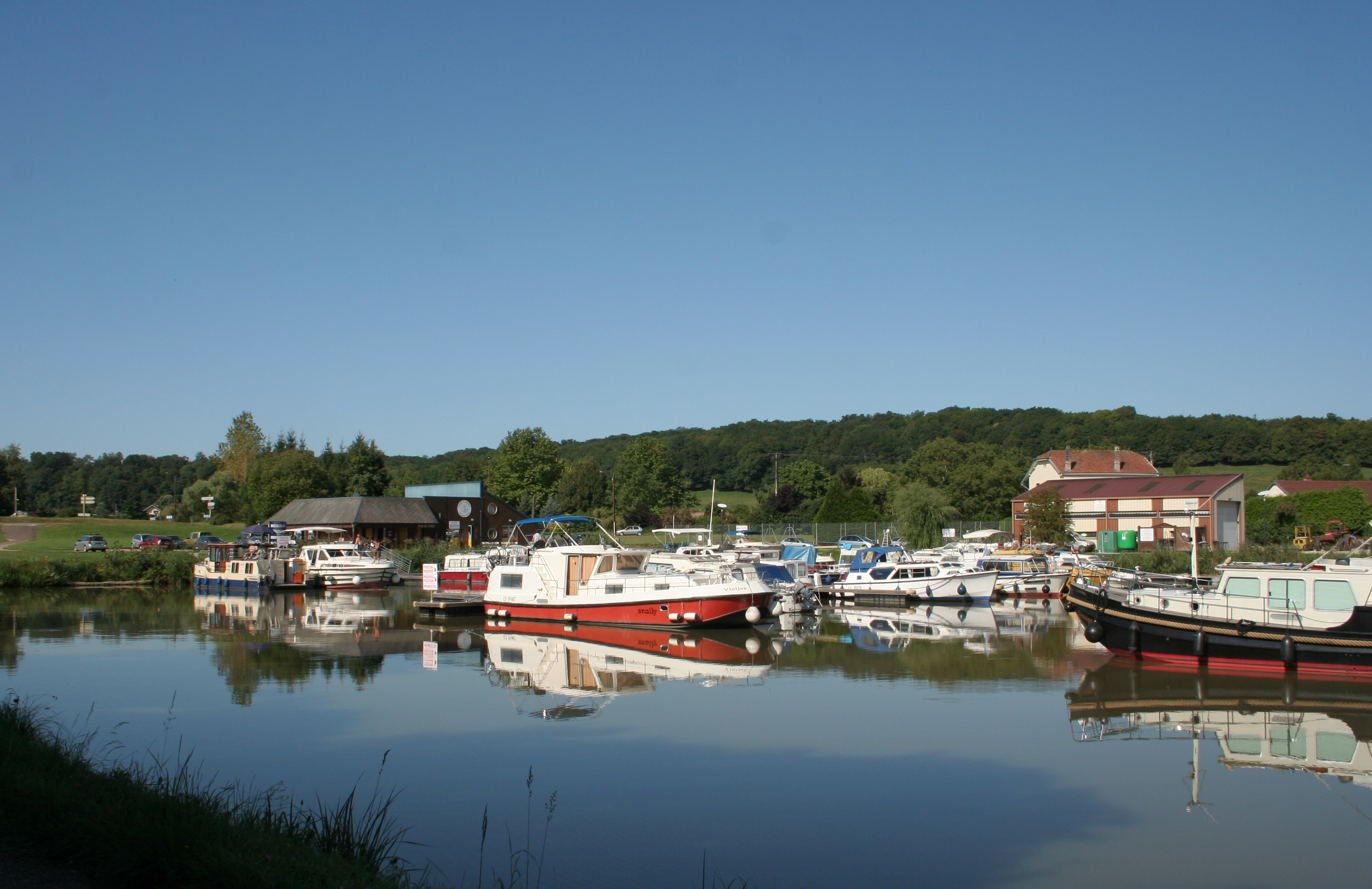
- The port in Savoyeux

- Coat of arms
- Location of Savoyeux
- Location within France Location within Bourgogne-Franche-Comté
- Coordinates: 47°32′53″N 5°44′54″E
- Country: France
- Region: Bourgogne-Franche-Comté
- Department: Haute-Saône
- Arrondissement: Vesoul
- Canton: Dampierre-sur-Salon
- Area^{1}: 6.14 km^{2} (2.37 sq mi)
- Highest elevation: 244 m (801 ft)
- Lowest elevation: 192 m (630 ft)
- Population (2023): 200
  - Density: 33/km^{2} (84/sq mi)
- Time zone: UTC+01:00 (CET)
  - Summer (DST): UTC+02:00 (CEST)
- INSEE/Postal code: 70481 /70130
- ^{1} French Land Register data, which excludes lakes, ponds, glaciers > 1 km^{2} (0.386 sq mi or 247 acres) and river estuaries.

Savoyeux is a commune in the Haute-Saône department in the region of Bourgogne-Franche-Comté in eastern France.

== See also ==
- Communes of the Haute-Saône department
