= Lœuilley =

- Commune
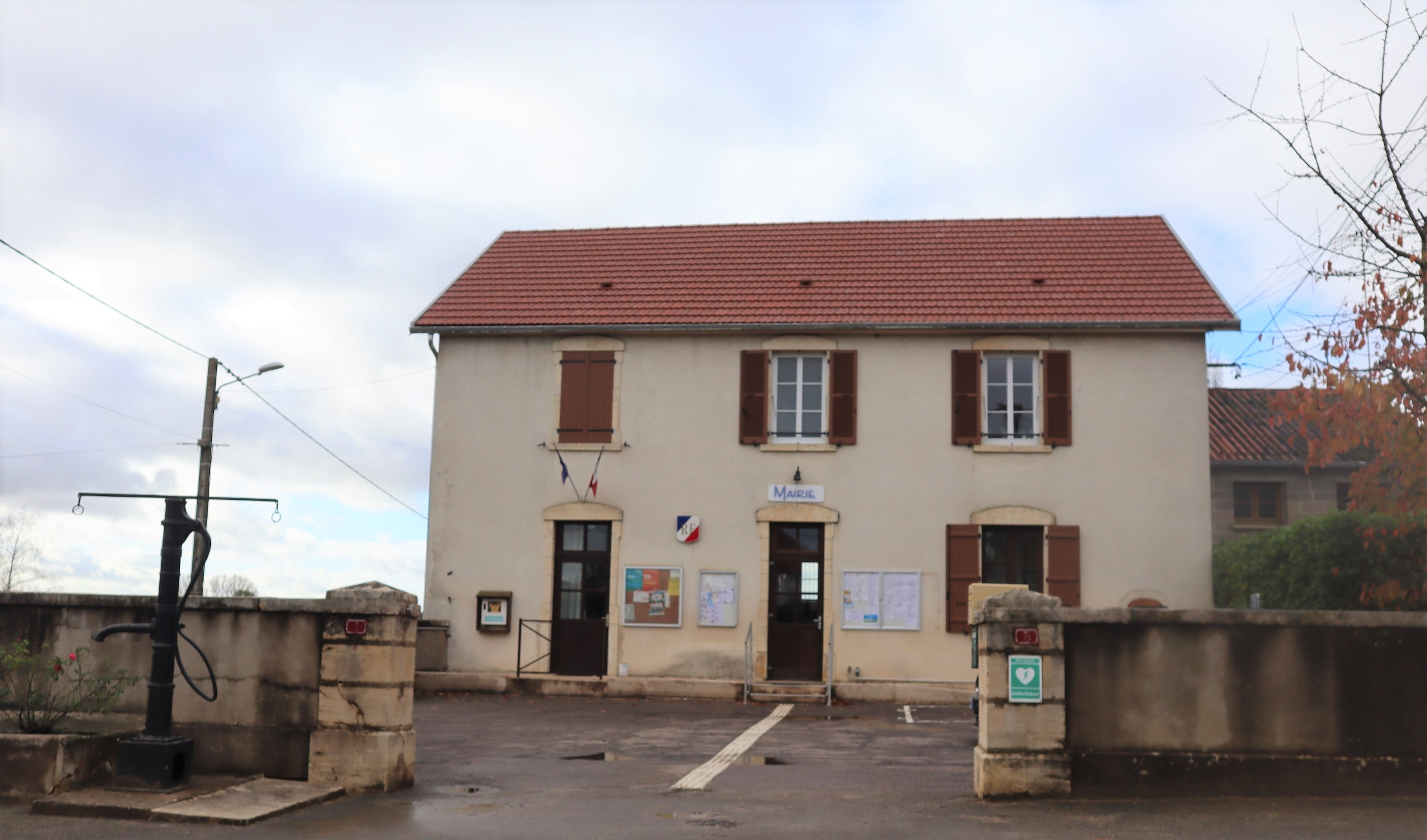
- Lœuilley Town hall
- Location of Lœuilley
- Location within France Location within Bourgogne-Franche-Comté
- Coordinates: 47°27′46″N 5°23′28″E
- Country: France
- Region: Bourgogne-Franche-Comté
- Department: Haute-Saône
- Arrondissement: Vesoul
- Canton: Dampierre-sur-Salon

Government
  - Mayor (2020–2026): Jean-Christophe Vagner
- Area^{1}: 5.67 km^{2} (2.19 sq mi)
- Highest elevation: 248 m (814 ft)
- Lowest elevation: 206 m (676 ft)
- Population (2023): 93
  - Density: 16/km^{2} (42/sq mi)
- Time zone: UTC+01:00 (CET)
  - Summer (DST): UTC+02:00 (CEST)
- INSEE/Postal code: 70305 /70100
- ^{1} French Land Register data, which excludes lakes, ponds, glaciers > 1 km^{2} (0.386 sq mi or 247 acres) and river estuaries.

Lœuilley (French pronunciation: [lœjɛ]) is a commune in the Haute-Saône department in the region of Bourgogne-Franche-Comté in eastern France.

== See also ==
- Communes of the Haute-Saône department
