= Renaucourt =

- Commune
- Coat of arms
- Location of Renaucourt
- Location within France Location within Bourgogne-Franche-Comté
- Coordinates: 47°38′19″N 5°46′30″E
- Country: France
- Region: Bourgogne-Franche-Comté
- Department: Haute-Saône
- Arrondissement: Vesoul
- Canton: Dampierre-sur-Salon
- Area^{1}: 6.14 km^{2} (2.37 sq mi)
- Highest elevation: 260 m (850 ft)
- Lowest elevation: 207 m (679 ft)
- Population (2023): 116
  - Density: 18.9/km^{2} (48.9/sq mi)
- Time zone: UTC+01:00 (CET)
  - Summer (DST): UTC+02:00 (CEST)
- INSEE/Postal code: 70442 /70120
- ^{1} French Land Register data, which excludes lakes, ponds, glaciers > 1 km^{2} (0.386 sq mi or 247 acres) and river estuaries.

Renaucourt is a commune in the Haute-Saône department in the region of Bourgogne-Franche-Comté in eastern France.

== See also ==
- Communes of the Haute-Saône department
