= Chargey-lès-Gray =

- Commune
- Coat of arms
- Location of Chargey-lès-Gray
- Location within France Location within Bourgogne-Franche-Comté
- Coordinates: 47°29′18″N 5°34′33″E
- Country: France
- Region: Bourgogne-Franche-Comté
- Department: Haute-Saône
- Arrondissement: Vesoul
- Canton: Dampierre-sur-Salon

Government
  - Mayor (2020–2026): Chantal Guinet
- Area^{1}: 16.56 km^{2} (6.39 sq mi)
- Highest elevation: 250 m (820 ft)
- Lowest elevation: 192 m (630 ft)
- Population (2023): 667
  - Density: 40.3/km^{2} (104/sq mi)
- Time zone: UTC+01:00 (CET)
  - Summer (DST): UTC+02:00 (CEST)
- INSEE/Postal code: 70132 /70100
- ^{1} French Land Register data, which excludes lakes, ponds, glaciers > 1 km^{2} (0.386 sq mi or 247 acres) and river estuaries.

Chargey-lès-Gray (French pronunciation: [ʃaʁʒɛ lɛ ɡʁe], literally Chargey near Gray) is a commune in the Haute-Saône department in the region of Bourgogne-Franche-Comté in eastern France.

== Climate ==
Climate data for Chargey-les-Gray (1997–2020 averages)
Month	Jan	Feb	Mar	Apr	May	Jun	Jul	Aug	Sep	Oct	Nov	Dec	Year
Record high °C (°F)	16.6 (61.9)	21.1 (70.0)	24.1 (75.4)	27.7 (81.9)	31.7 (89.1)	36.8 (98.2)	39.3 (102.7)	39.3 (102.7)	33.9 (93.0)	27.6 (81.7)	21.9 (71.4)	16.6 (61.9)	39.3 (102.7)
Mean daily maximum °C (°F)	5.5 (41.9)	7.4 (45.3)	12.1 (53.8)	16.4 (61.5)	20.2 (68.4)	24.5 (76.1)	26.4 (79.5)	25.9 (78.6)	21.7 (71.1)	16.1 (61.0)	9.7 (49.5)	6.0 (42.8)	16.0 (60.8)
Daily mean °C (°F)	2.9 (37.2)	3.9 (39.0)	7.5 (45.5)	11.0 (51.8)	14.7 (58.5)	18.5 (65.3)	20.3 (68.5)	20.0 (68.0)	16.3 (61.3)	12.0 (53.6)	6.7 (44.1)	3.6 (38.5)	11.5 (52.7)
Mean daily minimum °C (°F)	0.4 (32.7)	0.5 (32.9)	2.9 (37.2)	5.5 (41.9)	9.2 (48.6)	12.5 (54.5)	14.2 (57.6)	14.1 (57.4)	10.9 (51.6)	7.9 (46.2)	3.6 (38.5)	1.1 (34.0)	6.9 (44.4)
Record low °C (°F)	−12.5 (9.5)	−12.7 (9.1)	−11.2 (11.8)	−4.5 (23.9)	−0.1 (31.8)	2.5 (36.5)	6.7 (44.1)	5.6 (42.1)	2.6 (36.7)	−4.6 (23.7)	−9.4 (15.1)	−18.2 (−0.8)	−18.2 (−0.8)
Average precipitation mm (inches)	61.1 (2.41)	50.3 (1.98)	60.0 (2.36)	64.3 (2.53)	81.5 (3.21)	70.8 (2.79)	76.9 (3.03)	76.9 (3.03)	62.0 (2.44)	82.0 (3.23)	80.1 (3.15)	68.4 (2.69)	834.3 (32.85)
Average precipitation days (≥ 1.0 mm)	11.4	9.3	10.8	9.5	11.2	9.6	10.2	9.7	8.4	10.7	11.6	12.5	124.8
Mean monthly sunshine hours	69.9	99.1	164.5	198.0	221.7	255.2	254.2	228.6	189.4	123.7	72.1	57.6	1,934
Source: Meteociel

== See also ==
- Communes of the Haute-Saône department
