= Écuelle =

- Commune
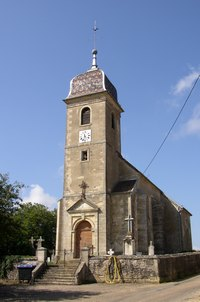
- The church in Écuelle
- Location of Écuelle
- Location within France Location within Bourgogne-Franche-Comté
- Coordinates: 47°33′02″N 5°33′05″E
- Country: France
- Region: Bourgogne-Franche-Comté
- Department: Haute-Saône
- Arrondissement: Vesoul
- Canton: Dampierre-sur-Salon

Government
  - Mayor (2020–2026): Stéphane Catalot
- Area^{1}: 5.56 km^{2} (2.15 sq mi)
- Highest elevation: 260 m (850 ft)
- Lowest elevation: 212 m (696 ft)
- Population (2023): 72
  - Density: 13/km^{2} (34/sq mi)
- Time zone: UTC+01:00 (CET)
  - Summer (DST): UTC+02:00 (CEST)
- INSEE/Postal code: 70211 /70600
- ^{1} French Land Register data, which excludes lakes, ponds, glaciers > 1 km^{2} (0.386 sq mi or 247 acres) and river estuaries.

Écuelle (French pronunciation: [ekɥɛl]) is a commune in the Haute-Saône department in the region of Bourgogne-Franche-Comté in eastern France.

== See also ==
- Communes of the Haute-Saône department
