= Autrey-lès-Gray =

- Commune
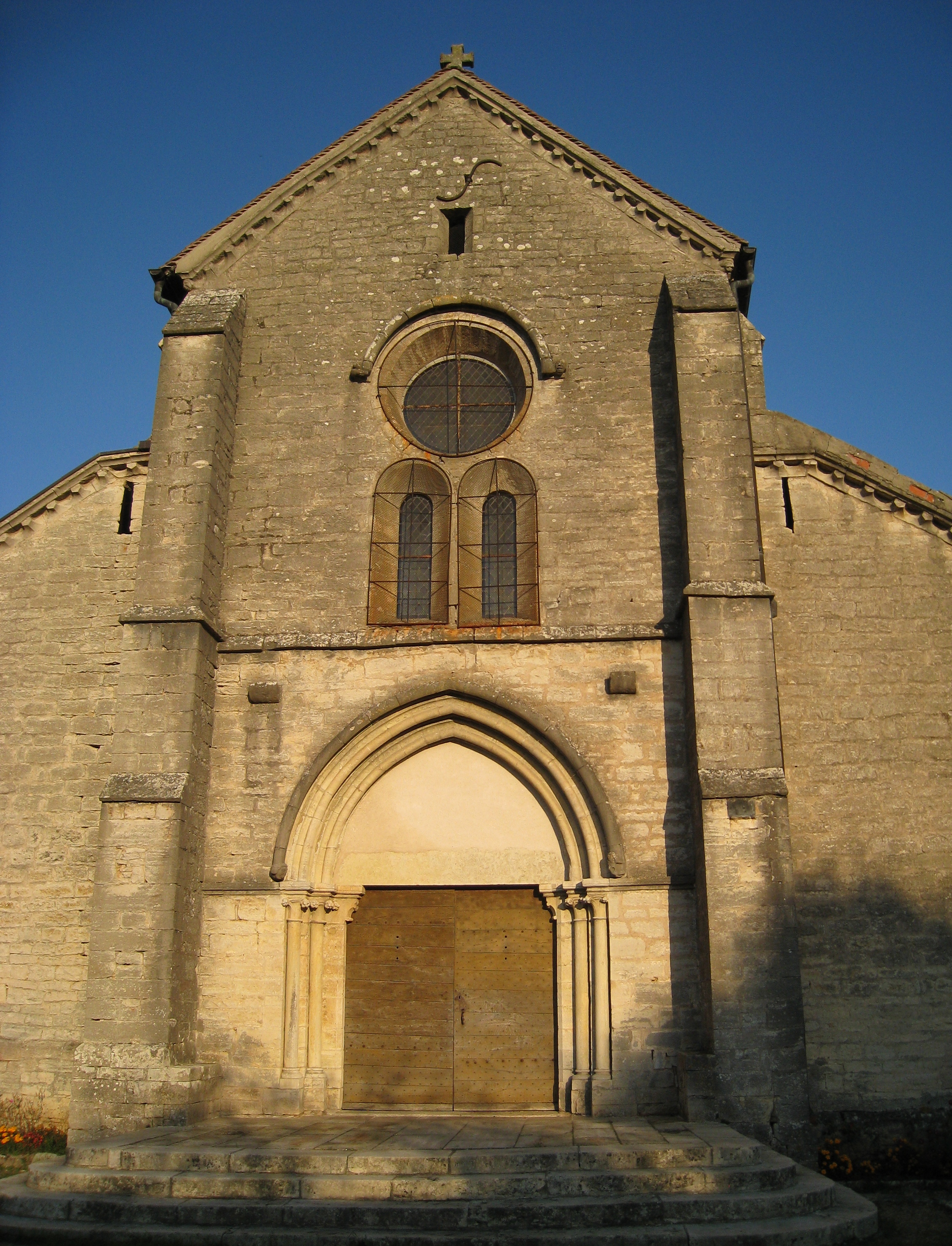
- The church in Autrey-lès-Gray

- Coat of arms
- Location of Autrey-lès-Gray
- Location within France Location within Bourgogne-Franche-Comté
- Coordinates: 47°29′14″N 5°29′30″E
- Country: France
- Region: Bourgogne-Franche-Comté
- Department: Haute-Saône
- Arrondissement: Vesoul
- Canton: Dampierre-sur-Salon
- Intercommunality: CC Val de Gray

Government
  - Mayor (2020–2026): Jérôme Saccomani
- Area^{1}: 32.40 km^{2} (12.51 sq mi)
- Highest elevation: 254 m (833 ft)
- Lowest elevation: 192 m (630 ft)
- Population (2023): 398
  - Density: 12.3/km^{2} (31.8/sq mi)
- Time zone: UTC+01:00 (CET)
  - Summer (DST): UTC+02:00 (CEST)
- INSEE/Postal code: 70041 /70100
- ^{1} French Land Register data, which excludes lakes, ponds, glaciers > 1 km^{2} (0.386 sq mi or 247 acres) and river estuaries.

Autrey-lès-Gray (French pronunciation: [otʁɛ lɛ ɡʁe], literally Autrey near Gray) is a commune in the Haute-Saône department in the region of Bourgogne-Franche-Comté in eastern France.

== See also ==
- Communes of the Haute-Saône department
