= Fahy, County Mayo =

Village in County Mayo, Ireland

Fahy An Fhaiche
- Village
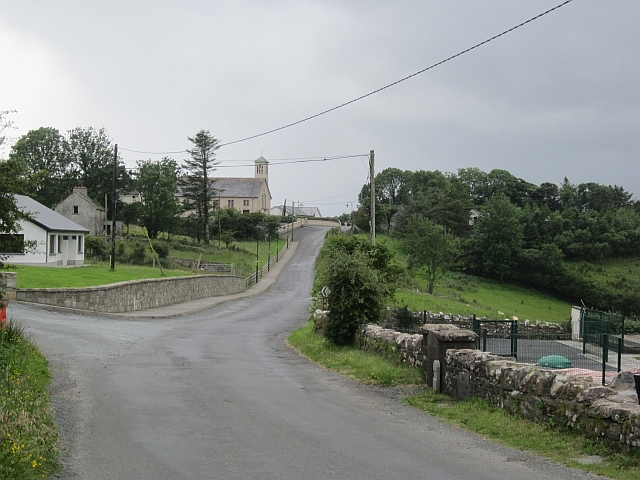
- Church and Montessori school entrance at Fahy

- Location in Ireland
- Coordinates: 53.849°N 9.491°W
- Country: Ireland
- Province: Connacht
- County: County Mayo

Fahy (Irish: an Fhaiche, meaning 'a green field') is a small village in County Mayo, Ireland. It is approximately 7 kilometres (4.3 mi) north of Westport and has a national (primary) school and Montessori school. The local Catholic church is, together with Kilmeena, in the ecclesiastical parish of Kilmeena-Fahy. Fahy Rovers, a local soccer club, also has facilities in the area.

The surrounding townlands of Fahy More (Irish: An Fhaiche Mhór) and Lugnafahy (Irish: Log na Faiche) are in the civil parish of Kilmaclasser.

== See also ==
- List of townlands of County Mayo
