= Lavoncourt =

- Commune
- Coat of arms
- Location of Lavoncourt
- Location within France Location within Bourgogne-Franche-Comté
- Coordinates: 47°37′33″N 5°47′09″E
- Country: France
- Region: Bourgogne-Franche-Comté
- Department: Haute-Saône
- Arrondissement: Vesoul
- Canton: Dampierre-sur-Salon

Government
  - Mayor (2020–2026): Jean-Paul Carteret
- Area^{1}: 5.55 km^{2} (2.14 sq mi)
- Highest elevation: 254 m (833 ft)
- Lowest elevation: 202 m (663 ft)
- Population (2023): 331
  - Density: 59.6/km^{2} (154/sq mi)
- Time zone: UTC+01:00 (CET)
  - Summer (DST): UTC+02:00 (CEST)
- INSEE/Postal code: 70299 /70120
- ^{1} French Land Register data, which excludes lakes, ponds, glaciers > 1 km^{2} (0.386 sq mi or 247 acres) and river estuaries.

Lavoncourt (French pronunciation: [lavɔ̃kuʁ]) is a commune in the Haute-Saône department in the region of Bourgogne-Franche-Comté in eastern France.

== Urban planning ==
=== Typology ===
At January 1, 2024, Lavoncourt is categorized as a rural commune with dispersed housing, according to the new seven-level communal density grid defined by INSEE in 2022.

== See also ==
- Communes of the Haute-Saône department
