= Auvet-et-la-Chapelotte =

- Commune
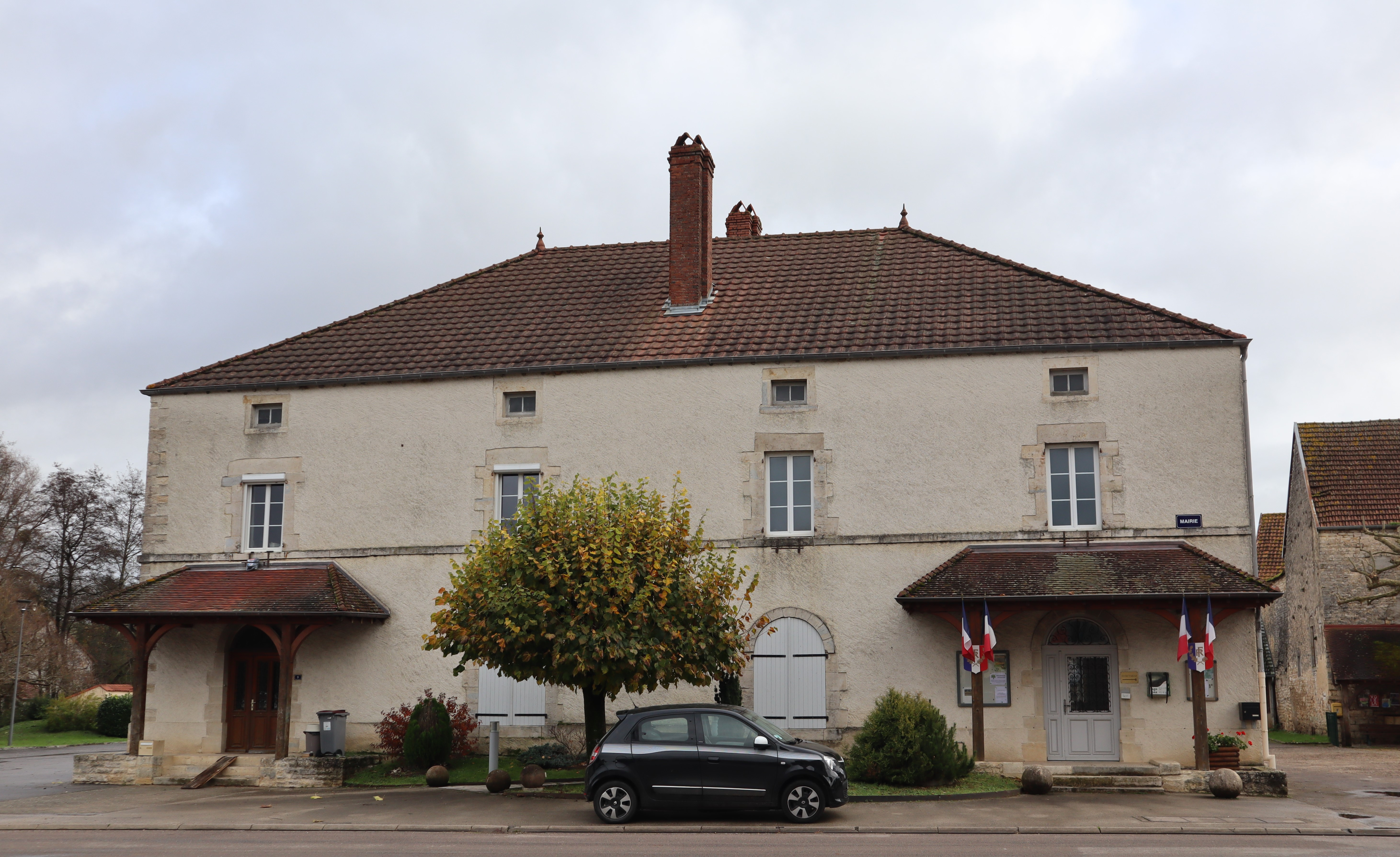
- Auvet-et-la-Chapelotte Town hall

- Coat of arms
- Location of Auvet-et-la-Chapelotte
- Location within France Location within Bourgogne-Franche-Comté
- Coordinates: 47°30′36″N 5°31′05″E
- Country: France
- Region: Bourgogne-Franche-Comté
- Department: Haute-Saône
- Arrondissement: Vesoul
- Canton: Dampierre-sur-Salon
- Intercommunality: CC Val de Gray

Government
  - Mayor (2020–2026): Thierry Beuchet
- Area^{1}: 14.43 km^{2} (5.57 sq mi)
- Highest elevation: 261 m (856 ft)
- Lowest elevation: 198 m (650 ft)
- Population (2023): 237
  - Density: 16.4/km^{2} (42.5/sq mi)
- Time zone: UTC+01:00 (CET)
  - Summer (DST): UTC+02:00 (CEST)
- INSEE/Postal code: 70043 /70100
- ^{1} French Land Register data, which excludes lakes, ponds, glaciers > 1 km^{2} (0.386 sq mi or 247 acres) and river estuaries.

Auvet-et-la-Chapelotte is a commune in the Haute-Saône department in the region of Bourgogne-Franche-Comté in eastern France.

== See also ==
- Communes of the Haute-Saône department
