= Pierrecourt, Haute-Saône =

Pierrecourt
- Commune
- Location of Pierrecourt
- Location within France Location within Bourgogne-Franche-Comté
- Coordinates: 47°38′40″N 5°35′26″E
- Country: France
- Region: Bourgogne-Franche-Comté
- Department: Haute-Saône
- Arrondissement: Vesoul
- Canton: Dampierre-sur-Salon

Government
  - Mayor (2020–2026): Jean-Luc Nee
- Area^{1}: 15.60 km^{2} (6.02 sq mi)
- Highest elevation: 362 m (1,188 ft)
- Lowest elevation: 244 m (801 ft)
- Population (2023): 103
  - Density: 6.60/km^{2} (17.1/sq mi)
- Time zone: UTC+01:00 (CET)
  - Summer (DST): UTC+02:00 (CEST)
- INSEE/Postal code: 70409 /70600
- ^{1} French Land Register data, which excludes lakes, ponds, glaciers > 1 km^{2} (0.386 sq mi or 247 acres) and river estuaries.

Pierrecourt (French pronunciation: [pjɛʁkuʁ]) is a commune in the Haute-Saône department in the region of Bourgogne-Franche-Comté in eastern France.

== See also ==
- Communes of the Haute-Saône department
