= Bèze Abbey =

Monastery in Côte-d'Or, in France

- Abbaye de Bèze
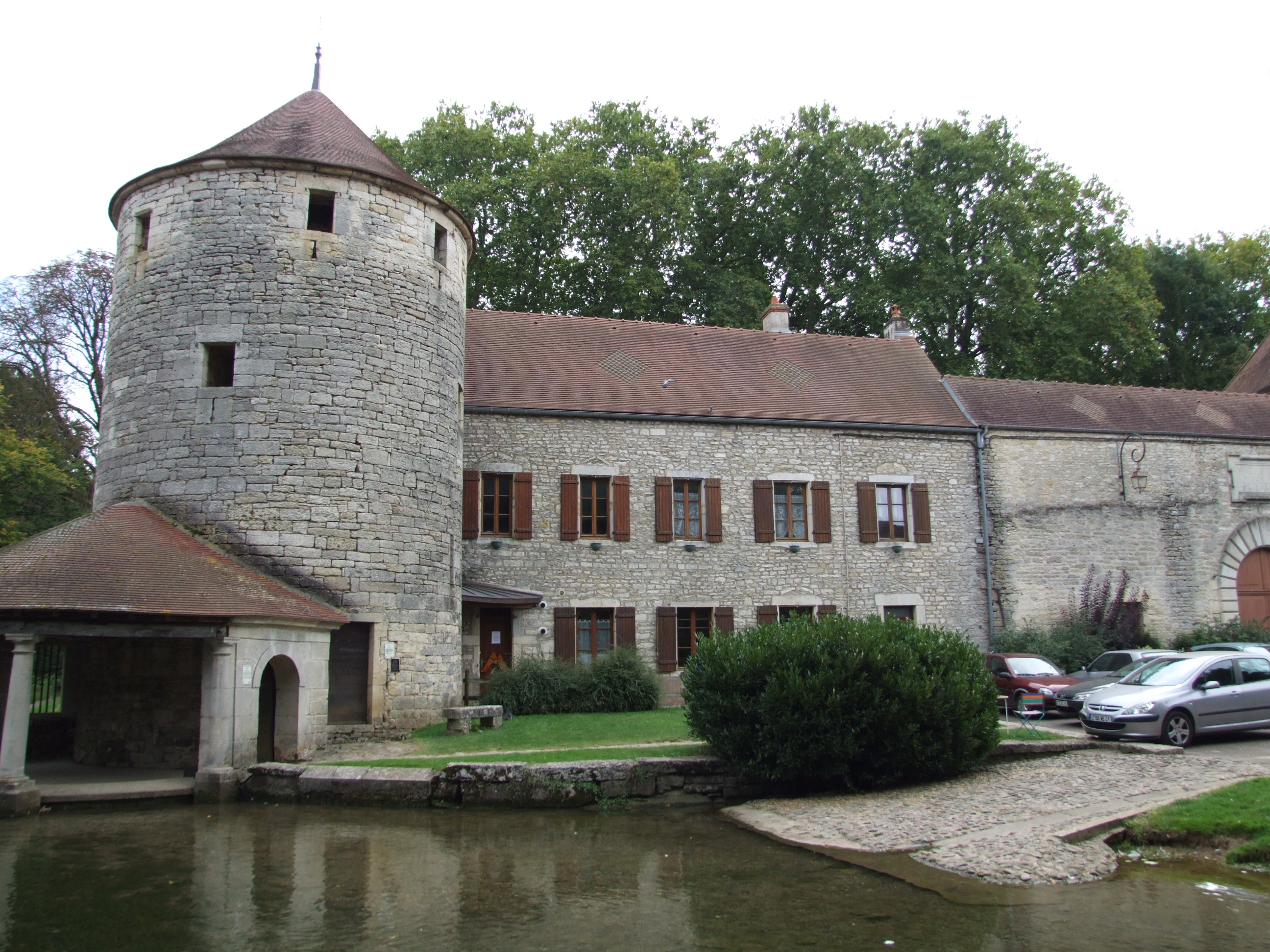
- Abbaye Saint-Pierre, Bèze river, northwest side. 15th century Oysel tower and 18th century wing

- Location within France
- Interactive map of Bèze Abbey

Monastery information
- Full name: Abbaye Saint-Pierre, Saint-Paul de Bèze
- Other name: Abbaye-de-la-Fontaine-de-Bèze
- Order: Order of Saint Benedict
- Established: 629
- Disestablished: 1789
- Diocese: Langres, Dijon from 1731

People
- Founders: Amalgaire, duke of the Attuarians

Architecture
- Status: Private property
- Functional status: Open to visitors
- Heritage designation: Monument historique (PA21000055)
- Designated date: 15 September 2010

Site
- Location: Bèze, Côte-d'Or, France
- Coordinates: 47.466978°N 5.272526°E
- Public access: yes
- Website: abbayedebeze.blogspot.com

The Bèze Abbey (French: Abbaye Saint-Pierre, Saint-Paul de Bèze), was a monastery founded in 629 AD in Burgundy, France. It was destroyed several times during the next three centuries by Frankish warlords, Saracens, Normans and Hungarians. At the end of the 10th century the abbey was re-founded and entered a golden age for the next two centuries. By the 13th century the spiritual life of the abbey had declined and the monks were mainly concerned with temporal matters. The abbey lost most of its monks during the Hundred Years' War and the Black Death of the 14th century. In 1429 it was fortified with stone walls, a moat and towers, two of which have survived. The abbey was again devastated by feuds in 1513, by the French Wars of Religion (1562–98) and by the Thirty Years' War (1618–48).

In 1662 a final revival began when the monastery came under the Congregation of Saint Maur. Most of the surviving buildings date from the reconstruction by this congregation in the 18th century. At the start of the French Revolution in 1789 the monastery was dissolved and the property taken over by the state. It was sold, and the church and main buildings demolished so the stone could be used for building. The owners of the property added an orangerie and laid out a park in the 19th century. Today the private owners have made the grounds and buildings open for visitors for a small fee.

== Foundation ==
The Abbey of Saint-Pierre & Saint-Paul (Note: Bèze Abbey is also known as Besuense Monasterium, St Pierre-de-Bèze and Abbaye-de-la-Fontaine-de-Bèze.) in Bèze, Côte-d'Or, was the fourth of the Merovingian abbeys of the diocese of Langres, after Moûtiers-Saint-Jean, Saint-Bénigne and Saint-Seine. The abbey was founded by Amalgaire, Duke of Lower Burgundy, brother of Waldalenus, Duke of Upper Burgundy and father of Saint Donatus of Besançon. Amalgaire founded the abbey in the reign of Chlothar II (r. 613–629) in the autumn of 629. (Note: The abbey's foundation date seems to be between 1 September and 18 October 629, when Clothar died.) The abbey's location was called the "Fountain of Bèze", after a karst spring that is the source of the Bèze river. The Chronique de Bèze from the first 3rd of the 12th century, describes foundation of the abbey on an unoccupied site. The Chronicle says:

He found a place between the Saône and Tille, where there sprang an important river called Bèze, with very clear waters, drinkable and rich in all sorts of fish. This river was not like the others which, along their course, increase by receiving streams; from its source, it is a great river. There are all kinds of herbs that can serve as food in case of scarcity ... The land is fairly good and bears abundant fruit if it is cultivated. The meadows are quite rich; it is possible to raise flocks. Forests surround this place; they are sufficient to provide timber and all that is necessary to man.

Amalgaire's wife Aquilina gave him two sons and one daughter, born between 595 and 605. His son Adalric would succeed him while his son Waldelene was educated as a monk at the Luxeuil Abbey under the Rule of Saint Columbanus. His daughter Adalsinde also became a nun. Waldelene became the first abbot at Bèze. Amalgaire also founded a monastery at Bregille on the right bank of the Doubs for his daughter Adalsinde, who became its first abbess. This monastery was given the existing Church of Saint Martin at Bregville. Amalgaire gave the Bèze Abbey a rich endowment of 31 domains with forests, vineyards and buildings, cultivators and winegrowers. He gave it vineyards in the Gevrey-Chambertin region that today are the source of the famous Chambertin-Clos de Bèze red Burgundy wine.

== Merovingian period (629–714) ==
The monks of Bèze followed the Rule of Saint Columbanus, which Waldalène brought from Luxeuil Abbey. The first buildings were a rectangular stone structure surrounded by wood and earth outbuildings with thatched roofs. After the death of Amalgaire around 655 civil war raged in Burgundy and the country was ravaged by rival bands of Neustrian and Austrasian Franks. The reign of Chlothar III (r. 657–673), son of Clovis II (r. 639–657), had just started in Austrasia in late 657 when civil disturbances made Brégille untenable. Adalsinde and her brother Adalric begged her brother Waldelène and his monks to give her and her nuns refuge in Bèze, and in return transferred to him the priests of Saint Martin.

Bèze was also ruined, its property titles destroyed and its monks scattered. When peace was restored Waldalene made haste to repair the losses of his monastery. To proceed faster he used credit from the new Duke of Burgundy, Sichelm. A diploma was issued by Chlothar III in 658 or 664 that confirmed the donations made by Amalgaire. Duke Adalric lost his duchy some time between 658 and 664. The king entrusted the lord Gengoul with the protection of the abbey. The duke, or his son Adalrich, Duke of Alsace, was restored to possession of the monastery of Bèze by the royal precept of 665. Adalric abused his authority to ransack the abbey. Later Adalric deserted King Theuderic III of Neustria (r. 673–691) and joined his enemies, who chose Dagobert II (r. 676–679) as King of Austrasia.

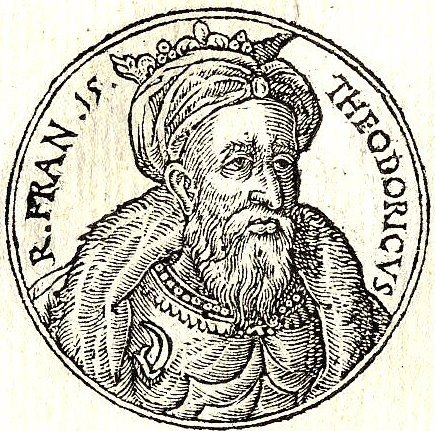
Theuderic III of Neustria

The war between Theuderic of Neustria and Dagobert of Austrasia once more devastated Bèze. Waldalène had to rebuild the abbey from ruins. In 676 Theuderic, now victorious, gave Waldalène all of Adalric's property. Adalric settled permanently in Alsace after the troubles of 675–676. Waldalène died in 680. The abbey flourished under the three abbots that followed, Bercand or Bercang, around 680, Ferréol around 700 and Syranne around 720.

== Carolingian period (714–990) ==
The Saracens, who had conquered Spain in 714, crossed the Pyrennees and devastated the south of France. They penetrated up the Rhône, the Saône and the Loire until finally defeated by Charles Martel at the Battle of Tours in 732. The Saracens sacked the abbey of Bèze around 730. Dom Jean Mabillon relates that they destroyed Autun, pulled down the Abbey of Bèze (monasterium Besuense), were repulsed from Sens when they attacked it in 732. The anthropologist Gustave Lagneau considered that some of the present population of the region showed signs of Saracen descent.

Between 751 and 754 King Pepin the Short (r. 751–768) gave the abbey to his concubine, Angla or Anglais wife of Théodard, to be desecrated or dilapidated by her according to her caprice. Pepin also dismissed the bishop of Langres at this time, and replaced him by his brother Remi. After this the abbey was entrusted to the bishops of Langres, but due to the difficulties of the times it was only rebuilt under the Emperor Louis the Pious (r. 814–840), when Bishop Albéric restored the buildings and reintroduced discipline.

Albéric was made Bishop of Langres by Louis the Pious around 820. The Chronicle of Bèze relates that Albéric was afflicted by a violent colic that made him despair of his life. An old man appeared to him in a dream and told him he would recover if he promised to reestablish the monastery. He made the promise and regained his health. Albéric gave Bèze the church of Saint Laurent in Beurey in 830. Louis the Pious visited Langres in 830 with his son Lothair and held a provincial council. This council and other synods seem to have resulted in the general reform that reestablished the common life of the canons and caused all the monasteries to restore their original rules. At Albéric's request Louis issued a charter that confirmed all the property of the abbey. (Note: A manuscript from Bèze states that the council at Langres in 830 granted the monks the tithes from certain vineyards donated to them by their founder. It is possible that this is a later fabrication used to support Bèze in a dispute with the canons of Langres.) Albéric repaired the church of Saint-Mammès at the abbey. Alberic died in 839 and his body was taken to Bèze on 22 December 839.

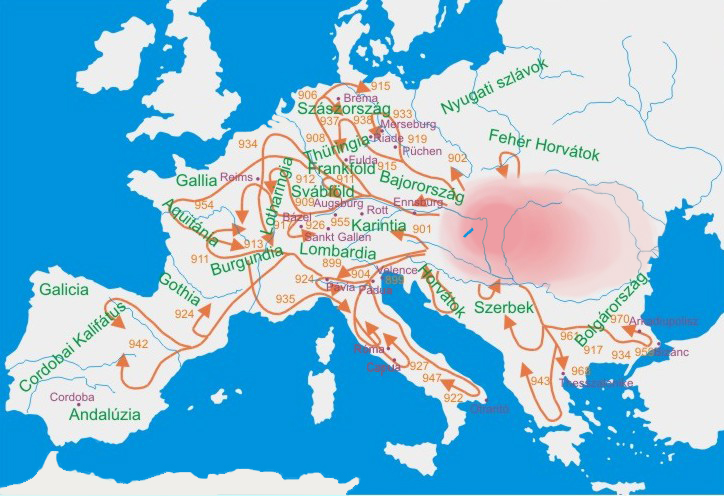
Hungarian campaigns in Europe

On 6 October 883 Geilon, bishop of Langres, gave the abbey of Bèze the relics of Saint Prudent de Narbonne, which he had brought back from a chapel in Narbonne after his pilgrimage to Santiago de Compostela. In 887, when marauding Normans approached the monks of Bèze transported the body of Saint Prudent to Saint-Etienne de Dijon. When the invasion was over the monks rebuilt the ruins of the abbey and asked for the saint's body from Dijon. The canons of Dijon at first refused, then at the command of Bishop Gauthier of Langres pretended to comply, but in fact gave the monks the body of Saint Silvin. Eventually the ruse was discovered, and the body of Saint Prudent was carried with great ceremony from Dijon to Bèze in 931.

The abbey was destroyed twice during the Hungarian invasions of Europe. It was burned in July 936 when the Hungarians came from Burgundy, and again the next year when the Hungarians had spread through France, Burgundy and Aquitaine, plundering and ravaging everywhere. The Hungarians caused so much damage to the monastery that it could not be restored for eleven years.

== Golden age (990–1200) ==
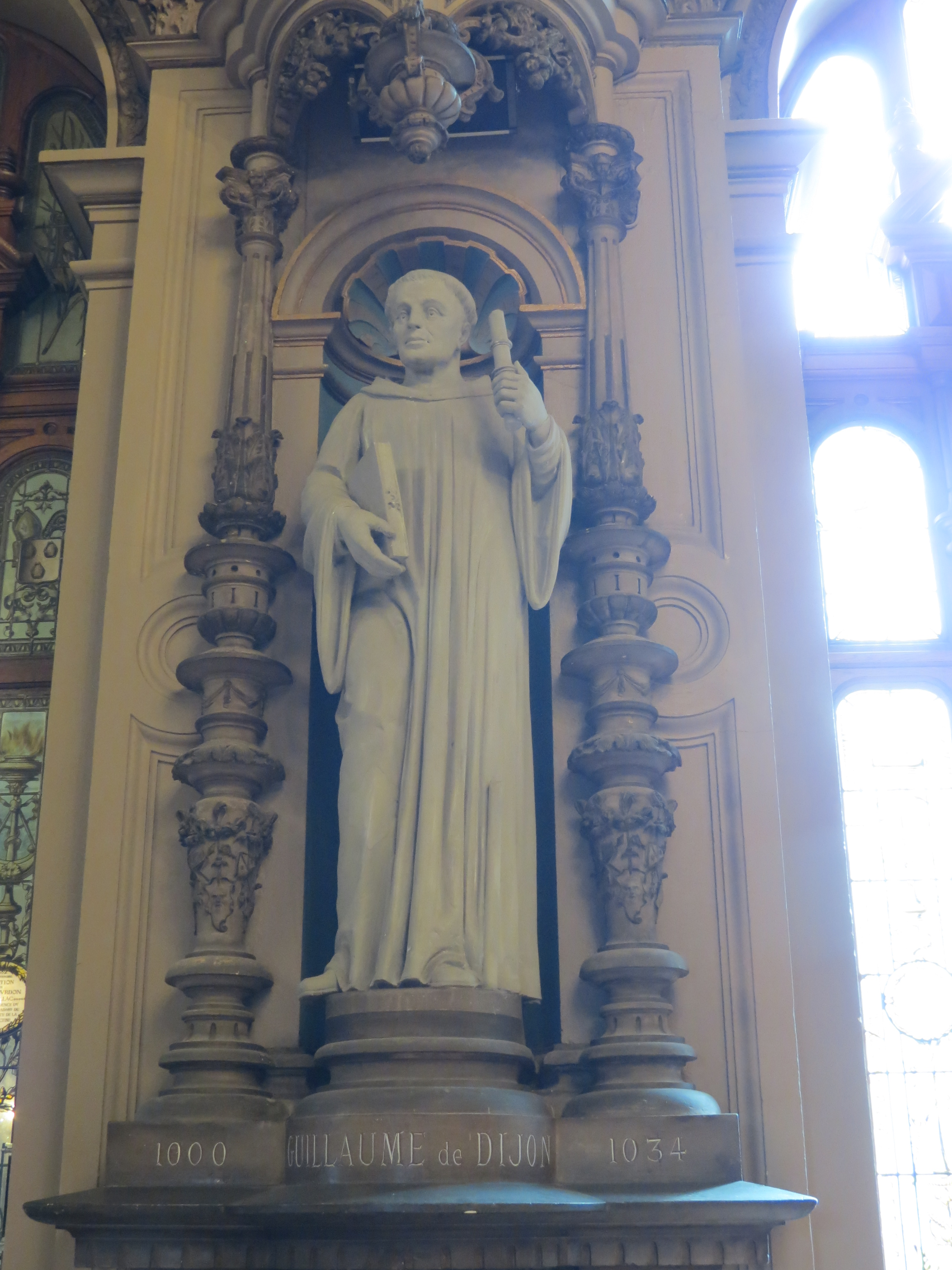
William of Volpiano, Abbot of Bèze from 990 to 1031

At the end of the 10th century Bruno de Roucy, Bishop of Langres, asked Majolus of Cluny to send monks to rebuild the abbeys of the Langres diocese. Among them was William of Volpiano, (Note: Much of what is known of William of Volpiano comes from the Life of St William of Dijon by Rodulphus Glaber, a former monk at Bèze and other abbeys who finally settled at Cluny. He is not a particularly reliable source.) who became abbot of Saint-Bénigne at Dijon, and was also abbot of Bèze from 990 until his death in 1031. William introduced the customs of Cluny to both abbeys. The Rule of Saint Benedict is first mentioned in the Chronicle of Beze when it comes to the William, an Italian who became abbot in 990. Unlike Saint-Bénigne, the properties of the abbey were concentrated in the immediate vicinity, towards Champlitte and the Saône. Thanks to William's reforms Bèze attracted gifts from local nobles such as the Fouvents, descendants of the counts of Atuyer, the Beaumonts and Montsaugeons towards Langres and the Beaujeus on the Saône. The property included serfs. For example, in the 11th century the abbey received the serf Arnulf and "one half of the sons or daughters of the said Arnulf" for the benefit of Sir Henri de Ferté's soul.

Raoul le Blanc, Viscount of Dijon, became a monk at Saint-Bénigne, then was made grand-prior of Bèze under abbot William and played a major role in the restoration of the abbey. Raoul dedicated his immense fortune to entirely rebuilding the abbey, including executing two ossuaries in the chapel of the Virgin and replacing the remains of the old destroyed tombs. He rebuilt the church on a larger scale, and it was dedicated in 1016 or 1018 in a ceremony arranged by Lambert de Vignory, Brunon's successor as bishop in a ceremony attended by many bishops and clergy from various provinces of France. In 1018 the lord of Fouvent founded the priory of Saint-Sépulcre beside his castle, subordinate to Bèze abbey.

Ulger or Olger 1, former prior of Beze, was abbot from 1031 to 1052. He died on return from a pilgrimage to Jerusalem. In October 1050 Pope Leo IX visited Langres, where he settled a dispute between the Bèze monks and the Langres canons over tithes from one of the monks' vineyards. He said that "By the authority of the Holy Fathers who preceded me in the see of Rome, it was permitted that no church founded in honour of St Peter, the prince of the Apostles, should pay a rent of tithes to another church." This silenced the canons. In 1066 a solemn assembly of bishops, abbots and local lords was held at the abbey of Bèze to settle difference between the abbot of Saint-Benigne and the officers of Robert, Duke of Burgundy. In 1083 Ponce, lord of the Château de Beaujeu, gave the abbey a chapel built in honour of Saint Vallier with lands and various rights.

Étienne de Joinville^{(fr)} was the son and grandson of counts on his father's side, and grandson of Arnoul, count of Reynel on his mother's side. He served as a soldier before becoming a monk. He was a monk at the Priory of Saint-Oyan-de-Bar and then at Cluny, where his uncle Widon was Grand Prior. He was appointed prior at Sainte-Germaine de Bar-sur-Aube, then of Bar-sur-Seine. In 1088 he was chosen as abbot of Bèze by bishop Robert. Under the abbot Étienne de Jonvelle (c. 1088–1124) the grants multiplied, particularly in the form of restitution of churches. Humbert de Fouvent, who had been killed in the service of the Bishop of Langres around 1085–87, was buried at Bèze. His widow gave the abbey the chapel of his castle, the church of Lavoncourt and two silver cyphes. In 1093 Irmuin de Seveux gave the abbey the churches of Saint-Denis and Saint-Laurent. Pope Paschal II stayed at the abbey in 1107. He was accompanied by Henry of Poitou, then Abbot of Saint-Jean-d'Angély.

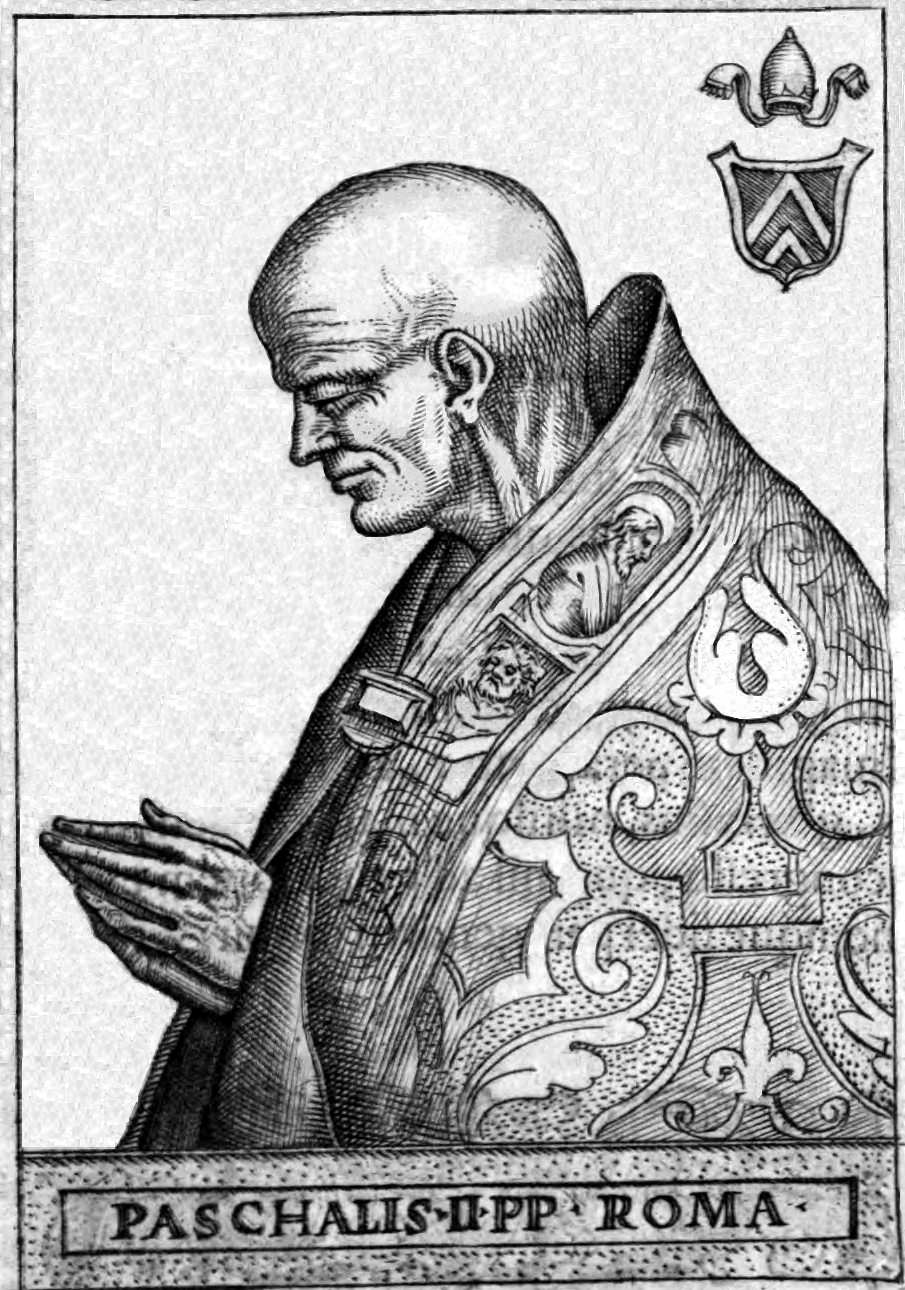
Pope Paschal II

Étienne doubled the size of the abbey's domain by restitution and donations, and expanded the abbey buildings, extending the church to the river. (Note: Étienne de Joinville's epitaph says ecclesiae caput extendit super amnem (he extended the church head on the river).) There are still remains of an axial chapel from the early 12th century. This is all that is left of Étienne's buildings. The chapels would have extended towards the Bèze river from the apse of the church. (Note: The chapels today are buried due to the work of the abbot Jean de Sauveboeuf around 1680, who raised the river level to obtain a greater head of water to power the abbey forges. He dumped over 4,000 cart loads of earth and stone into the river to raise its bed. The complaints by the people of Bèze to the Intendant of Langres about the abbot's action have been preserved.) Under Étienne's rule the number of monks grew to about 50 living in the abbey and another 50 in subordinate priories. The monk Jean (died 1120) wrote the Chronicon Besuense, a history of the abbey from its foundation to the start of the 12th century. The monk Teobaudus (died 1130) wrote the Miracula Sancti Prudentii, which described the miraculous cures that had been effected by the relics of Saint Prudent. The monk Raoul the Bald wrote the Libri Quinque Historiae, a history of events from 900 to 1044. He famously wrote of the period, "At that time the kingdom of France was covered with a white cloak of churches." In 1198 the abbey was accidentally burned.

== Feudalism, decline and ruin (1200–1662) ==
In 1215 the abbot Albert received a letter from Pope Innocent III on the subject of damages caused by a fire which had forced the abbot to send the monks to Cluny. In 1219 the abbey finally accepted an offer that had first been made in 1049 and sold its Clos de Bèze vineyard to the canons of Langres. (Note: The Cathedral Chapter of Saint-Mammès at Langres was the nominal owner of the Clos de Bèze vineyards until the French Revolution, but in the 17th century it leased them to lay owners.) Over time the rule was relaxed and the monks became more concerned with temporal than spiritual matters. In 1253 the abbot Geoffroy II was the first to hold the feudal title "Baron de Bèze". Around 1280 the abbot Girard III built a school outside the village for children who were not destined for the church. The building on the Place de Verdun still stands. The archives tell of disputes between the abbot and the bishop of Langres, disputes between the monks and the people of Bèze, disputes with the local lords, disputes over feudal dues and rights of use. In 1307 a dispute between the Bèze Abbey and some burgesses of the abbey was heard first by the Jours de Troyes, then escalated to the king's Parlement.

The Hundred Years' War began in 1337. The Black Death appeared in Marseille, then spread throughout France in 1348–49. Some thought the world was ending, and others thought God was punishing France for her sins. Guillaume de Chanac became abbot in 1352. He later became bishop of Chartres and a cardinal. In 1389 a complaint was lodged by 15 officers and monks of the abbey against the abbot Thiéry de Charmes concerning maladministration of the neighboring school. The award, issued by the court of Langes on the Saturday before Pentecost, meticulously itemized the rights and duties of the abbot. These included the requirement to supply wine to the master and clerics of Bèze to drink after vigils.

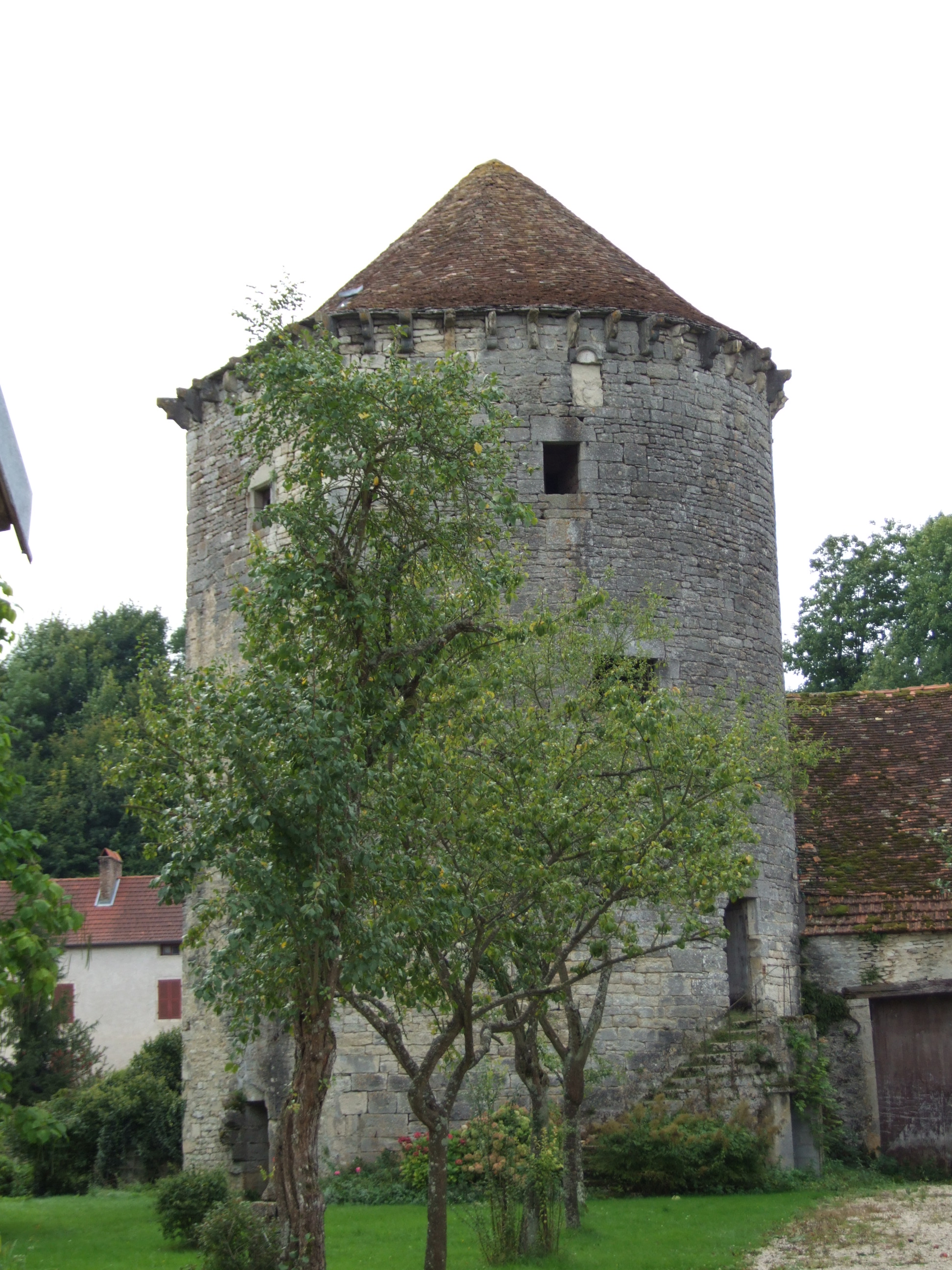
Chaix Tower in the south

Simon de Torcenay was abbot from 1423 until his death in 1444. He repaired the buildings and strengthened the fortifications. In 1425 he built the first forges on the Bèze. He was a "warrior monk" and fortified the abbey with walls surrounded by a moat and accessed over a drawbridge He built a second line of walls to fortify the village. Around 1428 Claus de Werve made a polychromed limestone statue of the Virgin and Child for the abbey, which was installed in the Church of Saint-Martin at Bézouotte and has survived. Construction of the fortified enclosure began in 1429. The Chaux tower in the south and the Oysel tower in the north still stand, and carry the arms of Simon de Torcenay. In 1433 there was a risk of rebellion by the lords of Château-Vilain, Grancey and Vergy against the Duke of Burgundy. On 10 May 1433 the duke addressed letters patent to the monks and people of Bèze telling them to remain faithful to the king of France and refuse entry to any stranger or enemy. That year he invited the abbot Simon de Torcenay, his councilor and chamberlain, to attend a solemn ceremony of a chapter of the Order of the Golden Fleece.

Bèze was devastated by the war between the Duchy of Burgundy and Franche-Comté, in which the Swiss invaded in 1513. During the French Wars of Religion the Bishop of Langres supported Henry IV of France but Bèze was occupied by forces of the Catholic League. In 1592 there were only six monks and two novices left. With the introduction of the "commende" system the abbot was appointed by the king and had sole responsibility for managing the property. Abbots, living outside the abbey, kept most of the income and granted the monks the bare minimum. In 1615 the lay lord Charles de Ferrières was appointed abbot.

In 1636, as a precaution, the relics of the Abbey of Bèze were deposited with the Abbey of Saint-Bénigne in Dijon. They were brought back from there 22 years later. During the Thirty Years' War in 1636 the Austrian army of Matthias Gallas ravaged the Vingeanne valley. Swedish mercenaries, nominally allies of France, destroyed what was left. The abbey was ruined, with only a few monks left, each living in a small house they had built for themselves.

== Last revival (1662–1789) ==
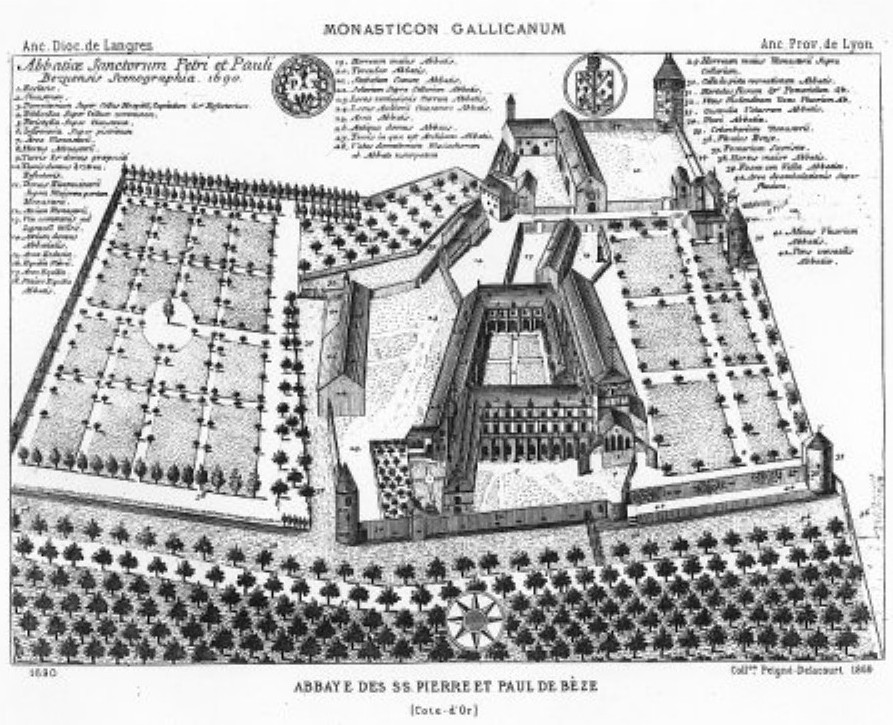
Bèze Abbey in 1690

In 1662 a final revival of the monastery began with the arrival of 12 monks of the Congregation of Saint-Maur. The Congregation of St Maur had been granted letters patent by Louis XIII in 1618 to manage the reformed monasteries of France. It contained more than 180 monasteries by the end of the 17th century. The congregation enforced a return to the strict Rule of Saint Benedict. It is best known for its scholarship, including historical research, biblical studies, chronology and liturgy. The abbey was probably partially rebuilt in the 17th century. In 1731 the abbey and its revenues were transferred to the newly created Bishopric of Dijon. It was now administered by a simple "prior" rather than an abbot, and depended on the bishop for funding.

The Congrégation de Saint-Maur planned a reconstruction program for the abbey, with plans that provided more southern light and air to the monks' cells. The buildings and Saint Peter and Paul church were destroyed and rebuilt from 1738, using materials from the old building. The initial plans were changed in 1769 under the direction of the architect Charles Saint-Père, who conceived a large building south of the church. It had a central section holding the refectory and the dormitory, with two wings. Of the 113 metres (371 ft) long "monastic palace", the wings have survived but the main building, which held the cells of the monks on the first floor, has been destroyed.

The buildings included an infirmary, guest rooms for distinguished visitors, a library that had 4,175 volumes according to the May 1790 inventory and apartments for the Cellerier and Sous-Cellerier, who looked after the material life of the abbey. The west wing held a large library on the second floor. A cloister gallery runs along the central north side. There is a storehouse arranged symmetrically with the west wing. The church was roughly the same as the former church, but somewhat shortened and no longer extending to the river.

== Post-revolution (1789–present) ==
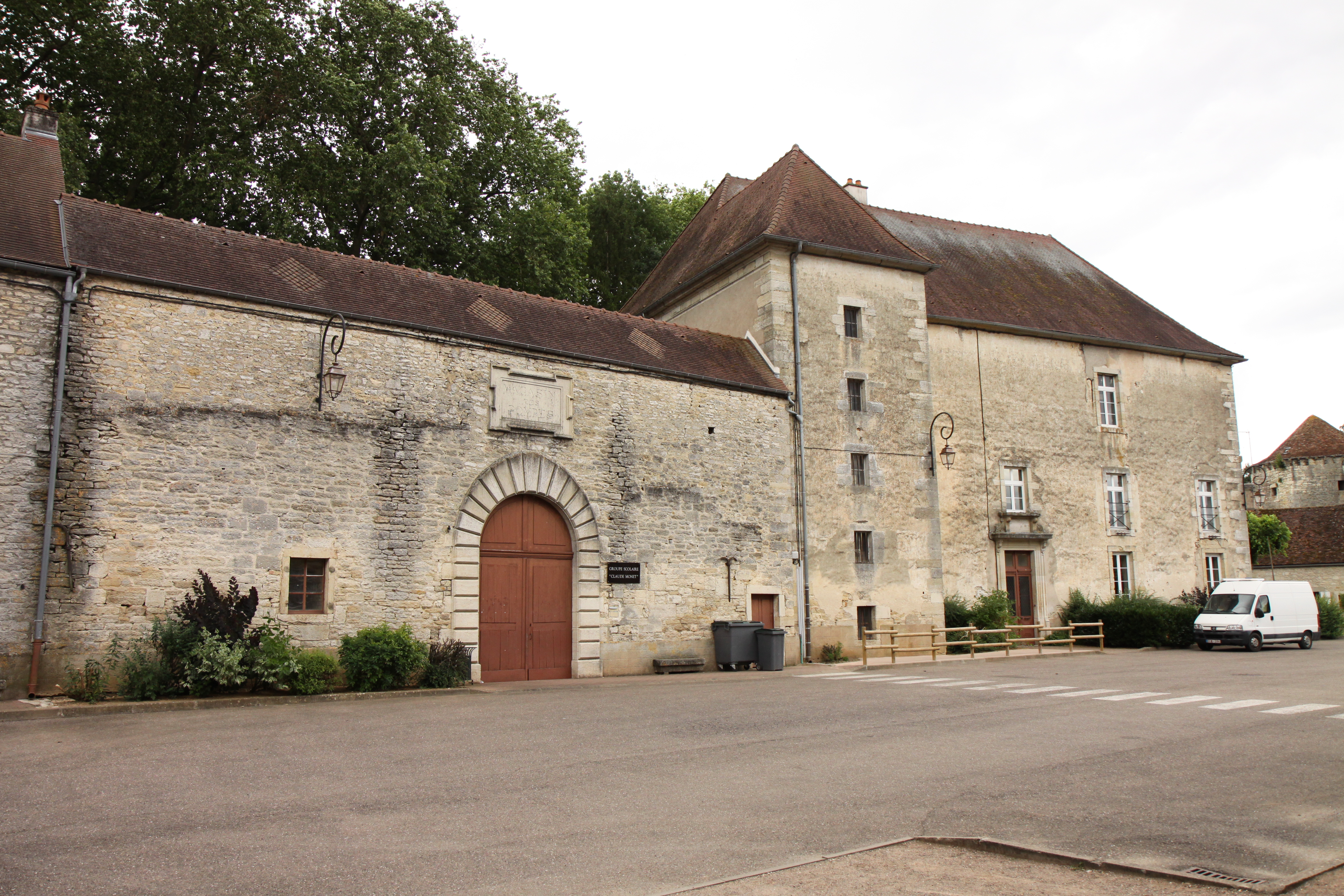
View from the northwest

At the start of the French Revolution, on 2 November 1789 the Constituent Assembly decreed nationalization of the lands of the church and the religious houses. The monks were turned out of the abbeys and left to look after themselves. In May 1790 the municipality of Bèze made an inventory of the monks' property. The last three monks left in January 1791. The municipality acquired the storehouse to hold the town hall and the school.

In August 1791 a Langres paper maker named Faitout obtained possession of the other buildings. After a failed spinning project the abbey church began to be destroyed around 1796 and the stones sold. The central part of the buildings was demolished in 1805. The former "convent house" was sold in 1804 to Frédéric Rochet, an ironmaster. The property then passed through several hands before being acquired by the Dijon industrialist Philippe Breuil in 1872, whose descendants owned the property as of 2014. The forges on the Belle Ile en Bèze operated until the end of the 19th century, when they were replaced by a hydroelectric power station, which operated until the 1960s. Sheds, stables and an orangerie in the southwest were built after 1845 and a park laid out. The English-style park was planted with many unusual trees in the 19th century and includes a flower garden with old roses.

The site has a total area of 4 hectares (9.9 acres). There are two 4-level horseshoe towers from the old enclosure. The Oysel tower to the north has had its internal divisions destroyed. The Chaix tower to the west has a vaulted ground floor and 2nd and 3rd floors reached by a stairway in the thickness of the wall. Of the main structure what remains are two symmetrical buildings with basements and two floors. There is an elongated building to the east and remains of other structures including a barrel-vaulted chapel. The axial chapel survives with two pilasters and their capitals. The east and west wings of the 18th century convent building, the Chaux and Oysel towers including the washhouse, the floor of the old church and the axial chapel, facades, roofs and cellar structure were registered as Monuments Historiques on 15 September 2010. The property is privately owned. Both the park and gardens are open to visitors, for a small fee.

== Sources ==
- Abbaye de Bèze (in French), Association des Amis de l'Abbaye de Bèze
- Abbaye de Bèze (in French), Comité Régional du Tourisme de Bourgogne-Franche-Comté, 2014
- Abbaye Saint Pierre de Bèze (4 ha) (in French), Comité des Parcs et Jardins de France
- "Ancienne abbaye bénédictine Saint-Pierre et Saint-Paul", Mérimée (in French), Ministère de la Culture
- Béguillet, Edme (1848), Description générale et particulière du Duché de Bourgogne (in French), V. Lagier
- Benton, John F. (1991-07-01), Culture, Power and Personality in Medieval France, Bloomsbury Publishing, ISBN 978-0-8264-3298-8
- Brasart, Jérôme (24 February 2014), "Bèze (Abbaye Saint-Pierre)", www.mauristes.org (in French)
- "Dans l'ancienne abbaye de Bèze la nécropole s'entrouve", Bulletin de la Société historique et archeologique de Langres (in French), 1959
- Choullier, L'Abbe E. (1879), "Recherches sur les origines de Beurey et de Vendeuvre (Aube)", Revue de Champagne et de Brie (in French)
- Chronicon beanense (in French), Garnier (Analecta divionensia)
- Clark, Cecily (July 1969), "'This Ecclesiastical Adventurer': Henry of Saint-Jean d'Angély", The English Historical Review, 84 (332), Oxford University Press: 548–560, doi:10.1093/ehr/LXXXIV.CCCXXXII.548, JSTOR 562484
- Coates, Clive (2008-05-12), The Wines of Burgundy, University of California Press, ISBN 978-0-520-25050-5
- Constable, Giles (1964-01-03), Monastic Tithes: From Their Origins to the Twelfth Century, Cambridge University Press, ISBN 978-0-521-04715-9
- Coulton, G. G. (2012-08-09), The Medieval Village, Courier Corporation, ISBN 978-0-486-15860-0
- Débax, Hélène (2008), Vicomtes et vicomtés dans l'Occident médiéval (in French), Presses Univ. du Mirail, ISBN 978-2-85816-942-9
- Dunod de Charnage, François Ignace (1750), Histoire de l'eglise, ville et diocése de Besançon, qui comprend la suite des prélats de cette métropole depuis la fin du second siécle, leur vie, leurs actions (in French), Chez C. J. Daclin
- Duplus, H. M. (1866), Vie des Saints du diocèse de Dijon (in French), Gagey
- Dupraz, Louis (1961), "Le Premier Duché de Bourgogne", Memoires et Documents : Société d'Histoire et d'archéologie de Genève (in French), vol. XL, Librairie Droz, ISBN 978-2-600-05015-9
- Gaspard, B. (1843), Histoire de Gigny: au département du jura, de sa noble et royale abbaye, et de Saint Taurin, son patron : suivie de pièces justificatives (in French), Impr. et lithog. de F. Gauthier
- Guillon, Aimé (1817), Preuve de la fidélité des français a leur rois légitimes, lors du passage de la première a la seconde dynastie (in French), chez L.G. Michaud, imprimeur-libraire, rue des Bons enfants, n°. 34; et H. Nicolle, libraire, rue de Seine, n°. 12
- Kleinclausz, A. (1895), "L'art Roman en Bourgogne", Revue bourguignonne (in French)
- Lagneau, Gustave (1870), "On the Saracens in France, especially in Burgundy and Lorraine", Memoirs Read Before the Anthropological Society of London, 1867-8-9, Longmans, Green
- Lauvergeon, Bernard (2000), "Abbaye de Bénédictins Saint-Pierre, Saint-Paul", Mérimée (in French), Ministère de la Culture
  - Base Mérimée: Abbaye de Bénédictins Saint-Pierre, Saint-Paul, Ministère français de la Culture. (in French)
- Lewis, Gwynne (2002), The French Revolution: Rethinking the Debate, Routledge, ISBN 978-1-134-93741-7
- Mangen, Abbé de (1765), Histoire ecclésiastique et civile, politique, littéraire et topographique du diocése de Langres, et de celui de Dijon, qui en est un démembrement (in French), Bauche
- Marillier, J.; Velard, Roland (1958), "Bèze – son histoire, son site, sa grotte", Sous le Plancher – Bulletin du S.C. Dijon (in French) (2): 35–40
- Muteau, Charles François T. (1882), Les écoles et collèges en province ... jusqu'en 1789 (in French)
- O'Carroll, James (Winter 1953), "Monastic Rules in Merovingian Gaul", Studies: An Irish Quarterly Review, 42 (168), Irish Province of the Society of Jesus: 407–419, JSTOR 30098493
- Parker, Robert M. (2010-03-02), Burgundy: A Comprehensive Guide to the Producers, Appelatio, Simon and Schuster, ISBN 978-1-4391-4210-3
- Pettegree, Andrew (2007-09-21), The French Book and the European Book World, BRILL, ISBN 978-90-474-2197-9
- Pitte, Jean-Robert (2012-07-09), Bordeaux/Burgundy: A Vintage Rivalry, Univ of California Press, ISBN 978-0-520-27455-6
- Roussel, Charles François (1878), La diocèse de Langres: histoire et statistique (in French), J. Dallet
- Seward, Desmond (1999-08-01), The Hundred Years War: The English in France 1337–1453, Penguin Publishing Group, ISBN 978-1-101-17377-0
- Tems, Hugues Du (1775), Le clergé de France, ou tableau historique et chronologique des archevêques, évêques, abbés, abbesses et chefs des chapitres principaux du royaume, depuis la fondation des églises jusqu'à nos jours, par M. l'abbé Hugues Du Tems (in French), Brunet
- Toke, Leslie Alexander St. Lawrence (1911). "Maurists" . Catholic Encyclopedia. Vol. 10.
- Vergnolle, Eliane (2001), La création architecturale en Franche-Comté au XIIe siècle: du roman au gothique (in French), Presses Univ. Franche-Comté, ISBN 978-2-84627-006-9
- Williams, Watkin Wynn (1938), Monastic Studies, Manchester University Press, GGKEY:E2DZXES9749
- Winter, Patrick M. de (December 1987), "Art from the Duchy of Burgundy", The Bulletin of the Cleveland Museum of Art, 74 (10, Art from the Duchy of Burgundy), Cleveland Museum of Art: 406–449, JSTOR 25160010
- Wittberg, Patricia (1994), The Rise and Fall of Catholic Religious Orders: A Social Movement Perspective, SUNY Press, ISBN 978-0-7914-2229-8
- Wood, Ian (2014-06-23), The Merovingian Kingdoms 450 - 751, Taylor & Francis, ISBN 978-1-317-87115-6
