= Remilly-sur-Tille =

- Commune
- Coat of arms
- Location of Remilly-sur-Tille
- Location within France Location within Bourgogne-Franche-Comté
- Coordinates: 47°19′07″N 5°12′32″E
- Country: France
- Region: Bourgogne-Franche-Comté
- Department: Côte-d'Or
- Arrondissement: Dijon
- Canton: Saint-Apollinaire

Government
  - Mayor (2020–2026): Claude Guichet
- Area^{1}: 9.80 km^{2} (3.78 sq mi)
- Highest elevation: 237 m (778 ft)
- Lowest elevation: 203 m (666 ft)
- Population (2023): 1,015
  - Density: 104/km^{2} (268/sq mi)
- Time zone: UTC+01:00 (CET)
  - Summer (DST): UTC+02:00 (CEST)
- INSEE/Postal code: 21521 /21560
- Website: www.remilly-sur-tille.fr
- ^{1} French Land Register data, which excludes lakes, ponds, glaciers > 1 km^{2} (0.386 sq mi or 247 acres) and river estuaries.

Remilly-sur-Tille is a commune in the Côte-d'Or department in eastern France.

== Population ==
Historical population
Year	Pop.	±% p.a.
1968	314	—
1975	382	+2.84%
1982	433	+1.81%
1990	686	+5.92%
1999	733	+0.74%
2007	803	+1.15%
2012	783	−0.50%
2017	878	+2.32%
2023	1,015	+2.45%
Source: INSEE

== See also ==
- Communes of the Côte-d'Or department
