= Beire-le-Châtel =

- Commune
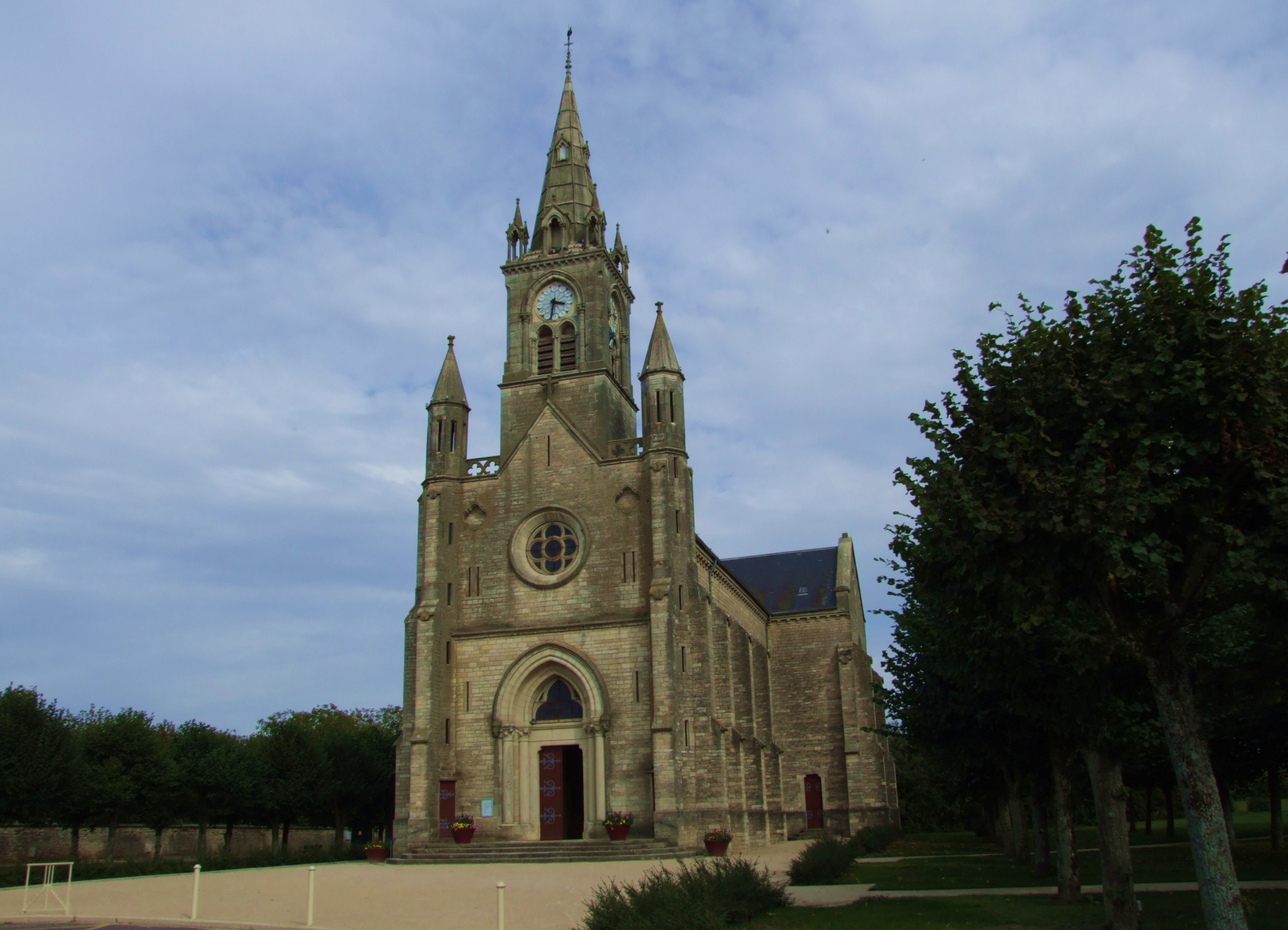
- The church in Beire-le-Châtel

- Coat of arms
- Location of Beire-le-Châtel
- Location within France Location within Bourgogne-Franche-Comté
- Coordinates: 47°24′47″N 5°12′21″E
- Country: France
- Region: Bourgogne-Franche-Comté
- Department: Côte-d'Or
- Arrondissement: Dijon
- Canton: Saint-Apollinaire

Government
  - Mayor (2020–2026): Laurent Boisserolles
- Area^{1}: 19.25 km^{2} (7.43 sq mi)
- Elevation: 250 m (820 ft)
- Highest elevation: 305 m (1,001 ft)
- Lowest elevation: 215 m (705 ft)
- Population (2023): 921
  - Density: 47.8/km^{2} (124/sq mi)
- Time zone: UTC+01:00 (CET)
  - Summer (DST): UTC+02:00 (CEST)
- INSEE/Postal code: 21056 /21310
- ^{1} French Land Register data, which excludes lakes, ponds, glaciers > 1 km^{2} (0.386 sq mi or 247 acres) and river estuaries.

Beire-le-Châtel (French pronunciation: [bɛʁ lə ʃatɛl]) is a commune in the Côte-d'Or department in eastern France.

== Population ==
Historical population
Year	Pop.	±% p.a.
1968	502	—
1975	539	+1.02%
1982	552	+0.34%
1990	539	−0.30%
1999	620	+1.57%
2007	787	+3.03%
2012	806	+0.48%
2017	860	+1.31%
2023	921	+1.15%
Source: INSEE

== See also ==
- Communes of the Côte-d'Or department
