= Trochères =

- Commune
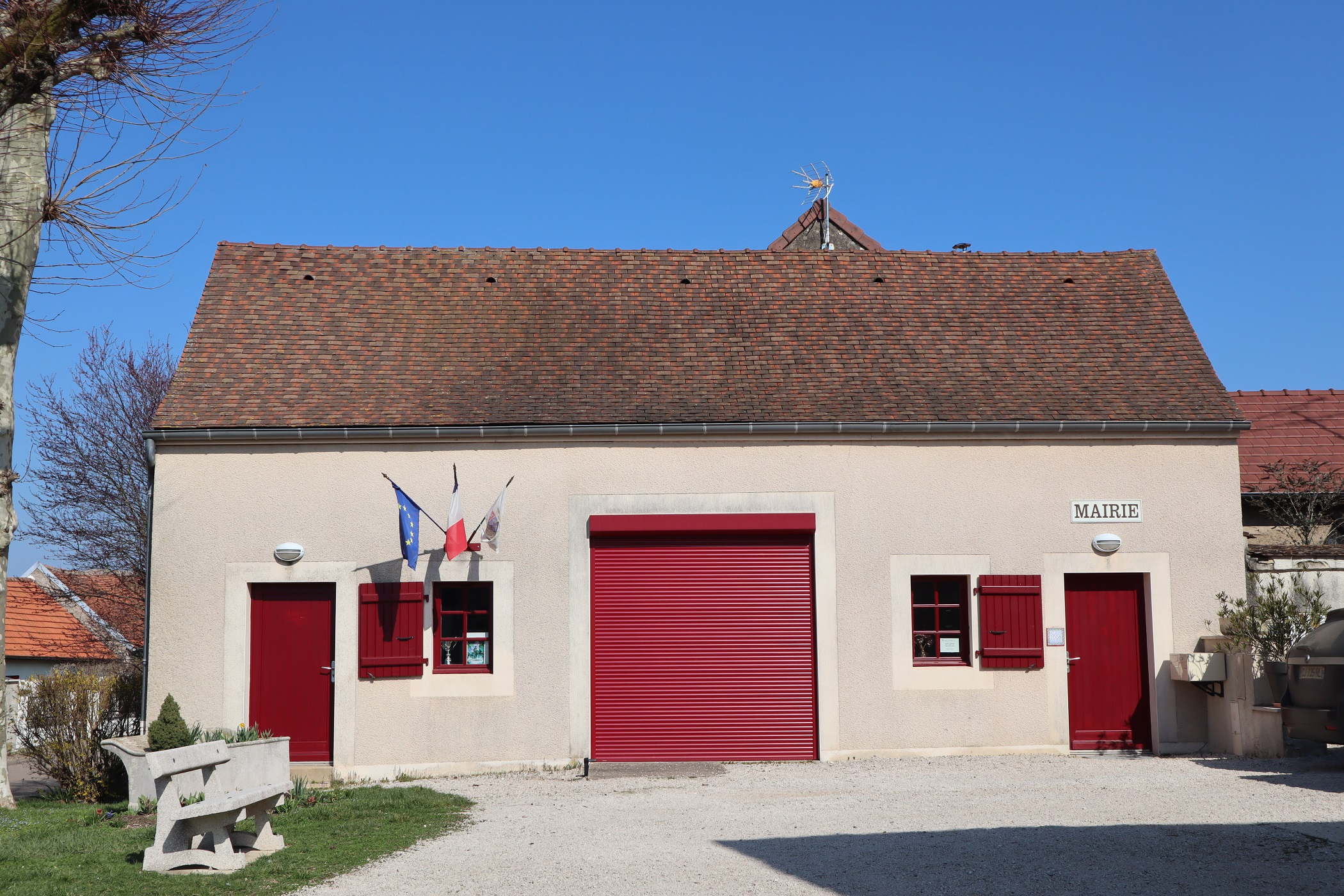
- Town hall

- Coat of arms
- Location of Trochères
- Location within France Location within Bourgogne-Franche-Comté
- Coordinates: 47°20′43″N 5°18′23″E
- Country: France
- Region: Bourgogne-Franche-Comté
- Department: Côte-d'Or
- Arrondissement: Dijon
- Canton: Saint-Apollinaire

Government
  - Mayor (2020–2026): Nathalie Gavoille
- Area^{1}: 5.1 km^{2} (2.0 sq mi)
- Elevation: 195 m (640 ft)
- Highest elevation: 206 m (676 ft)
- Lowest elevation: 188 m (617 ft)
- Population (2023): 166
  - Density: 33/km^{2} (84/sq mi)
- Time zone: UTC+01:00 (CET)
  - Summer (DST): UTC+02:00 (CEST)
- INSEE/Postal code: 21644 /21310
- ^{1} French Land Register data, which excludes lakes, ponds, glaciers > 1 km^{2} (0.386 sq mi or 247 acres) and river estuaries.

Trochères (French pronunciation: [tʁɔʃɛʁ]) is a commune in the Côte-d'Or department in eastern France.

== Population ==
Historical population
Year	Pop.	±% p.a.
1968	101	—
1975	83	−2.77%
1982	129	+6.50%
1990	118	−1.11%
1999	136	+1.59%
2007	169	+2.75%
2012	168	−0.12%
2017	169	+0.12%
2023	166	−0.30%
Source: INSEE

== See also ==
- Communes of the Côte-d'Or department
