= Jancigny =

- Commune
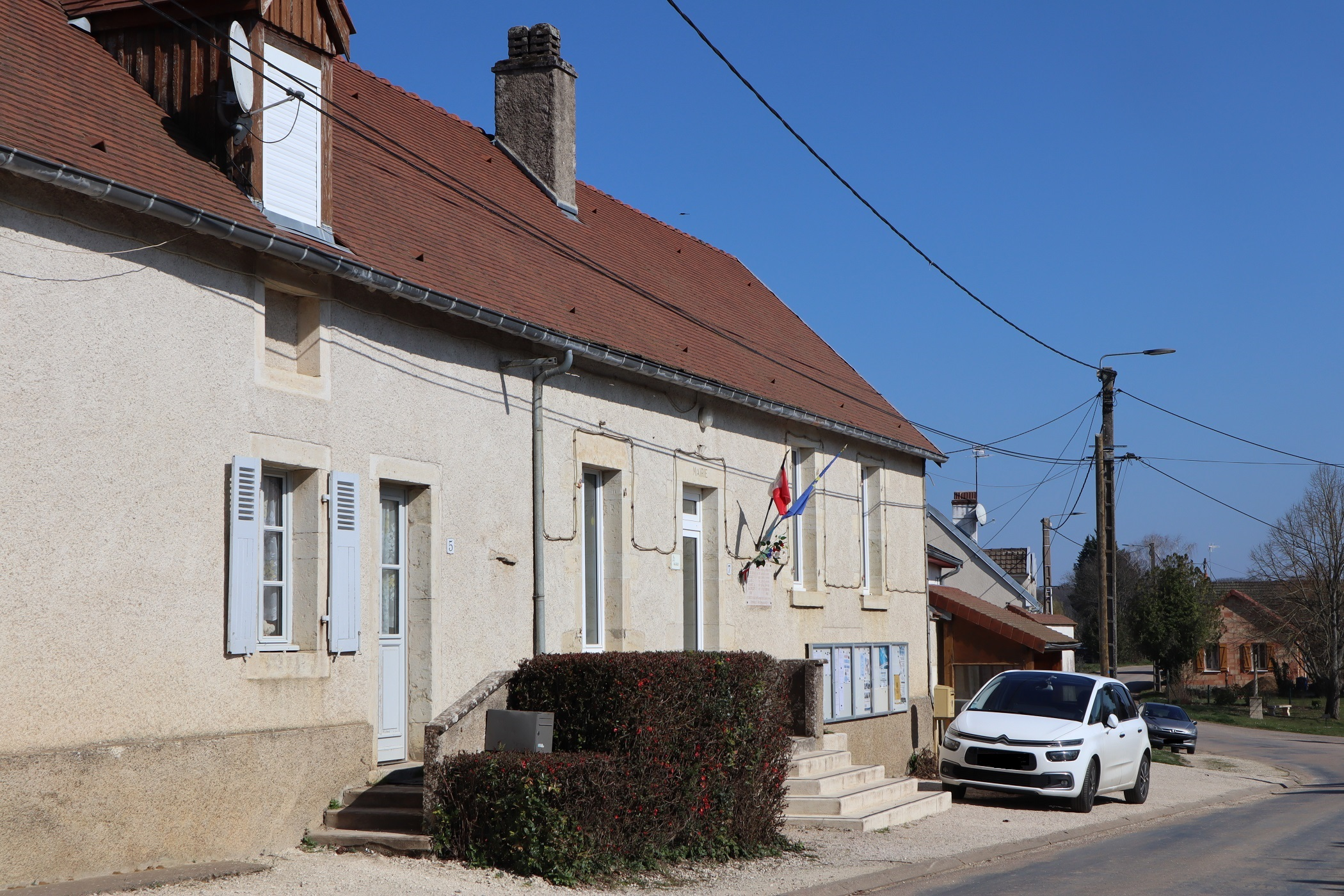
- Town hall

- Coat of arms
- Location of Jancigny
- Location within France Location within Bourgogne-Franche-Comté
- Coordinates: 47°23′04″N 5°24′32″E
- Country: France
- Region: Bourgogne-Franche-Comté
- Department: Côte-d'Or
- Arrondissement: Dijon
- Canton: Saint-Apollinaire

Government
  - Mayor (2020–2026): Denis Jacquot
- Area^{1}: 6.95 km^{2} (2.68 sq mi)
- Elevation: 200 m (660 ft)
- Highest elevation: 230 m (750 ft)
- Lowest elevation: 192 m (630 ft)
- Population (2023): 155
  - Density: 22.3/km^{2} (57.8/sq mi)
- Time zone: UTC+01:00 (CET)
  - Summer (DST): UTC+02:00 (CEST)
- INSEE/Postal code: 21323 /21310
- ^{1} French Land Register data, which excludes lakes, ponds, glaciers > 1 km^{2} (0.386 sq mi or 247 acres) and river estuaries.

Jancigny (French pronunciation: [ʒɑ̃siɲi]) is a commune in the Côte-d'Or department in eastern France.

== Population ==
Historical population
Year	Pop.	±% p.a.
1968	77	—
1975	72	−0.95%
1982	78	+1.15%
1990	87	+1.37%
1999	100	+1.56%
2007	120	+2.31%
2012	136	+2.53%
2017	141	+0.72%
2023	155	+1.59%
Source: INSEE

== See also ==
- Communes of the Côte-d'Or department
