= Viévigne =

- Commune
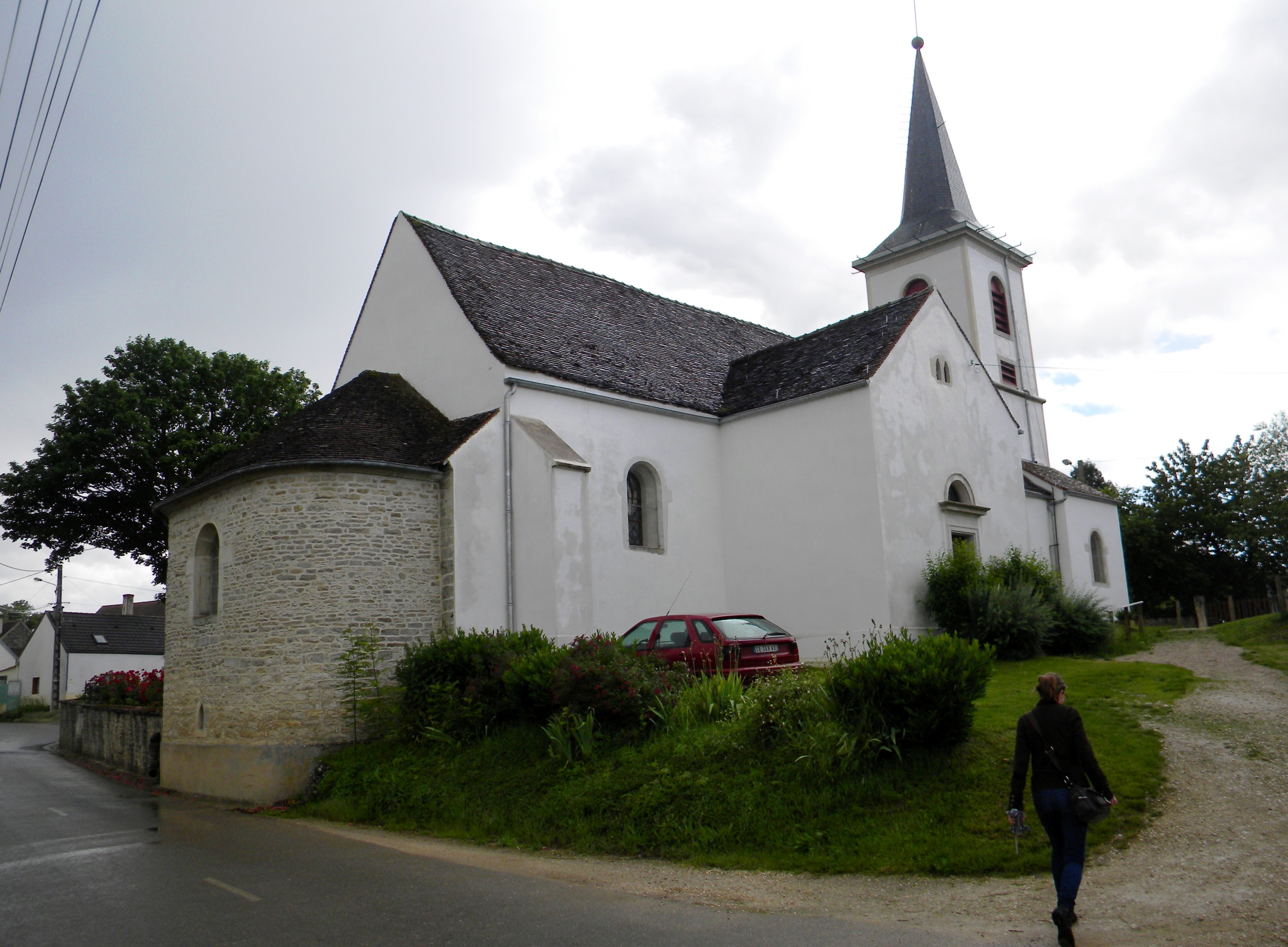
- The church in Viévigne

- Coat of arms
- Location of Viévigne
- Location within France Location within Bourgogne-Franche-Comté
- Coordinates: 47°26′09″N 5°13′52″E
- Country: France
- Region: Bourgogne-Franche-Comté
- Department: Côte-d'Or
- Arrondissement: Dijon
- Canton: Saint-Apollinaire

Government
  - Mayor (2020–2026): Jean-Marie Rosey
- Area^{1}: 13.43 km^{2} (5.19 sq mi)
- Elevation: 270 m (890 ft)
- Highest elevation: 289 m (948 ft)
- Lowest elevation: 209 m (686 ft)
- Population (2023): 243
  - Density: 18.1/km^{2} (46.9/sq mi)
- Time zone: UTC+01:00 (CET)
  - Summer (DST): UTC+02:00 (CEST)
- INSEE/Postal code: 21682 /21310
- ^{1} French Land Register data, which excludes lakes, ponds, glaciers > 1 km^{2} (0.386 sq mi or 247 acres) and river estuaries.

Viévigne (French pronunciation: [vjeviɲ]) is a commune in the Côte-d'Or department in eastern France.

== Population ==
Historical population
Year	Pop.	±% p.a.
1968	159	—
1975	164	+0.44%
1982	139	−2.34%
1990	171	+2.62%
1999	202	+1.87%
2007	212	+0.61%
2012	215	+0.28%
2017	259	+3.79%
2023	243	−1.06%
Source: INSEE

== See also ==
- Communes of the Côte-d'Or department
