= Fontaine-Française =

- Commune
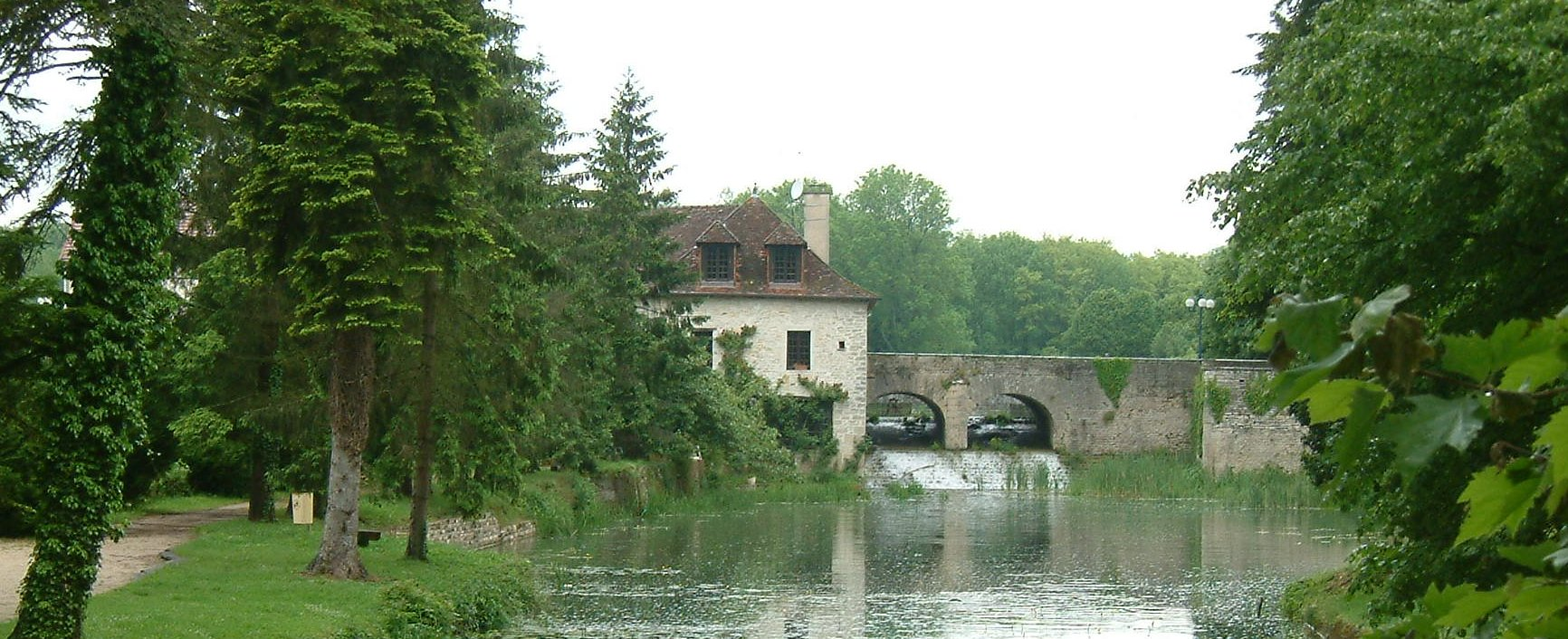
- A general view of Fontaine-Française

- Coat of arms
- Location of Fontaine-Française
- Location within France Location within Bourgogne-Franche-Comté
- Coordinates: 47°31′34″N 5°22′14″E
- Country: France
- Region: Bourgogne-Franche-Comté
- Department: Côte-d'Or
- Arrondissement: Dijon
- Canton: Saint-Apollinaire

Government
  - Mayor (2020–2026): Nicolas Urbano
- Area^{1}: 30.66 km^{2} (11.84 sq mi)
- Elevation: 230 m (750 ft)
- Highest elevation: 287 m (942 ft)
- Lowest elevation: 215 m (705 ft)
- Population (2023): 911
  - Density: 29.7/km^{2} (77.0/sq mi)
- Time zone: UTC+01:00 (CET)
  - Summer (DST): UTC+02:00 (CEST)
- INSEE/Postal code: 21277 /21610
- ^{1} French Land Register data, which excludes lakes, ponds, glaciers > 1 km^{2} (0.386 sq mi or 247 acres) and river estuaries.

Fontaine-Française (French pronunciation: [fɔ̃tɛn fʁɑ̃sɛːz]) is a commune in the Côte-d'Or department in eastern France.

== Population ==
Historical population
| Year | Pop. | ±% p.a. |
|---|---|---|
| 1968 | 658 | — |
| 1975 | 816 | +3.12% |
| 1982 | 857 | +0.70% |
| 1990 | 798 | −0.89% |
| 1999 | 916 | +1.54% |
| 2007 | 947 | +0.42% |
| 2012 | 920 | −0.58% |
| 2017 | 893 | −0.59% |
| 2023 | 911 | +0.33% |
Source: INSEE

== See also ==
- Communes of the Côte-d'Or department
