= Dampierre-et-Flée =

- Commune
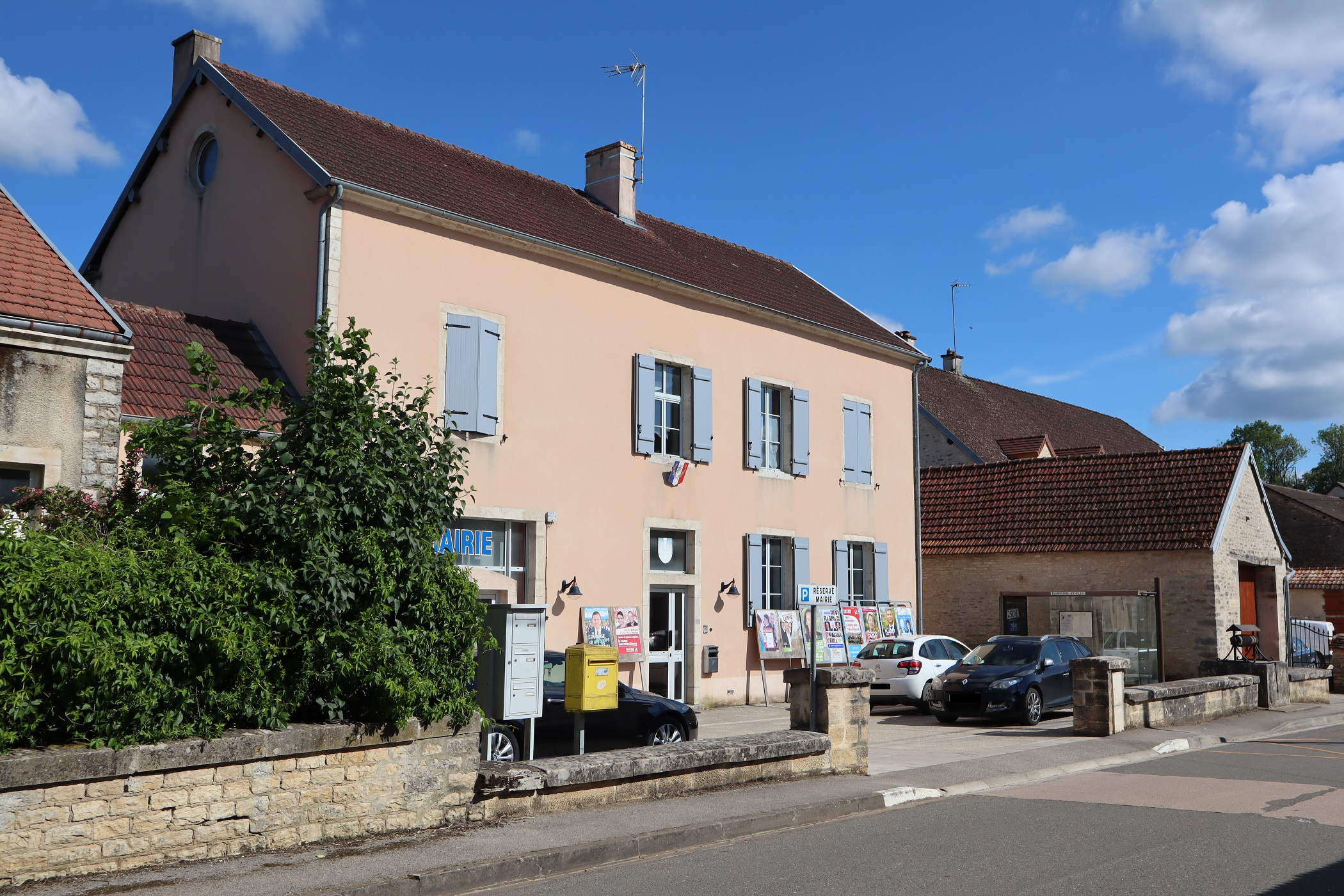
- Town hall

- Coat of arms
- Location of Dampierre-et-Flée
- Location within France Location within Bourgogne-Franche-Comté
- Coordinates: 47°28′29″N 5°22′10″E
- Country: France
- Region: Bourgogne-Franche-Comté
- Department: Côte-d'Or
- Arrondissement: Dijon
- Canton: Saint-Apollinaire

Government
  - Mayor (2020–2026): Roland Chapuis
- Area^{1}: 9.45 km^{2} (3.65 sq mi)
- Elevation: 230 m (750 ft)
- Highest elevation: 270 m (890 ft)
- Lowest elevation: 210 m (690 ft)
- Population (2023): 139
  - Density: 14.7/km^{2} (38.1/sq mi)
- Time zone: UTC+01:00 (CET)
  - Summer (DST): UTC+02:00 (CEST)
- INSEE/Postal code: 21225 /21310
- ^{1} French Land Register data, which excludes lakes, ponds, glaciers > 1 km^{2} (0.386 sq mi or 247 acres) and river estuaries.

Dampierre-et-Flée (French pronunciation: [dɑ̃pjɛʁ e fle]) is a commune in the Côte-d'Or department in eastern France.

== Population ==
Historical population
| Year | Pop. | ±% p.a. |
|---|---|---|
| 1968 | 107 | — |
| 1975 | 85 | −3.23% |
| 1982 | 94 | +1.45% |
| 1990 | 110 | +1.98% |
| 1999 | 102 | −0.84% |
| 2007 | 109 | +0.83% |
| 2012 | 142 | +5.43% |
| 2017 | 135 | −1.01% |
| 2023 | 139 | +0.49% |
Source: INSEE

== See also ==
- Communes of the Côte-d'Or department
