= Chaume-et-Courchamp =

- Commune
- Coat of arms
- Location of Chaume-et-Courchamp
- Location within France Location within Bourgogne-Franche-Comté
- Coordinates: 47°34′12″N 5°21′06″E
- Country: France
- Region: Bourgogne-Franche-Comté
- Department: Côte-d'Or
- Arrondissement: Dijon
- Canton: Saint-Apollinaire

Government
  - Mayor (2020–2026): Franck Gaillard
- Area^{1}: 8.1 km^{2} (3.1 sq mi)
- Elevation: 296 m (971 ft)
- Highest elevation: 312 m (1,024 ft)
- Lowest elevation: 239 m (784 ft)
- Population (2023): 188
  - Density: 23/km^{2} (60/sq mi)
- Time zone: UTC+01:00 (CET)
  - Summer (DST): UTC+02:00 (CEST)
- INSEE/Postal code: 21158 /21610
- ^{1} French Land Register data, which excludes lakes, ponds, glaciers > 1 km^{2} (0.386 sq mi or 247 acres) and river estuaries.

Chaume-et-Courchamp (French pronunciation: [ʃom e kuʁʃɑ̃]) is a commune in the Côte-d'Or department in eastern France.

== Population ==
Historical population
Year	Pop.	±% p.a.
1968	135	—
1975	145	+1.03%
1982	142	−0.30%
1990	131	−1.00%
1999	140	+0.74%
2007	144	+0.35%
2012	166	+2.88%
2017	180	+1.63%
2023	188	+0.73%
Source: INSEE

== See also ==
- Communes of the Côte-d'Or department
