= Fontenelle, Côte-d'Or =

Fontenelle
- Commune
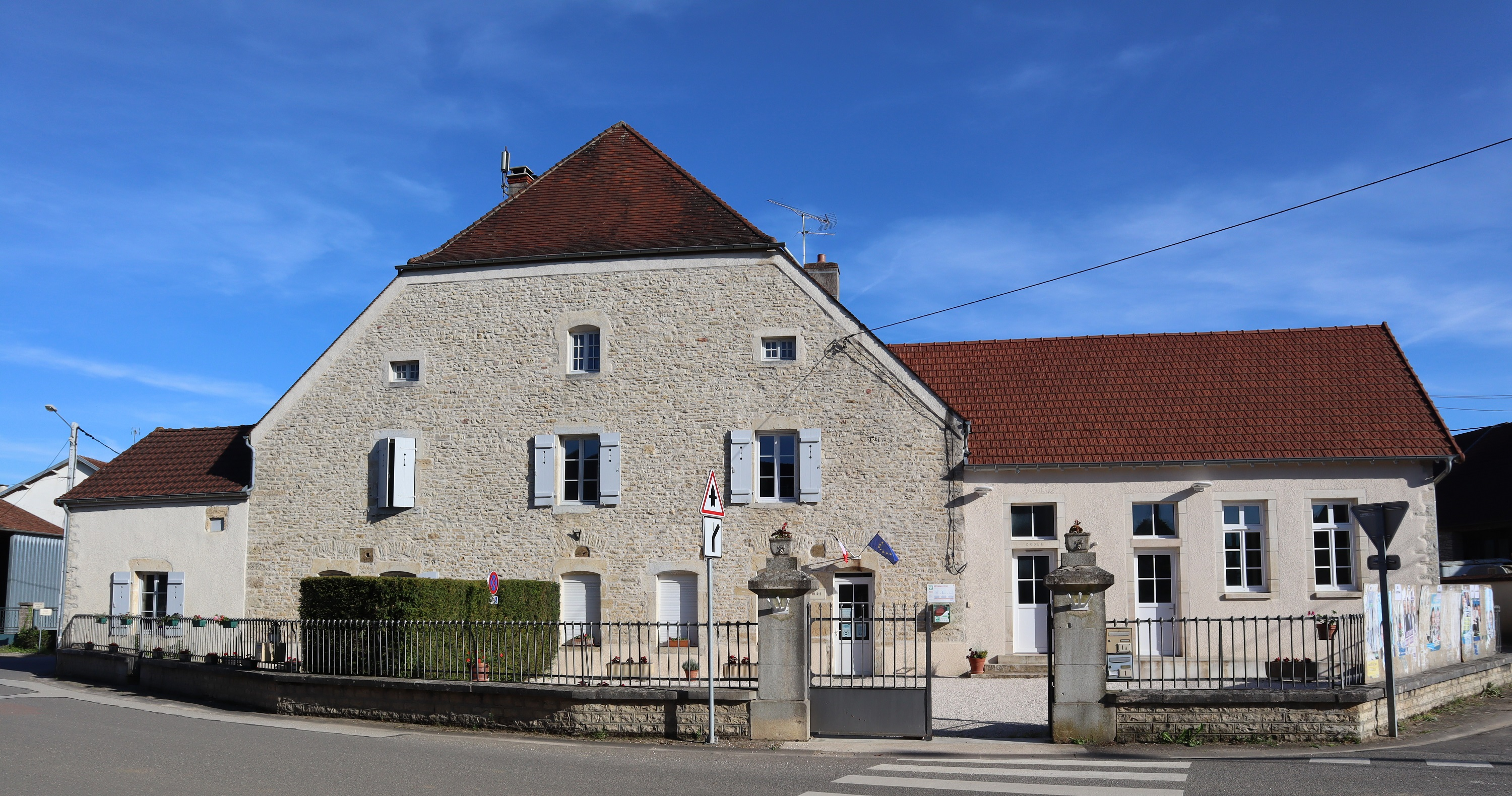
- Town hall
- Location of Fontenelle
- Location within France Location within Bourgogne-Franche-Comté
- Coordinates: 47°30′09″N 5°22′32″E
- Country: France
- Region: Bourgogne-Franche-Comté
- Department: Côte-d'Or
- Arrondissement: Dijon
- Canton: Saint-Apollinaire
- Intercommunality: Mirebellois et Fontenois

Government
  - Mayor (2020–2026): Isabelle Quirot
- Area^{1}: 10.14 km^{2} (3.92 sq mi)
- Elevation: 190 m (620 ft)
- Highest elevation: 273 m (896 ft)
- Lowest elevation: 217 m (712 ft)
- Population (2023): 169
  - Density: 16.7/km^{2} (43.2/sq mi)
- Time zone: UTC+01:00 (CET)
  - Summer (DST): UTC+02:00 (CEST)
- INSEE/Postal code: 21281 /21610
- ^{1} French Land Register data, which excludes lakes, ponds, glaciers > 1 km^{2} (0.386 sq mi or 247 acres) and river estuaries.

Fontenelle is a commune in the Côte-d'Or department in eastern France.

== Population ==
Historical population
Year	Pop.	±% p.a.
1968	147	—
1975	130	−1.74%
1982	116	−1.61%
1990	109	−0.78%
1999	104	−0.52%
2007	130	+2.83%
2012	155	+3.58%
2017	165	+1.26%
2023	169	+0.40%
Source: INSEE

== See also ==
- Communes of the Côte-d'Or department
