= Henry of Poitou =

Medieval prelate (d. 1149)

Henry of Poitou (died c. 1149) – not to be confused with Henry of Antioch (c. 1217 – c. 1276) who was also known as Henry of Poitou – thought to be the son of William VII of Poitou. Henry was an ecclesiastic, and, according to the Peterborough Chronicle, held a number of titles throughout his career. He was a sworn witness attesting to the consanguinity of William Clito and Sybilla of Anjou, which led to the annulment of their marriage in 1124 by Pope Calixtus II.

== Ecclesiastical career ==
Henry's ecclesiastical career was complex, and spanned both England and what is now France. The titles he held across his career were Bishop of Soissons from c. 1087–1092; he then joined the monastic community of Cluny, and being elevated to prior there; he was prior at Souvigny; he was abbot of Saint-Jean-d'Angély in the early twelfth century; the Archbishop of Besançon for three days; Bishop of Saintes; and was installed as the abbot of Peterborough Abbey by King Henry I of England in 1127. His appointments to the abbacies of Saint-Jean-d'Angély and of Peterborough were the result of his status as a relative of Henry I and William IX, according to the Anglo-Saxon Chronicle and to the records of the Angély cartulary. These appointments were not without controversy.

He was also a member of the party that travelled with Pope Paschal II to the abbey of Béze and at the consecration of the church of La Charite-sur-Loir, and was said to have been the papal legate to England in 1123. He was also the recipient of a papal bull, written by Calixtus II, in 1123, which directly addressed his position and expected duties as abbot of Saint-Jean-d'Angély.

== Controversies ==
=== Abbot of Saint-Jean-d'Angély ===
Henry was appointed to the abbacy of Saint-Jean-d'Angély in 1104, following the death of Abbot Ansculph. This position was given to him through the intervention of the bishop of Saintes, Rannulf, and William VIII of Poitou, and favoured Cluny. He was imposed upon the monks of Saint-Jean-d'Angély with the promise that they could return to their usual habit of free election upon Henry leaving the abbey, which he did in 1131. According to both the Angély cartulary and Orderic Vitalis, this took place following an event where William of Aquitaine's men sacked and looted the abbey, probably in response to monastic disorder, for which William was forced to undertake penance.

Henry's abbacy was also marked by discontent amongst other abbots, with Geoffrey of Vendôme writing to Henry, Rannulf, William, and Hugh of Cluny, complaining about a territorial dispute between Saint-Jean-d'Angély and Vendôme. According to the letter written to Hugh, Henry was regarded as 'a lover of discord, a sower of strife, [and] a disturber of peace'.

=== Archbishop of Besançon ===
It is thought, following the Peterborough Chronicle, that Henry was appointed to the archbishopric of Besançon. There are some issues with this identification, as there is no positive evidence of such an appointment, although, as Cecily Clark points out, there was a period in between the death of Pontius in 1108 and the election of William of Arguel in 1109, when the see of Besançon was administered by the Archbishop of Vienne, Guy (later Pope Calixtus II). As noted above, he only held this title for three days. According to the Anglo-Saxon Chronicle, Henry was appointed to the archbishopric 'through his great craft', and they noted that 'he justly lost it, because he unjustly obtained it.' This phrasing suggests that he acquired the archbishopric through simony or cunning.

In a similar vein, his appointment to the bishopric of Saintes is not well attested, although the abbot of Saint-Jean-d'Angély was known to have special protections, and to manage the see in the event of the death of a bishop, as spelled out in the aforementioned letter written by Calixtus II. In a letter written to Girard II of Angoulême in 1113, Geoffry of Vendôme implies that Girard promised Henry that he would aid in the deposition of Rainald of Chesnelli, who was the canon at Saintes at the time, and ascended to the bishopric himself. A section of the mortuary roll of Matilda of La Trinité-de-Caen records that there was indeed a bishop Rainald who was persecuted in a Cluniac plot.

=== Abbot of Peterborough ===
In 1127, Henry was appointed to the abbacy of Peterborough Abbey, against the wishes of the monks there, who wanted to install one of their own as abbot, as was the custom in the twelfth century. This appointment was made by King Henry I, who was related to the new abbot, and who wanted to reward him for his support in the annulment of the marriage of William Clito to Sybilla of Anjou due to their consanguinity. The monks of Peterborough Abbey viewed their new abbot as being extremely greedy and ambitious, as well as noting his deceitfulness towards both Henry I and to Peter the Venerable, abbot of Cluny. They also noted that he was still technically the Abbot of Saint-Jean-d'Angély, and should not hold the two abbacies at once. In this, the monks were supported by a number of bishops and archbishops, although Henry claimed that he had not only vacated Saint-Jean-d'Angély, but that he did so with the approval of the Pope.

In response to his appointment, the anonymous continuer of the Anglo-Saxon Chronicle made a number of disparaging comments, telling his reader that Henry believed that 'if he could be established in England, he could have everything he wanted.' He approached the King, the chronicle continues, saying that 'he was old and hopeless, [and] could not endure the great injustice' he was undergoing in France. The King relented, and appointed Henry over the monks of Peterborough, where, the chronicle tells us, 'he lived like a drone in a beehive: all that the bees in the hive are able to gather in, the drones devour' – in the medieval period, drones were believed to have an almost parasitical relationship to the rest of the hive.

Henry, according to the Chronicle, pillaged the monastery of its wealth and sent the bulk of it to his overseas holdings. As a result, the Chronicle relates that there soon appeared (on the 6th of February, 1127) what is now referred to as a "Wild Hunt", a motif that was commonly used by medieval writers to express supernatural displeasure with current events. As Andrew Joynes says, 'To the twelfth-century chronicler and his fellow monks, the monstrous hunters [...] would have signified the disruption of the natural order' caused by Henry's appointment. Henry returned to Poitou in 1128, and, in 1132, he was finally stripped of his rights over Peterborough, when 'finally understanding the perfidiousness of Henry of Poitou', the king removed him from the abbacy. This followed Henry attempting to subjugate the abbey to become a daughter-house of Cluny, but this failed thanks to the intervention of the English clergy. He was succeeded by Martin, formerly of Saint Neot's, which is also in Cambridgeshire.

Orderic Vitalis is one of the few other chroniclers to mention Henry of Poitou, and he does so in a less inflammatory manner, only saying that Henry had been abbot of Saint-Jean-d'Angély, and was later appointed to Peterborough, only to be expelled by the monks there. Henry is also mentioned by Hugo Candidus, although Cecily Clark has argued that this chronicle is too closely based on the Anglo-Saxon Chronicle to be considered untainted by it.

== Potential Identifications ==
The British Museum houses MS. 8873, a collection of extracts from the papal registers, which includes a document from the reign of Urban II. This document describes how a Henry of Soissons had been called to a synod by the pope, and forced to promise to refuse connections with those who have been excommunicated, and agreed to refuse to consecrate those bishops or abbots who have been appointed by the laity. While Clark states that there is no way to know that this Henry of Soissons is the Henry of Poitou, these events took place during his reign as bishop.

== Death ==
The only surviving record of Henry's death can be found in the writings of Hugo Candidus, who wrote that Henry returned to Saint-Jean-d'Angély, reclaimed his abbacy, and died there not long afterwards.
