= Geoffrey of Vendôme =

French Benedictine monk, writer and cardinal

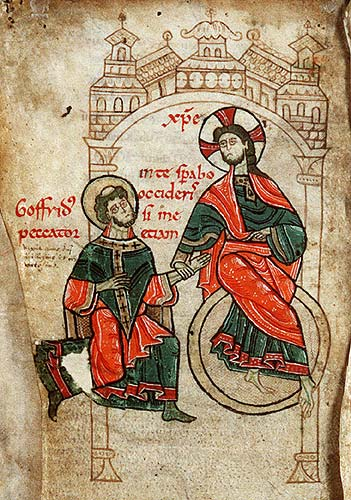
In this miniature, Geoffrey, with a nimbus, kneels before Christ, who sits on a globe.

Geoffrey of Vendôme (Goffridus Abbas Vindocinensis; c. 1065/70 – 26 March 1132) was a French Benedictine monk, writer and cardinal. He was born and died at Angers.

Born to a noble family, at an early age he entered the Benedictine community of the Blessed Trinity at Vendôme in the diocese of Chartres; and in 1093, while still very young and only a deacon, was chosen abbot of the community.

During all his lifetime he showed a great attachment to the Holy See. Thus, in 1094, he went to Rome in order to help Pope Urban II (1088–99) to take possession of the Lateran, still held by the faction of the antipope Clement III (1080–1100); the money which he offered to the custodian brought about the surrender.

In compensation he was created a cardinal-priest by Urban II, with the titular church of St. Prisca on the Aventine. No less than twelve times did he make the journey to Italy in the interest of the Church of Rome during the pontificates of Urban II, Paschal II (1099–1118), and Callistus II (1119–24); and on three occasions he was made a captive.

In 1096 and 1107 he extended the hospitality of his monastery to Popes Urban and Paschal. He took part in the councils held at Clermont in 1095, by Pope Urban; at Saintes, in 1096, by the Apostolic Legate Amatus of Bordeaux; and at Reims, in 1131, by Innocent II (1130–43).

He also strenuously defended the ecclesiastical principles in the question of investitures, which he qualified in several small tracts as heresy and simony; he wrote in the same spirit to Pope Paschal II when the latter made concessions (1111) to Emperor Henry V (1106–25). Finally, he always defended firmly the prerogatives, the rights, and the property of his abbey at Vendôme against the encroachments of either bishops or secular princes, such as in letter written prior to 1107, where Geoffrey complained to Rannulf of Saintes, William of Poitou, and Hugh of Cluny about the actions of Henry of Poitou.

Geoffrey was one of the distinguished men of his age, and was in correspondence with many eminent personalities of that time. His writings consist of a number of letters; of a series of tracts on the investitures of ecclesiastics by laymen, on the Sacraments of the Holy Eucharist, Baptism, Confirmation, and Extreme Unction, on ascetic and pastoral subjects; hymns to the Blessed Virgin and St. Mary Magdalene; sermons on the feasts of Our Lord, the Blessed Virgin, Mary Magdalene, and St. Benedict.
