= Prudent de Narbonne =

Christian deacon and martyr (died c. 257)

- Died: c. 257; Narbonne, France
- Other names: Prudentius
- Occupation: Deacon
- Known for: Martyrdom, Miraculous relics

Prudent de Narbonne (Latin: Prudentius, died c. 257) was a Christian deacon who was martyred in Narbonne in what is now France in the 3rd century. He is venerated by the Catholic Church as a saint. His relics are said to have effected various miracles. They were found in a church in Narbonne and taken to Bèze Abbey in 883. They were held for safe keeping during the Norman invasions in the cathedral of Saint-Étienne de Dijon, then returned to the abbey. Later they were restored to Narbonne, and are held in an elaborate reliquary in Narbonne Cathedral.

== Life ==
Prudentius was a deacon who was martyred in Narbonne in the 3rd century. He came from a noble family of Narbonne and was raised as a Christian. He studied literature with great success, and was made a deacon. He may have been a victim of the persecution of Valerian in 257. (Note: Valerian (263–260) had launched an attack on Christians by his edicts of 257 and 258. The martyrdom of Saint Prudent at Narbonne is taken to have occurred in 257. Martyred saints in 258 included the particularly holy Pope Sixtus II (6 August), Saint Romanus Ostiarius (9 August) and Saint Lawrence (10 August). Other saints martyred in 258 included the Saints Denis in Paris, Pontius in Cimiez, Cyprian in Carthage and Eugenia in Rome. In 259 Saint Patroclus was martyred at Troyes and Saint Fructuosus at Tarragona.) A 19th-century biographer writes that he shone in the assembly of the faithful like the sun at noon by the brilliancy of his teaching and the sanctity of his life, which was shown by many miracles. This caused some people to hate him. They loaded him with chains, cruelly tortured him and broke his skull with a mason's hammer on 7 September 257. It is not recorded whether his murderers were barbarians or Roman soldiers.

== Relics ==
Locations in France

H.M. Duplus in his Vie des Saints du diocèse de Dijon (1866) relates that the Christians buried Prudentius in a sepulcher, but his enemies pulled the body out and exposed it to be devoured by the birds of prey and scavenging animals. However, God removed the animals and the Christians reburied the saint secretly. Later they put the holy relics in a tomb and raised a small church above it. This church was burned by the Saracens in the 8th century and its revenues given by Charles Martel (c. 686–741) to one of his soldiers.

On 6 October 883 Geilon, bishop of Langres, gave Bèze Abbey the relics of Saint Prudent, which he had brought back after his pilgrimage to Santiago de Compostela in northwestern Spain. Geilon was bishop of Langres from 880 to 887. He stole the body during the extraordinary conditions in Aquitaine at the time. He had found it in a church in Narbonne, where the saint was little respected. Geilon also brought back an arm of the apostle Saint James and many other sacred relics, some of which he deposited in his cathedral and some at Bèze.

When marauding Normans approached in 887 the monks of Bèze transported the body of Saint Prudent to the cathedral of Saint-Étienne de Dijon. The Chronicle of Bèze, edited by a monk named Jean in the 12th century, describes the flight of the monks from the Normans with Saint Prudent's relics to the cathedral in the fortified town of Dijon. The chronicle records that other relics were also deposited in Dijon for several years, including those of Saint Medardus of Soissons and Saint Silvin. After peace was restored the body of Saint Prudent, now accompanied by those of Saint Silvin and Anglia, his intimate, was returned to Bèze on 23 September 921 by Bishop Guarnerius.

The Acts of St. Prudent, written by the monk Thibaud in the 12th century, gives a more elaborate story. Under the protection of Richard, Duke of Burgundy, the bodies of several saints were found in Dijon, including that of Prudent, which remained there for thirty years. The monks rebuilt the ruins of the abbey and asked for the saint's body from Dijon. The canons of Dijon at first refused, then at the command of Bishop Gauthier (Guarnerius) of Langres pretended to comply, but in fact gave the monks the body of Saint Silvin. The canons wanted to keep the body of Prudent due to its ability to perform miracles, whereas the relics of Saint Silvin were much less effective. A few days later Prudent himself appeared to the bishop and made a long speech in which he denounced the hoax. The ruse was discovered, and the body of Saint Prudent was carried with great ceremony from Dijon to Bèze in 931.

Saint Prudent de Narbonne's worship was important to Bèze in the 10th, 11th and 12th centuries. On 8 June 1116 the body of Saint Prudent was taken to the great debate between Lux and Til-Châtel arranged by Jocerand^{(fr)}, Bishop of Langres under the presidency of Guy of Burgundy, Archbishop of Vienne, who was later pope under the name of Callixtus II, to put an end to the quarrels, lawsuits and other evils from which the province was suffering. Prudent's body was placed under a temple of greenery with several other saints, and performed great miracles. In 1675 parcels of the relics of Saint Prudent were given to the church of Châtillon-sur-Seine. In 1686 they were given to the city of Narbonne.

== Reliquary ==
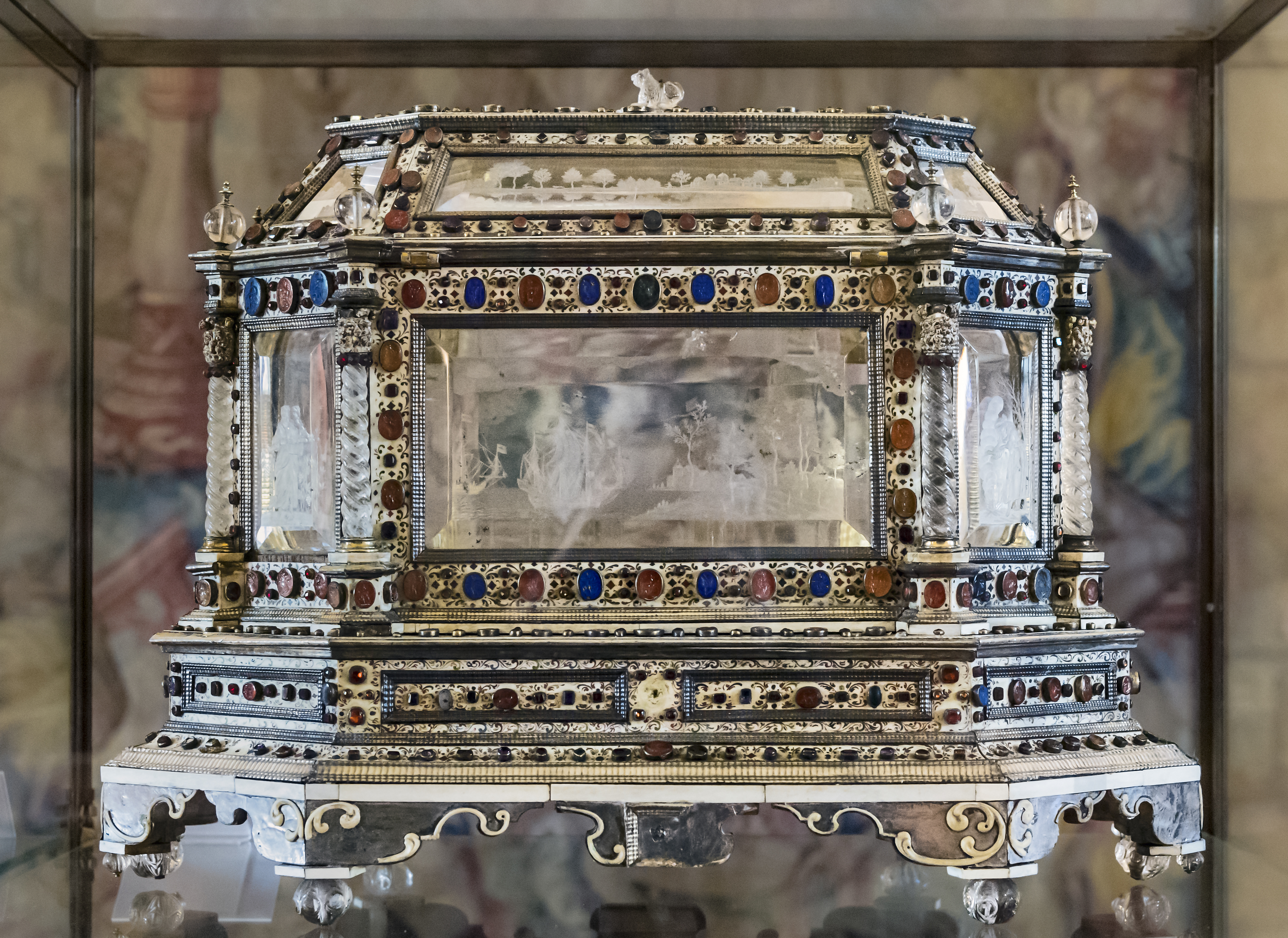
Reliquary casket of Saint Prudent in the Cathédrale Saint-Just de Narbonne

The relics of the saint are held today in Narbonne Cathedral. The reliquary is an octagonal case made of engraved crystal, embossed silver, painted ivory and many garnets and intaglios, mostly antique. This type of case was given to a bride as a place to keep her jewelry. The base rests on ten crystal balls. The angles are in the form of small columns. There is a small drawer in the upper level. The engravings on the crystal plates on the sides and on the lid are finely executed and depict sea scenes, the four seasons, Faith, Justice and a landscape.

Mansart de Sagonne, an inspector of the Monuments historiques, states that the box is of Italian origin and belonged to Marie de' Medici. This seems to be incorrect. It would have originally belonged to a member of the family of Noël-François-Marie d'Auderic de Lastours, grand archdeacon of the cathedral during the time of Bishop Arthur Richard Dillon. It would have then been bequeathed to the Église Saint-Sébastien in Narbonne, and the archdeacon would have deposited the relics of Saint Prudent in the box. During the French Revolution the reliquary was taken by the archdeacon to the Ricardelle family estate, where it remained hidden with the other relics of the cathedral until the restoral of the church. It was then taken back to Narbonne Cathedral by the sister of the archdeacon, who had died.

== Memories ==
The saint's day is 6 October. The monk Teobaudus (died 1130) wrote the Miracula Sancti Prudentii, which described the miraculous cures that had been effected by the relics of Saint Prudent. Prudent de Narbonne is mentioned in the prayer to Notre-Dame du Pont de Narbonne, diocese of Carcassonne. There is a stone statue of Prudent in Malange, near Dole, Jura, from the 15th century.

== Sources ==
- Baudoin, Jacques (2006), "Saint Prudent", Grand livre des saints: culte et iconographie en Occident (in French), EDITIONS CREER, ISBN 978-2-84819-041-9
- Brasart, Jérôme (24 February 2014), "Bèze (Abbaye Saint-Pierre)", www.mauristes.org (in French)
- Duplus, H. M. (1866), Vie des Saints du diocèse de Dijon (in French), Gagey
- Marillier, J.; Velard, Roland (1958), "Bèze – son histoire, son site, sa grotte", Sous le Plancher – Bulletin du S.C. Dijon (in French) (2): 35–40
- Mériaux, Charles (2006), Gallia irradiata (in French), Franz Steiner Verlag, ISBN 978-3-515-08353-9
- "Monuments historiques PM11001142", Base Palissy (in French), Ministry of Culture
- "Saint Prudent de Narbonne", Nominis (in French)
