= Bourberain =

- Commune
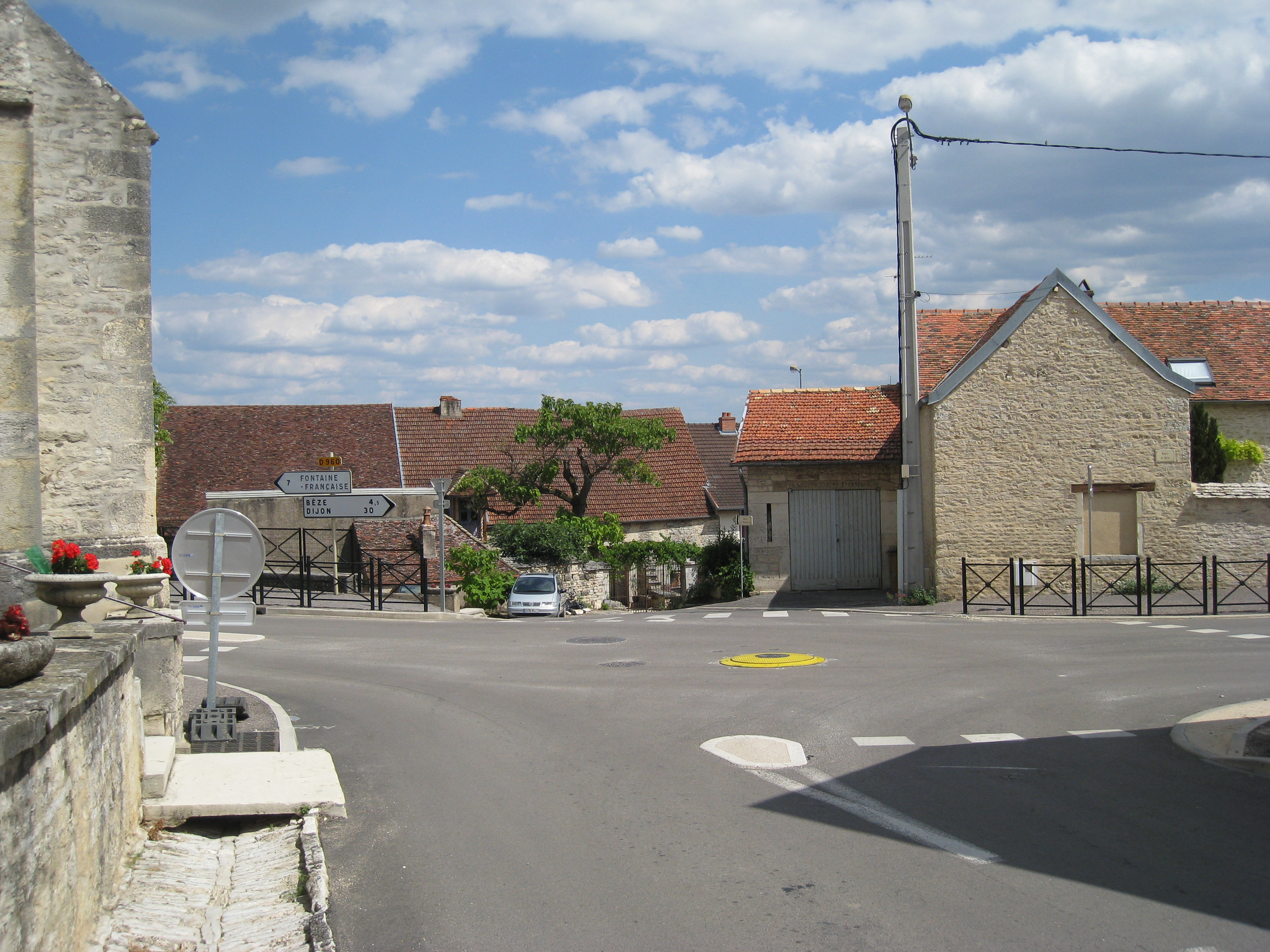
- A view within Bourberain
- Location of Bourberain
- Location within France Location within Bourgogne-Franche-Comté
- Coordinates: 47°30′04″N 5°17′49″E
- Country: France
- Region: Bourgogne-Franche-Comté
- Department: Côte-d'Or
- Arrondissement: Dijon
- Canton: Saint-Apollinaire

Government
  - Mayor (2020–2026): Cyril Bellant
- Area^{1}: 30.71 km^{2} (11.86 sq mi)
- Elevation: 270 m (890 ft)
- Highest elevation: 305 m (1,001 ft)
- Lowest elevation: 223 m (732 ft)
- Population (2023): 382
  - Density: 12.4/km^{2} (32.2/sq mi)
- Time zone: UTC+01:00 (CET)
  - Summer (DST): UTC+02:00 (CEST)
- INSEE/Postal code: 21094 /21610
- ^{1} French Land Register data, which excludes lakes, ponds, glaciers > 1 km^{2} (0.386 sq mi or 247 acres) and river estuaries.

Bourberain (French pronunciation: [buʁbəʁɛ̃]) is a commune situated in the Côte-d'Or department in eastern France.

== Population ==
Historical population
Year	Pop.	±% p.a.
1968	251	—
1975	245	−0.35%
1982	231	−0.84%
1990	289	+2.84%
1999	278	−0.43%
2007	316	+1.61%
2012	360	+2.64%
2017	394	+1.82%
2023	382	−0.51%
Source: INSEE

== See also ==
- Communes of the Côte-d'Or department
