= Varois-et-Chaignot =

- Commune
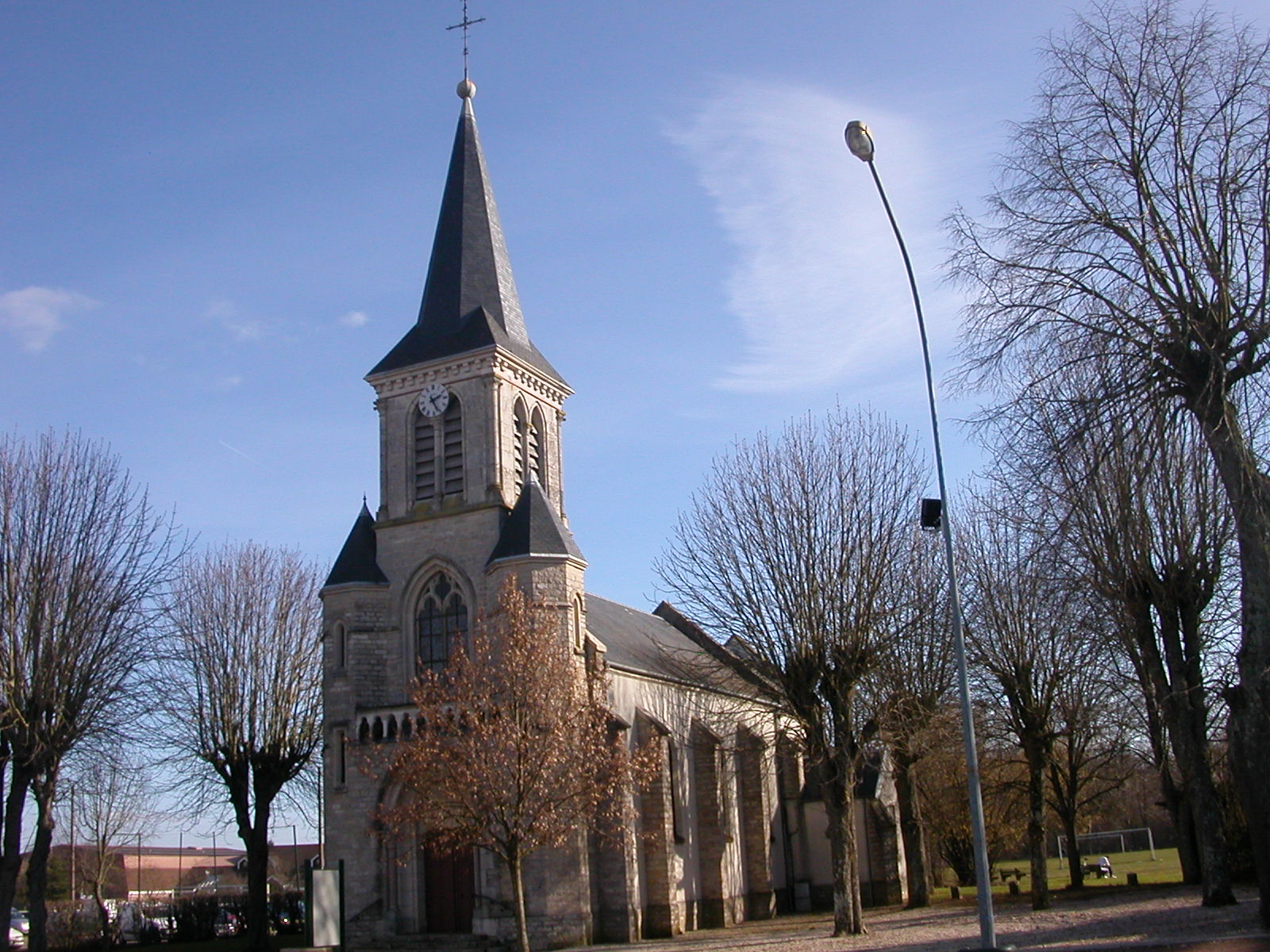
- The church in Varois-et-Chaignot

- Coat of arms
- Location of Varois-et-Chaignot
- Location within France Location within Bourgogne-Franche-Comté
- Coordinates: 47°21′05″N 5°07′53″E
- Country: France
- Region: Bourgogne-Franche-Comté
- Department: Côte-d'Or
- Arrondissement: Dijon
- Canton: Saint-Apollinaire

Government
  - Mayor (2020–2026): Pierre Jobard
- Area^{1}: 10.10 km^{2} (3.90 sq mi)
- Highest elevation: 240 m (790 ft)
- Lowest elevation: 214 m (702 ft)
- Population (2023): 2,094
  - Density: 207.3/km^{2} (537.0/sq mi)
- Time zone: UTC+01:00 (CET)
  - Summer (DST): UTC+02:00 (CEST)
- INSEE/Postal code: 21657 /21490
- ^{1} French Land Register data, which excludes lakes, ponds, glaciers > 1 km^{2} (0.386 sq mi or 247 acres) and river estuaries.

Varois-et-Chaignot (French pronunciation: [vaʁwa e ʃɛɲo]) is a commune in the Côte-d'Or department in eastern France.

== Population ==
Historical population
Year	Pop.	±% p.a.
1968	390	—
1975	1,036	+14.98%
1982	1,369	+4.06%
1990	1,717	+2.87%
1999	1,960	+1.48%
2007	1,982	+0.14%
2012	2,007	+0.25%
2017	1,913	−0.95%
2023	2,094	+1.52%
Source: INSEE

== See also ==
- Communes of the Côte-d'Or department
