= Magny-Saint-Médard =

- Commune
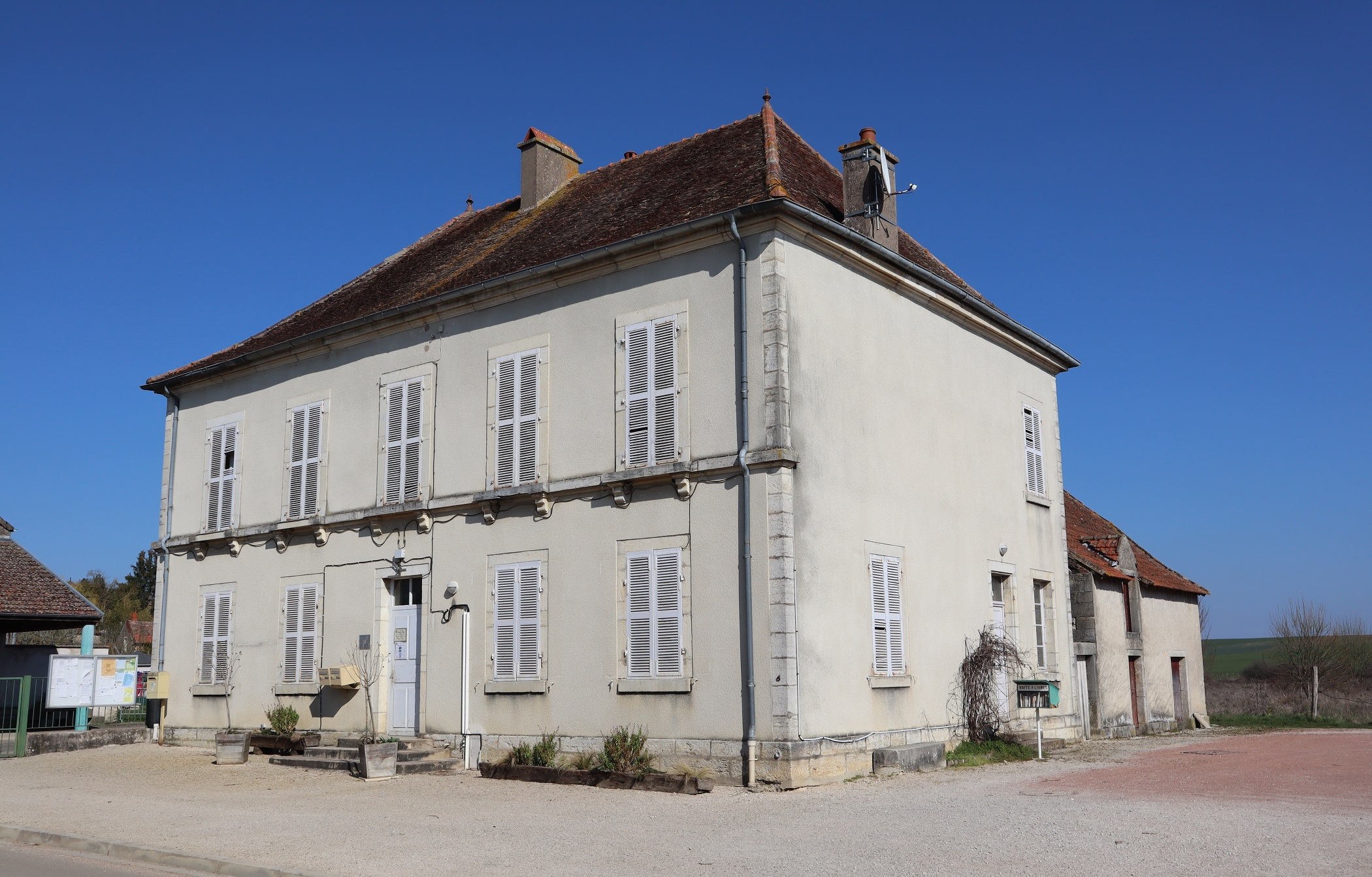
- Town hall
- Location of Magny-Saint-Médard
- Location within France Location within Bourgogne-Franche-Comté
- Coordinates: 47°22′53″N 5°15′13″E
- Country: France
- Region: Bourgogne-Franche-Comté
- Department: Côte-d'Or
- Arrondissement: Dijon
- Canton: Saint-Apollinaire
- Intercommunality: Mirebellois et Fontenois

Government
  - Mayor (2020–2026): François Bolot
- Area^{1}: 10.87 km^{2} (4.20 sq mi)
- Elevation: 213 m (699 ft)
- Highest elevation: 266 m (873 ft)
- Lowest elevation: 202 m (663 ft)
- Population (2023): 346
  - Density: 31.8/km^{2} (82.4/sq mi)
- Time zone: UTC+01:00 (CET)
  - Summer (DST): UTC+02:00 (CEST)
- INSEE/Postal code: 21369 /21310
- ^{1} French Land Register data, which excludes lakes, ponds, glaciers > 1 km^{2} (0.386 sq mi or 247 acres) and river estuaries.

Magny-Saint-Médard (French pronunciation: [maɲi sɛ̃ medaʁ]) is a commune in the Côte-d'Or department in eastern France.

== Population ==
Historical population
Year	Pop.	±% p.a.
1968	224	—
1975	240	+0.99%
1982	217	−1.43%
1990	209	−0.47%
1999	224	+0.77%
2007	234	+0.55%
2012	274	+3.21%
2017	311	+2.57%
2023	346	+1.79%
Source: INSEE

== See also ==
- Communes of the Côte-d'Or department
