= Canton of Saint-Apollinaire =

Coordinates: 47.34°N 5.09°E

The canton of Saint-Apollinaire is an administrative division of the Côte-d'Or department, eastern France. It was created at the French canton reorganisation which came into effect in March 2015. Its seat is in Saint-Apollinaire.

It consists of the following communes:

1. Arceau
2. Arc-sur-Tille
3. Beaumont-sur-Vingeanne
4. Beire-le-Châtel
5. Belleneuve
6. Bèze
7. Bézouotte
8. Blagny-sur-Vingeanne
9. Bourberain
10. Champagne-sur-Vingeanne
11. Charmes
12. Chaume-et-Courchamp
13. Cheuge
14. Couternon
15. Cuiserey
16. Dampierre-et-Flée
17. Fontaine-Française
18. Fontenelle
19. Jancigny
20. Licey-sur-Vingeanne
21. Magny-Saint-Médard
22. Mirebeau-sur-Bèze
23. Montigny-Mornay-Villeneuve-sur-Vingeanne
24. Noiron-sur-Bèze
25. Oisilly
26. Orain
27. Pouilly-sur-Vingeanne
28. Remilly-sur-Tille
29. Renève
30. Saint-Apollinaire
31. Saint-Maurice-sur-Vingeanne
32. Saint-Seine-sur-Vingeanne
33. Savolles
34. Tanay
35. Trochères
36. Varois-et-Chaignot
37. Viévigne
