= Charmes, Côte-d'Or =

Charmes
- Commune
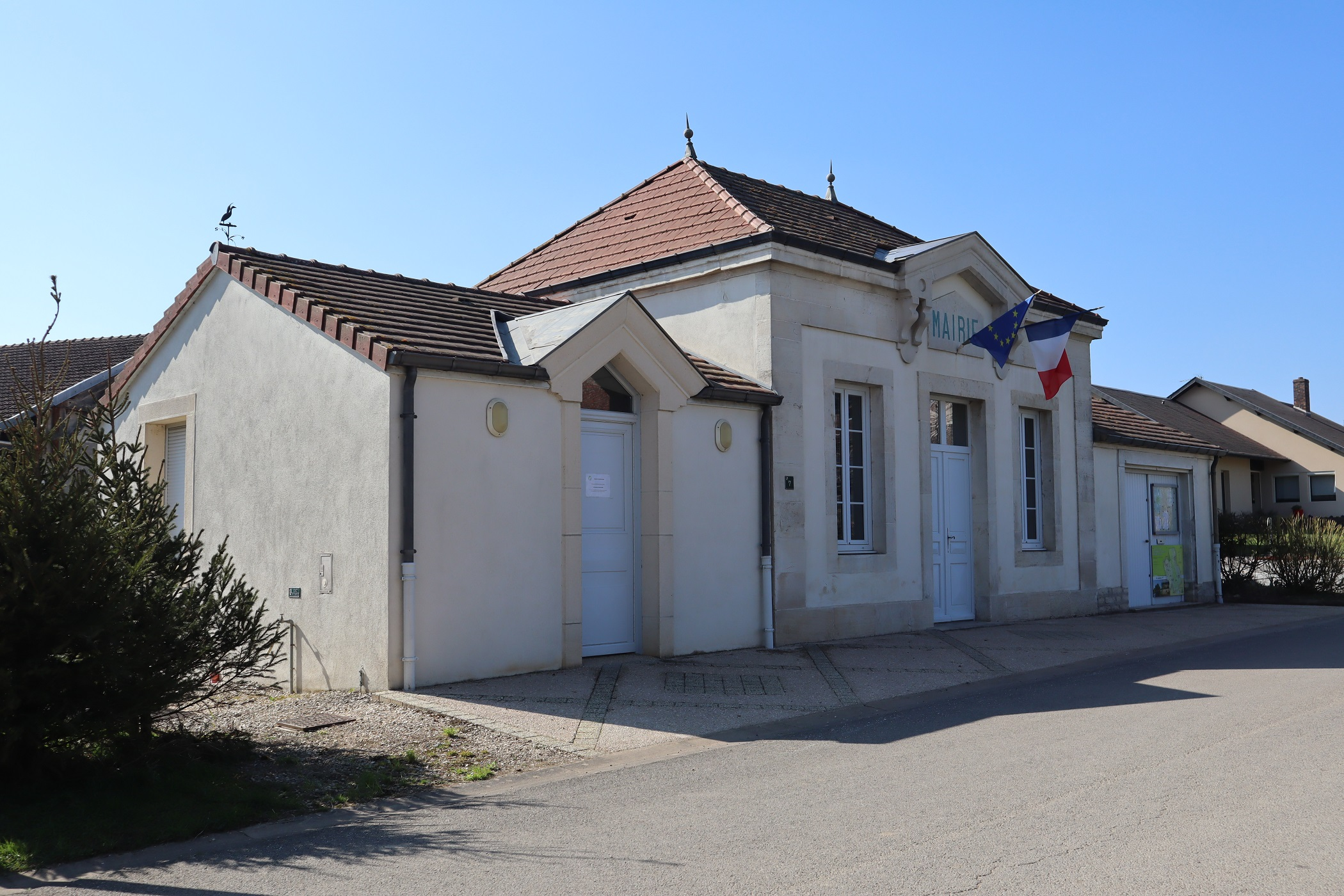
- Town hall

- Coat of arms
- Location of Charmes
- Location within France Location within Bourgogne-Franche-Comté
- Coordinates: 47°22′38″N 5°20′50″E
- Country: France
- Region: Bourgogne-Franche-Comté
- Department: Côte-d'Or
- Arrondissement: Dijon
- Canton: Saint-Apollinaire

Government
  - Mayor (2020–2026): Didier Lenoir
- Area^{1}: 6.53 km^{2} (2.52 sq mi)
- Elevation: 220 m (720 ft)
- Highest elevation: 232 m (761 ft)
- Lowest elevation: 190 m (620 ft)
- Population (2023): 122
  - Density: 18.7/km^{2} (48.4/sq mi)
- Time zone: UTC+01:00 (CET)
  - Summer (DST): UTC+02:00 (CEST)
- INSEE/Postal code: 21146 /21310
- ^{1} French Land Register data, which excludes lakes, ponds, glaciers > 1 km^{2} (0.386 sq mi or 247 acres) and river estuaries.

Charmes (French pronunciation: [ʃaʁm]) is a commune in the Côte-d'Or department in eastern France.

== Population ==
Historical population
Year	Pop.	±% p.a.
1968	85	—
1975	70	−2.74%
1982	89	+3.49%
1990	108	+2.45%
1999	108	+0.00%
2007	123	+1.64%
2012	129	+0.96%
2017	135	+0.91%
2023	122	−1.67%
Source: INSEE

== See also ==
- Communes of the Côte-d'Or department
