= Bèze =

- Commune
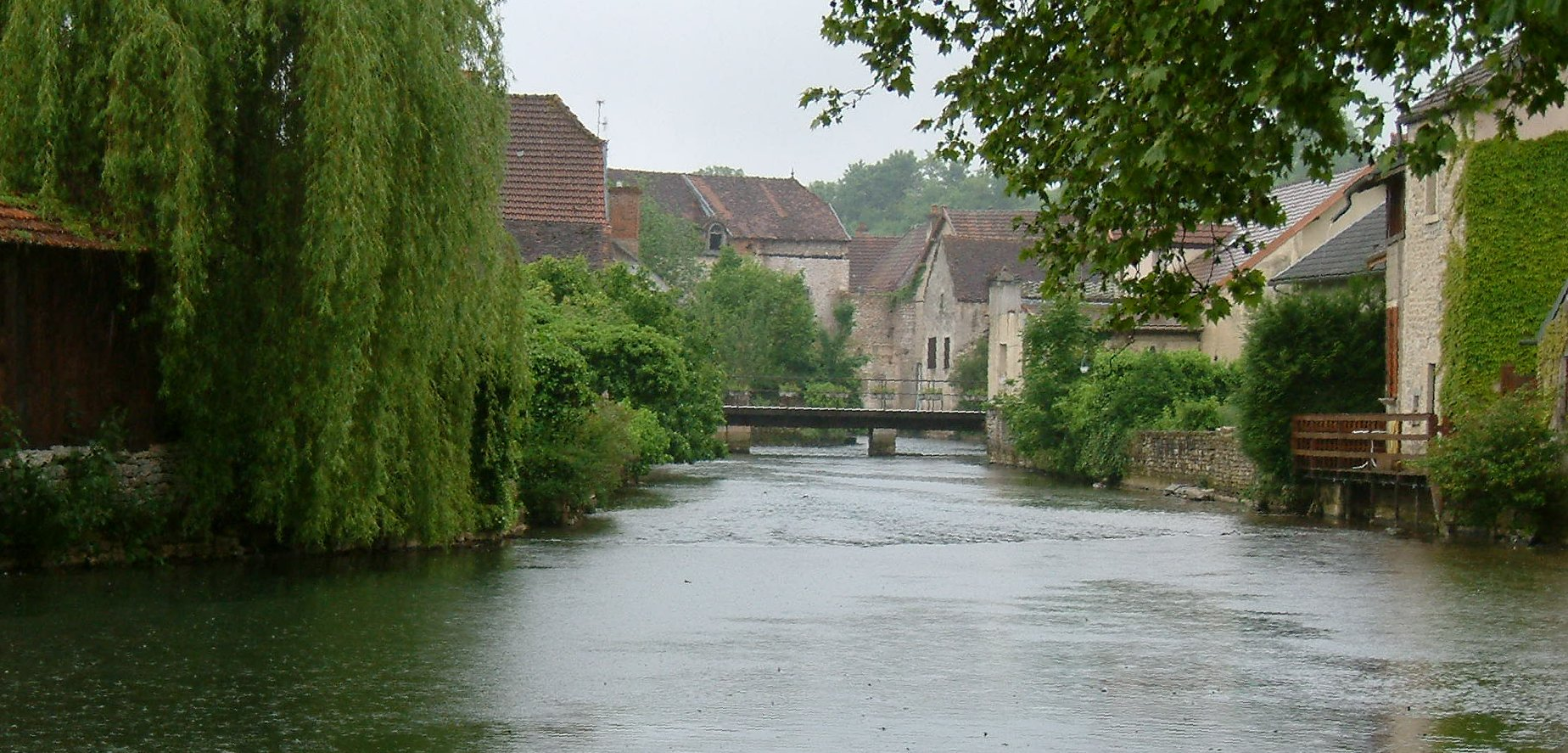
- The village and the Bèze river

- Coat of arms
- Location of Bèze
- Location within France Location within Bourgogne-Franche-Comté
- Coordinates: 47°28′00″N 5°16′00″E
- Country: France
- Region: Bourgogne-Franche-Comté
- Department: Côte-d'Or
- Arrondissement: Dijon
- Canton: Saint-Apollinaire
- Intercommunality: Mirebellois et Fontenois

Government
  - Mayor (2020–2026): Hervé Le Gouz de Saint-Seine
- Area^{1}: 23.4 km^{2} (9.0 sq mi)
- Elevation: 214 m (702 ft)
- Highest elevation: 305 m (1,001 ft)
- Lowest elevation: 201 m (659 ft)
- Population (2023): 739
  - Density: 31.6/km^{2} (81.8/sq mi)
- Time zone: UTC+01:00 (CET)
  - Summer (DST): UTC+02:00 (CEST)
- INSEE/Postal code: 21071 /21310
- ^{1} French Land Register data, which excludes lakes, ponds, glaciers > 1 km^{2} (0.386 sq mi or 247 acres) and river estuaries.

Bèze (French pronunciation: [bɛz]) is a commune in the Côte-d'Or department in eastern France.

It takes its name from the Bèze river, which rises in the commune.

== Population ==
Historical population
| Year | Pop. | ±% p.a. |
|---|---|---|
| 1968 | 495 | — |
| 1975 | 484 | −0.32% |
| 1982 | 526 | +1.20% |
| 1990 | 569 | +0.99% |
| 1999 | 632 | +1.17% |
| 2007 | 714 | +1.54% |
| 2012 | 725 | +0.31% |
| 2017 | 714 | −0.31% |
| 2023 | 739 | +0.58% |
Source: INSEE

== See also ==
- Communes of the Côte-d'Or department
