= Bézouotte =

- Commune
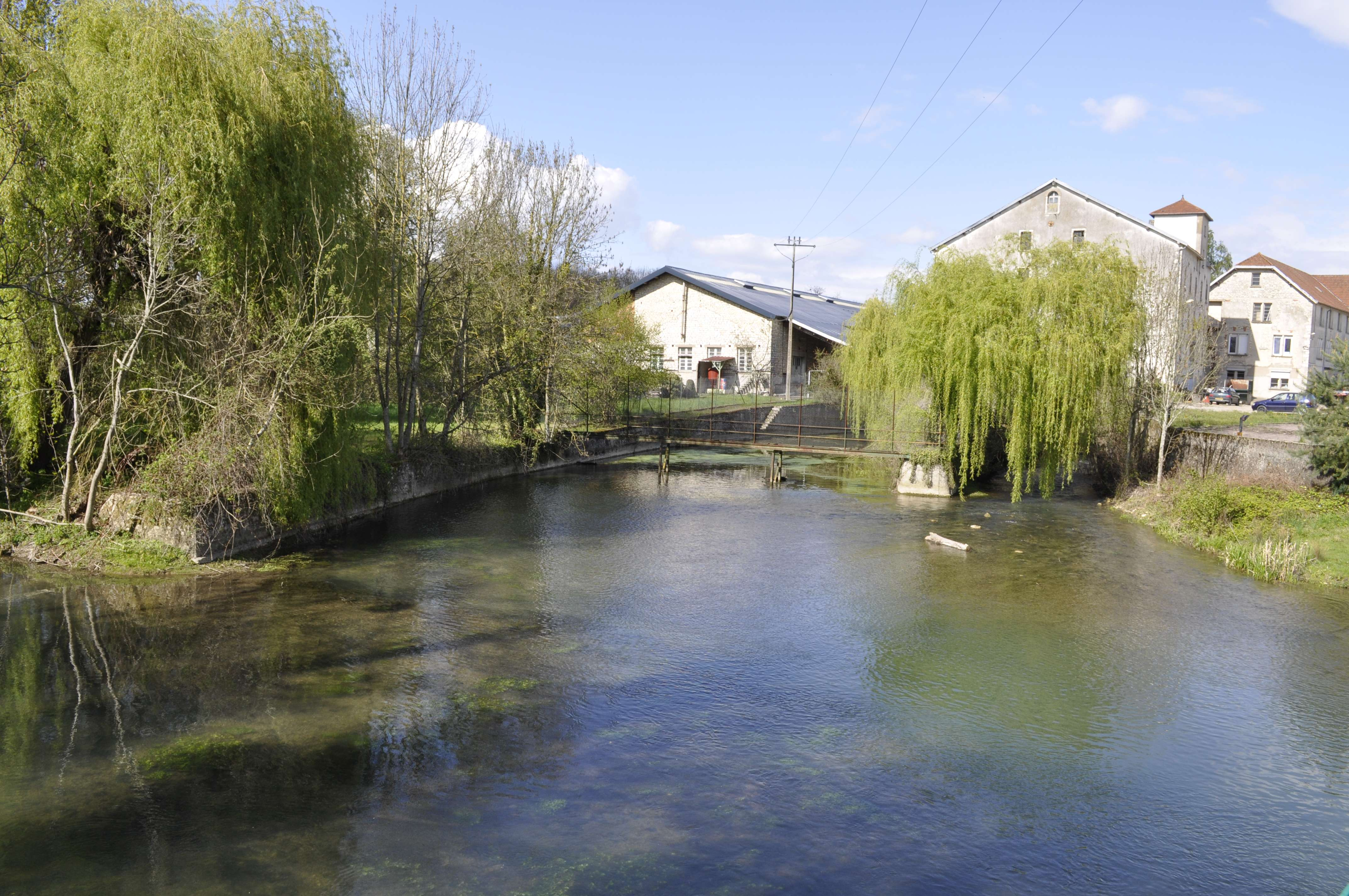
- The river Bèze
- Location of Bézouotte
- Location within France Location within Bourgogne-Franche-Comté
- Coordinates: 47°23′01″N 5°19′59″E
- Country: France
- Region: Bourgogne-Franche-Comté
- Department: Côte-d'Or
- Arrondissement: Dijon
- Canton: Saint-Apollinaire

Government
  - Mayor (2023–2026): Pascal Theron
- Area^{1}: 1.1 km^{2} (0.42 sq mi)
- Elevation: 219 m (719 ft)
- Highest elevation: 226 m (741 ft)
- Lowest elevation: 193 m (633 ft)
- Population (2023): 209
  - Density: 190/km^{2} (490/sq mi)
- Time zone: UTC+01:00 (CET)
  - Summer (DST): UTC+02:00 (CEST)
- INSEE/Postal code: 21072 /21310
- ^{1} French Land Register data, which excludes lakes, ponds, glaciers > 1 km^{2} (0.386 sq mi or 247 acres) and river estuaries.

Bézouotte (French pronunciation: [bezwɔt]) is a commune in the Côte-d'Or department in eastern France.

== Population ==
Historical population
Year	Pop.	±% p.a.
1968	194	—
1975	145	−4.07%
1982	222	+6.27%
1990	216	−0.34%
1999	214	−0.10%
2007	202	−0.72%
2012	206	+0.39%
2017	202	−0.39%
2023	209	+0.57%
Source: INSEE

== See also ==
- Communes of the Côte-d'Or department
