= Vingeanne =

River in France

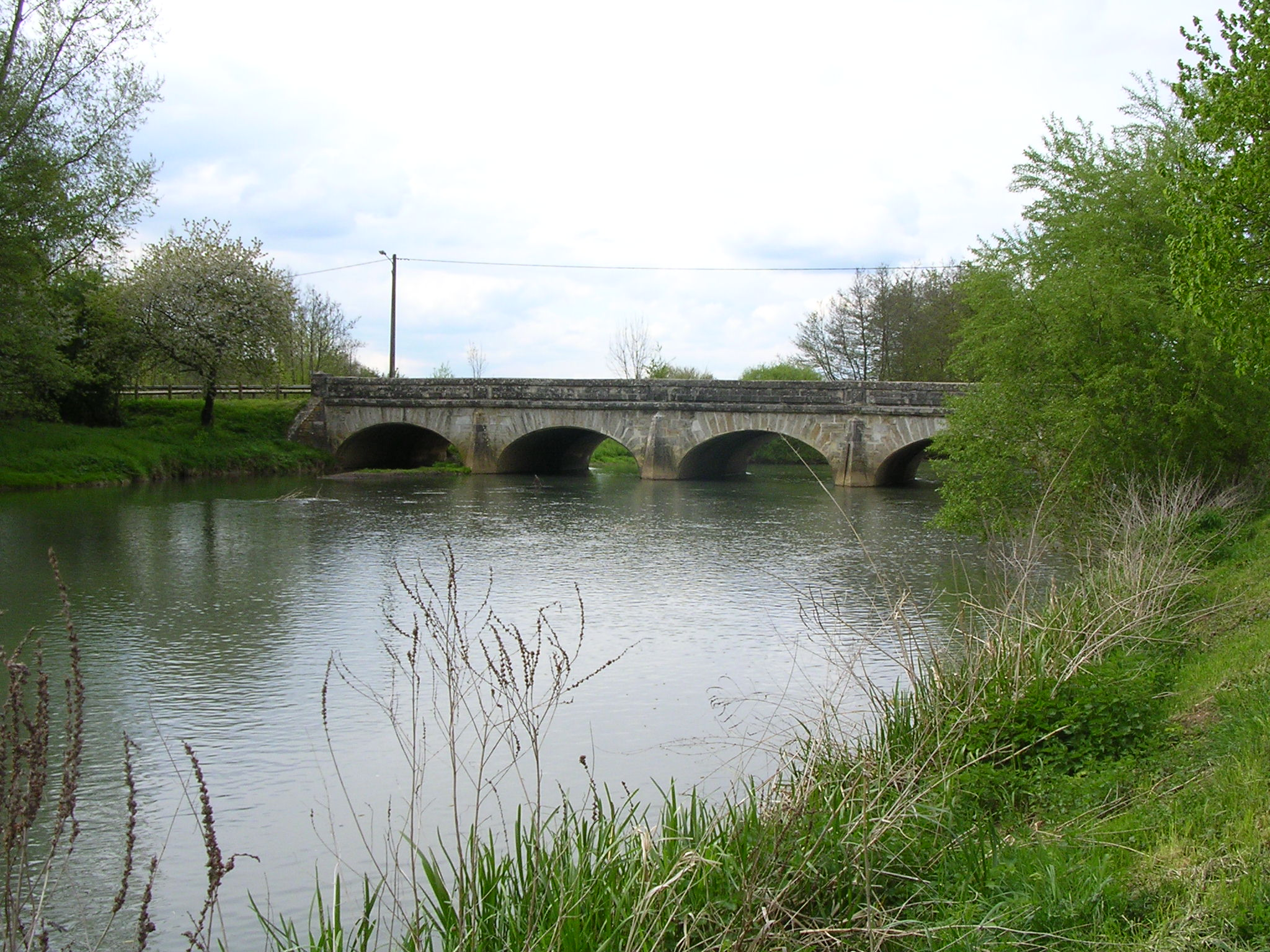
- The Vingeanne at Renève, Côte-d'Or

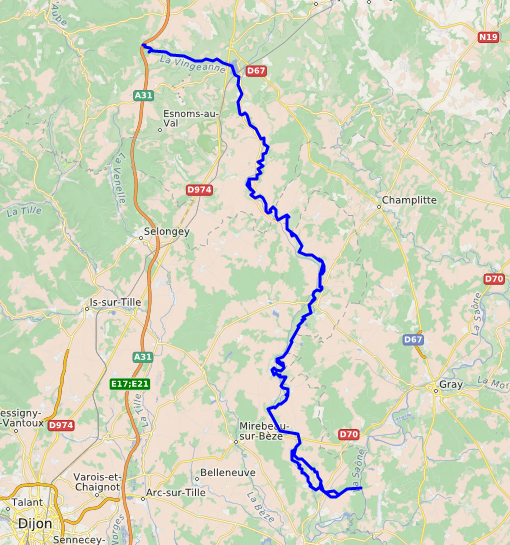
- Course of the Vingeanne

Location
- Country: France
- Departments: Côte-d'Or; Haute-Marne; Haute-Saône

Physical characteristics
- Source: Mont Moyen
  - location: Aprey
  - coordinates: 47.7553°N 5.2221°E
  - elevation: 410 metres (1,350 ft)
- Mouth: Saône
  - location: Talmay / Heuilley-sur-Saône
  - coordinates: 47.355938°N 5.488144°E
  - elevation: 185 metres (607 ft)
- Length: 93 kilometres (58 mi)
- Basin size: 650 square kilometres (250 sq mi)
- Discharge
  - location: Oisilly
  - average: 6.03 metres per second (19.8 ft/s)

Basin features
- Progression: Saône→ Rhône→ Mediterranean Sea

The Vingeanne (French pronunciation: [vɛ̃ʒan]) is a river in France, a right tributary of the Saône, which in turn is a tributary of the Rhône. It was the scene of an important battle during the Gallic Wars. The river supplies water to the Canal entre Champagne et Bourgogne, a navigable waterway that connects the Marne and the Saône, and thus links Paris to the Mediterranean.

== Description ==
=== Course ===
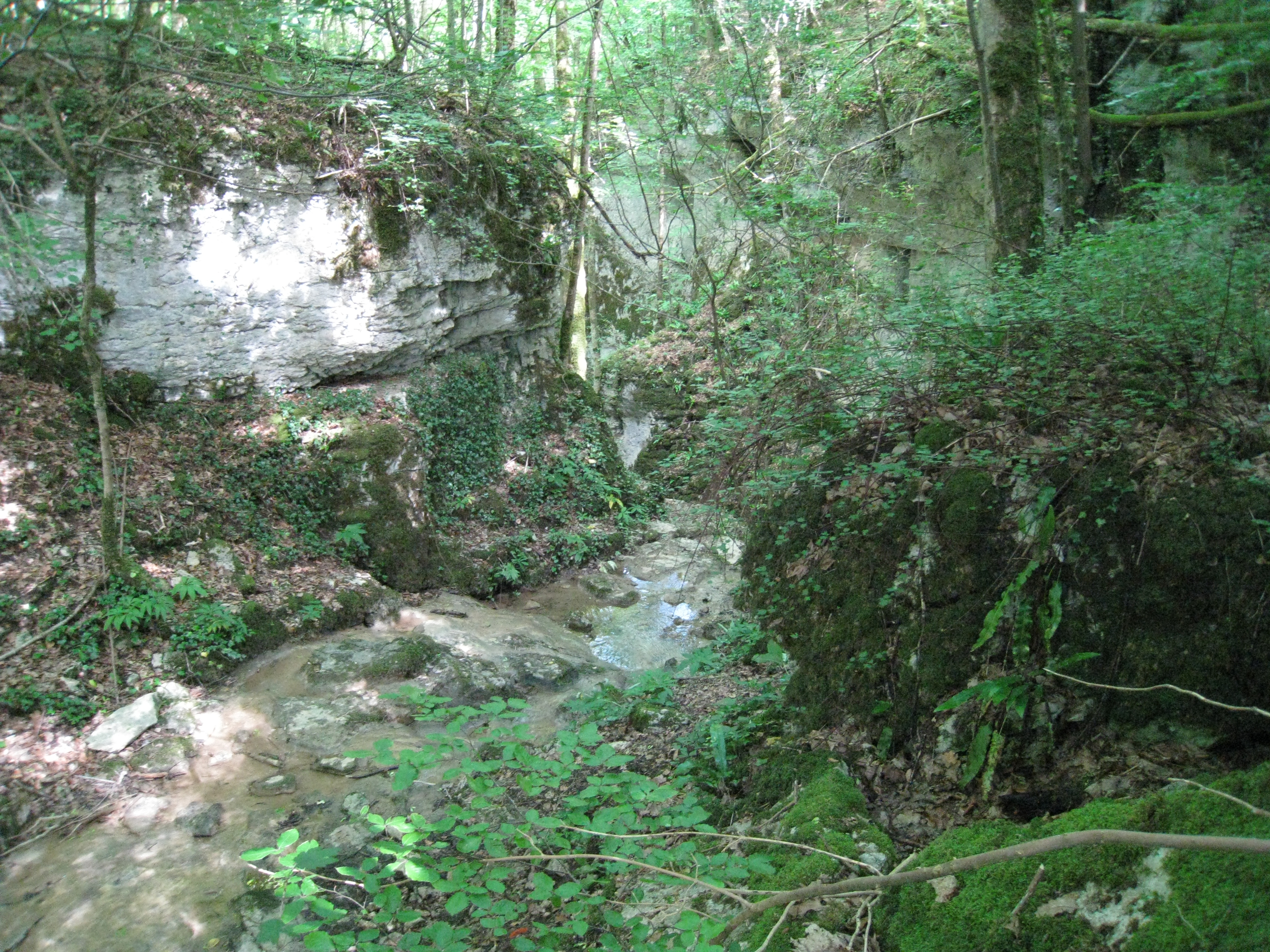
Gorges de la Vingeanne, the origin of the river

The Vinganne is a torrential watercourse. The source of the Vingeanne is near the village of Aprey, Haute-Marne. It forms as a stream that has carved a narrow canyon in the edge of the Langres plateau. It forms at an altitude of 429 metres (1,407 ft) and flows south for 92.9 kilometres (57.7 mi) to the Saône, which it joins at an altitude of 187 metres (614 ft). Tributaries are the streams (ruisseaux) of Flagey, Leuchey, Anjeurres and Orain.

=== Flow ===
A hydrological station measures the river's flow at Saint-Maurice-sur-Vingeanne, where it is fed by a watershed that covers 398 square kilometres (154 sq mi). The river there normally has average flow of around 8.43 cubic metres per second (298 cu ft/s) in February, falling to 0.914 cubic metres per second (32.3 cu ft/s) in August. The maximum instantaneous flow was recorded on 30 December 2001 at 61.4 cubic metres per second (2,170 cu ft/s).

A hydrological station measures the river's flow further down at Oisilly, where the Vingeanne captures water from an area of 609 square kilometres (235 sq mi). The river there normally has average flow of around 12.4 cubic metres per second (440 cu ft/s) in February, which falls to around 1.56 cubic metres per second (55 cu ft/s) in August. The maximum instantaneous flow was recorded on 27 April 1983 at 82 cubic metres per second (2,900 cu ft/s).

== Canal ==
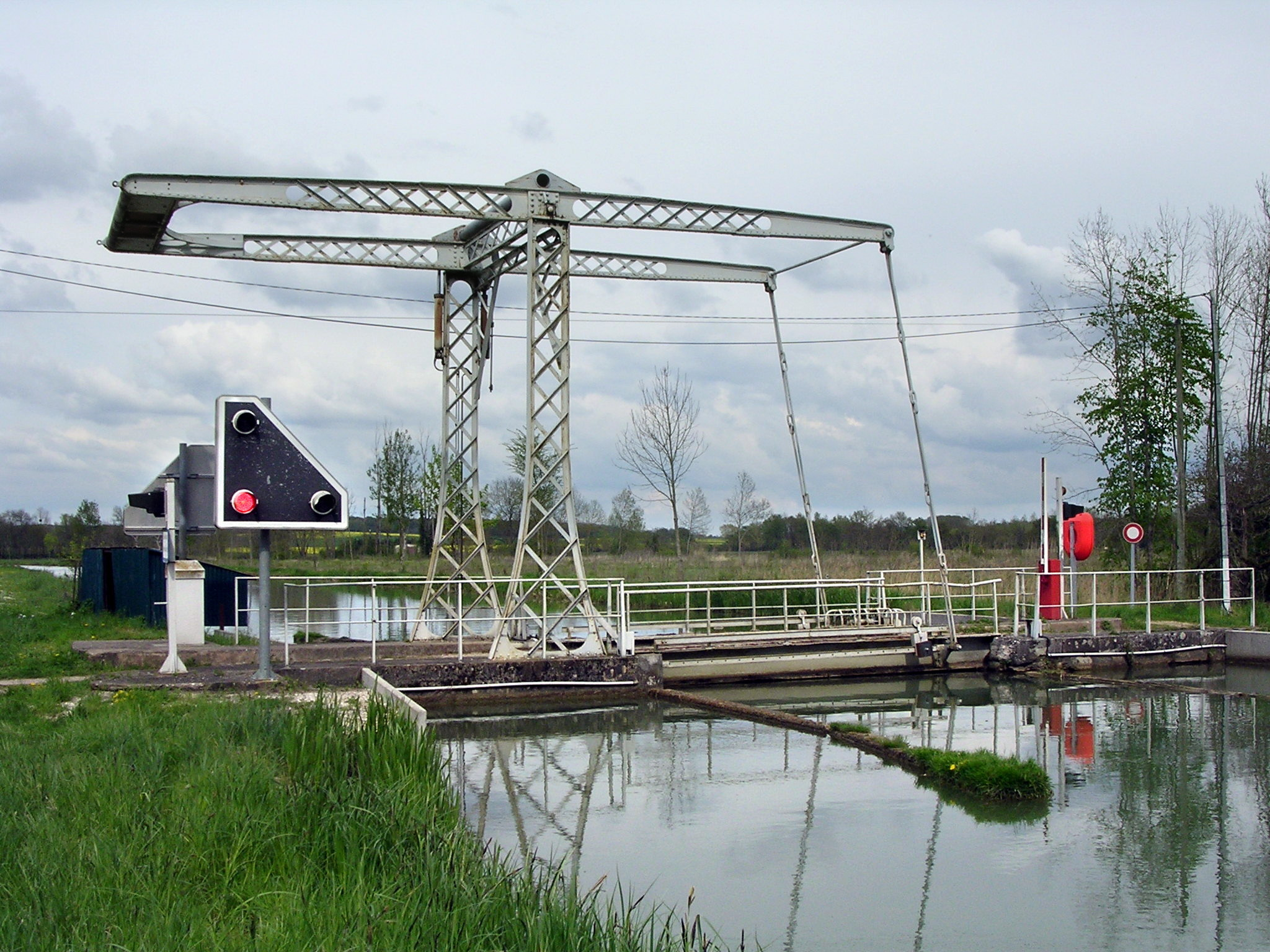
Rue du Moulin bridge over the canal at Cheuge. The river is about 50 metres (160 ft) from the canal here.thumb

The Canal entre Champagne et Bourgogne, crosses the Langres plateau watershed between the Marne to the northwest and the Saône to the southeast. Much of the route on the Saône side is along the Vingeanne valley. A barge travelling from the Saône up to the Langres plateau travels 62 kilometres (39 mi) and passes 43 locks with a total rise of 155 metres (509 ft). The canal crosses the watershed through the Balesmes tunnel at an elevation of 340 metres (1,120 ft). From there it travels 152 kilometres (94 mi) down to the navigable part of the Marne, and passes 71 locks with a total drop of 237 metres (778 ft).

A dependable supply of water is needed to replace the 800 cubic metres (28,000 cu ft) of water lost when a lock is operated and losses from leaking lock gates and other causes. The Langres plateau has 886 millimetres (34.9 in) of annual rainfall, and can supply sufficient water, but seasonal variations in the flow of the Marne and the Vingeanne make the water supply in summer unreliable. Reservoirs are needed to ensure a reliable supply year round. This was recognized by Roger de Fontenay in his 1781 plan for the canal, and again by Brière de Montidour, chief engineer of the Corps des Ponts et Chaussées, in 1835. The canal designers planned four reservoirs, three on the Marne side and the 8,300,000 cubic metres (290,000,000 cu ft) Lac de Villegusien on the Vingeanne.

== Lac de Villegusien ==
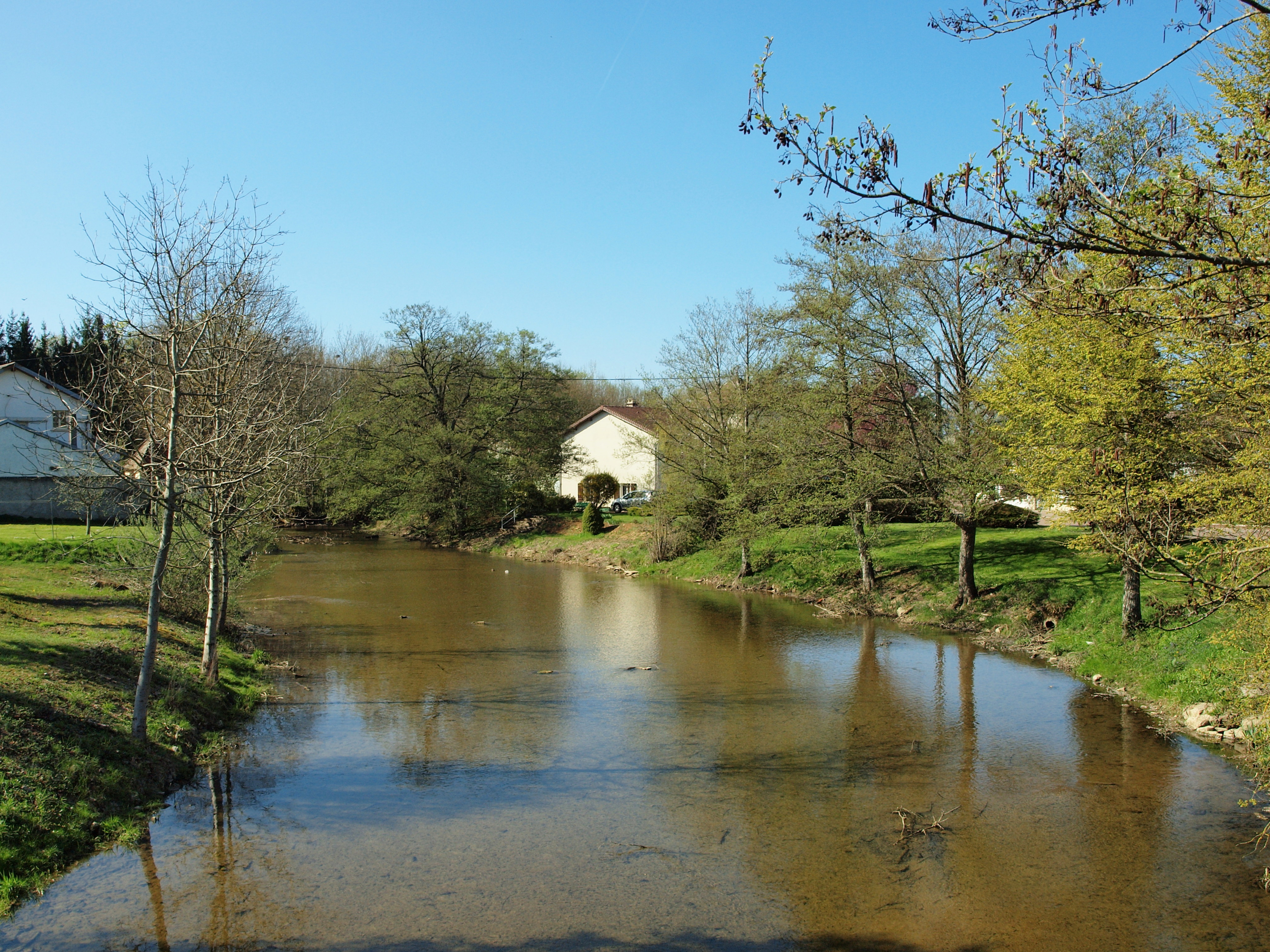
The river at Villegusien-le-Lac

The Lac de Villegusien, or Réservoir de la Vingeanne, is in the upper valley of the Vingeanne about 11 kilometres (6.8 mi) from its source. The reservoir is 36.96 metres (121.3 ft) below the upper reach of the canal in the Balesmes tunnel, which is supplied by the higher Lac de la Liez. The 1,254 metres (4,114 ft) cement-covered dyke of compacted clay-sand soil was built on the Vingeanne between 1902 and 1904, and was the longest in Europe at the time. The reservoir was put into operation in the winter of 1905-06, and the canal was opened for navigation in early 1907.

The reservoir covers 199 hectares (490 acres) and has a capacity of 8,700,000 cubic metres (310,000,000 cu ft). There are two intake turrets, which may send some of the water to the Moulin de Villegusien. A large cast iron pipe has the potential to supply water for power generation, but was not used as of 2017. The lake is used for swimming, sailing, fishing and bird watching.

The village of Villegusien-le-Lac is just southeast of the lake, between it and the canal.

=== Fish ===
The Vingeanne is an exceptional 2nd category river because it shelters many species of fish. Trout and "Satoille" (probably the European river lamprey) were fished in the Bèze, the Saône and Vingeanne in the Middle Ages. Margaret III, Countess of Flanders recounts having tasted the fish in 1382–83. Some of the upstream courses have trout, and the Dame Fario (Salmo trutta fario: brown trout) is common upstream with a spawning area in Saint Maurice sur Vingeanne. There are many species of cyprinids and pike is present throughout. The Amicale des pêcheurs de haute et moyenne Vingeanne, a fishers' association, practices a heritage management policy, and releases rainbow trout for the opening of the season in March and for holidaymakers in June.

== Historical facts ==
=== Lait Pur Sterilisé de la Vingeanne ===
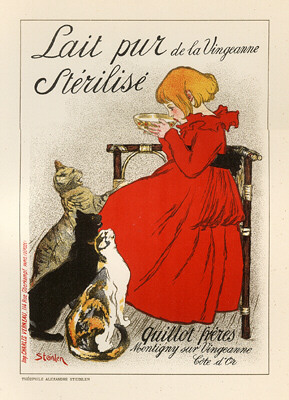
Lait Pur Sterilise de la Vingeanne by Théophile Steinlen

The Quillot Brothers had a dairy in the village of Montigny sur Vingeanne where they produced sterilized milk. In 1897, they commissioned the Swiss artist Théophile Steinlen (1859–1923) to produce a poster advertising their product. The result was an endearing poster that shows the artist's daughter Colette tasting a bowl of milk before giving it to the family cats, who are waiting expectantly.

Steinlen was a prolific artist, but this early work is his most successful poster.

=== Battle of Vingeanne ===
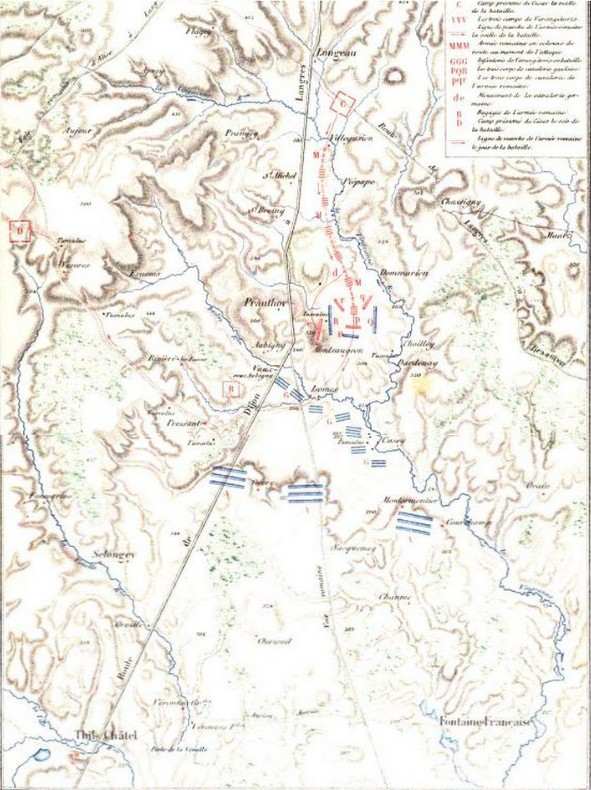
Battle of Vingeanne July 52 BC

In July 52 BC the Roman general Julius Caesar fought an important battle of the Gallic Wars against a coalition of Gauls led by Vercingetorix. Caesar responded to an attack against Gallia Narbonensis by leading his forces east through Lingones territory towards Sequani territory, probably marching down the Vingeanne valley. He had recently recruited (or hired) German cavalry, and they would prove decisive.

The Gallic army held a very strong position guarded by high slopes, easy to defend. It was protected by the Vingeanne on the right, and the Badin, a small tributary of the Vingeanne, on its front. In the space between these two streams and the road from Dijon to Langres was an area 5 kilometres (3.1 mi) across, slightly uneven in some parts, almost flat everywhere else, mainly between the Vingeanne and the hillock of Montsuageon. Near the road, and to the west, rise hills which dominated the ground, as well as the whole country, up to the Badin and the Vingeanne.

The Gauls thought the Romans were retreating towards Italy and decided to attack. One group of Gallic cavalry blocked the Roman advance while two groups of cavalry harried the Roman's flanks. After hard fighting, the German cavalry broke the Gallic cavalry on the right and chased them back to the main Gallic infantry force. The remaining Gallic cavalry fled, and Vercingetorix was forced to retreat to Alesia, where he was besieged by the Romans. The Battle of Alesia decided the war in the Romans' favor.

== Communes ==
The Vingeanne crosses 3 departments and 30 communes:

- In Haute-Marne it crosses Aprey, Baissey, Choilley-Dardenay, Cusey, Dommarien, Longeau-Percey, Villegusien-le-Lac and Villiers-lès-Aprey.
- In Côte-d'Or it crosses Beaumont-sur-Vingeanne, Blagny-sur-Vingeanne, Champagne-sur-Vingeanne, Chaume-et-Courchamp, Cheuge, Dampierre-et-Flée, Fontaine-Française, Heuilley-sur-Saône, Jancigny, Licey-sur-Vingeanne, Montigny-Mornay-Villeneuve-sur-Vingeanne, Oisilly, Pouilly-sur-Vingeanne, Renève, Saint-Maurice-sur-Vingeanne, Saint-Seine-sur-Vingeanne and Talmay.
- In Haute-Saône it crosses Attricourt, Germigney, Lœuilley, Percey-le-Grand and Saint-Sauveur.

== Sources ==
- Beck, Corinne (2008), Les eaux et forêts en Bourgogne ducale (vers 1350-vers 1480): Société et biodiversité, L'Harmattan, ISBN 9782296058507
- Bidaut, Jean-Yves, "Sources et gorges de la Vingeanne", chemindeleau.com (in French)
- Degoy, Bertrand, "Lac de Villegusien ou réservoir de la Vingeanne", chemindeleau.com (in French)
- Degoy, Bertrand (4 March 2015), L'alimentation en eau du canal de Champagne en Bourgogne (in French)
- Jacquinot (1908), "Le Réservoir de la Vingeanne", Annales des ponts et chaussées. 1ère partie. Mémoires et documents relatifs à l'art des constructions et au service de l'ingénieur (in French)
- "Lait pur stérilisé de la Vingeanne", Yaneff International Gallery
- Le mot du Président (in French), Amicale des pêcheurs de haute et moyenne Vingeanne
- Napoléon, III (1866), Histoire de Jules César (in French), Henri Plon
- Rickard, J. (24 March 2009), Battle of the Vingeanne, July 52 B.C.
- "U0924010 La Vingeanne à Saint-Maurice-sur-Vingeanne", Eaufrance (in French), Ministère de l'Ecologie, du Développement Durable et de l'Energie, 2015
- "U0924020 La Vingeanne à Oisilly", Eaufrance (in French), Ministère de l'Ecologie, du Développement Durable et de l'Energie, 2015
