= Heuilley =

Heuilley may refer to the following communes in France:

- Heuilley-Cotton, in the Haute-Marne department
- Heuilley-le-Grand, in the Haute-Marne department
- Heuilley-sur-Saône, in the Côte-d'Or department
