= Véronique Filozof =

French painter

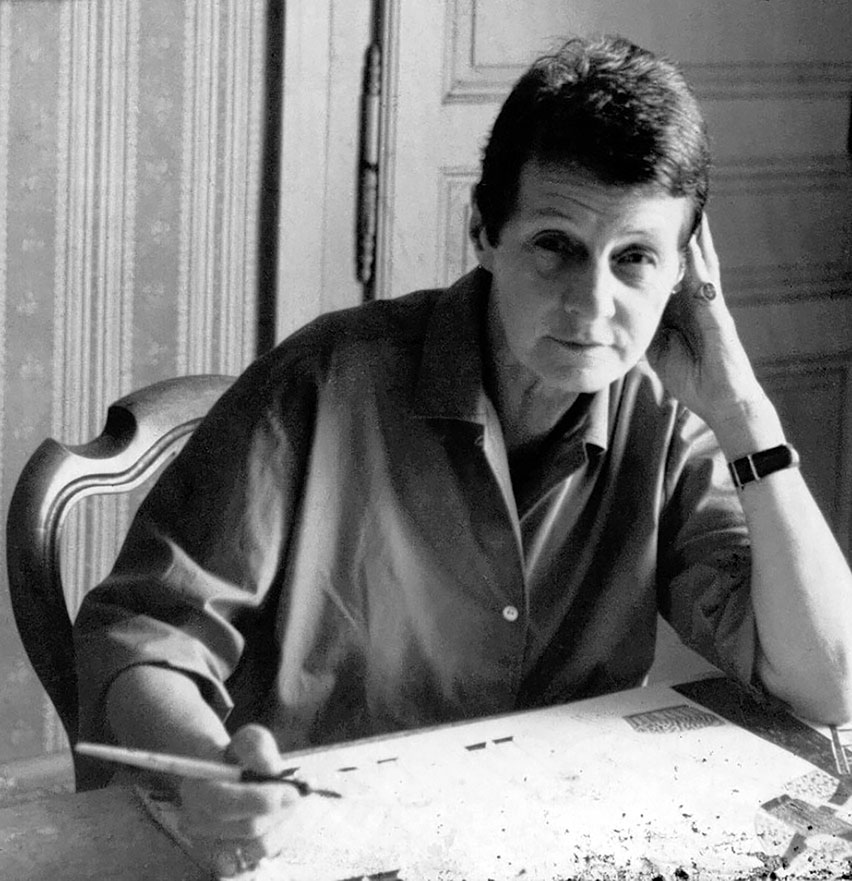
- Born: Véréna Valérie Sandreuter; 8 August 1904; Basel, Switzerland
- Died: 12 January 1977 (aged 72); Mulhouse, Alsace, France
- Resting place: Cimetière protestant de Mulhouse, Mulhouse
- Notable work: Le Périgord Noir (1954); The Palais-Royal as told by Jean Cocteau and seen by Véronique Filozof (1959-1960); Sarlat (1968); May '68 (1969); La Danse Macabre (1976)
- Spouses: Paul Modin (m. 1923; div. 1937) Georges Filozof (m. 1940; died 1974)
- Children: 2

Véronique Filozof (8 August 1904 – 12 January 1977) was a Swiss-born French painter, illustrator, and muralist.

== Biography ==
Filozof was born Véréna Valérie Sandreuter in Basel on 8 August 1904. Her father Rudolf Sandreuter was a blacksmith and musician, and her great-uncle was the painter Hans Sandreuter. Filozof was educated at the School of Fine Arts in Basel alongside her sister Élisabeth and her brother Hans.

in 1922, Filozof moved to Troyes in order to improve her French. The following year, in 1923, Filozof married Paul Modin, a school administrator. Filozof and Modin lived in Mulhouse and had two children Paulette and Jean-Guy, before divorcing in 1937. In 1940, Filozof married Georges Filozof (1896–1974), a mining engineer of Polish descent.

Following the German Occupation of France in June 1940, Filozof fled Mulhouse with her husband and children to Elne, where she became involved with Swiss Red Cross efforts at Maternité Suisse d'Elne. In 1941, Filozof moved to Sarlat-la-Canéda for her husband's work and established a sewing workshop to support local families and the French Resistance network 'Bataillons de la Liberté du Sud'. During this time Filozof formed close ties with the poet Jean Monestier.

In 1946, the family returned to Mulhouse. Filozof began to devote herself to painting, and established an artistic space in her attic. The artistic space, known as 'Le Grenier de Véronique', became a meeting place for the local post-war intelligentsia.

== Artistic career ==
Filozof's professional artistic career spanned from 1948 to 1976, with her continuing to produce work up until her death in 1977. In 1948, with encouragement from Pierre Betz, Filozof began to develop her distinctive style. Believing all art in all forms to be interconnected, Filozof started to incorporate quotes and excerpts from poets, writers and philosophers into her artworks . Her first exhibition, held in October 1949 at the Galerie Rivière in Sarlat-la-Canéda, was well received and praised by art critic George Besson

Filozof was known for her ink drawings and for her mural decorations in both civil and religious settings. Filozof received the Swiss Prize for Best Children's Book twice in 1962 for Les Fables de La Fontaine, and in 1965 for Le Vogelgryff. During her career Filozof set up a studio in Paris and was associated with Paul Éluard, Jean Dubuffet and formed friendships with Aristide Caillaud, Robert Morel and Aurélie Nemours. In the 1960s Filozof was a part of Salon Comparaisons.

=== Murals ===
In 1969, Filozof created a seven panel bas-relief mural for then headquarters of the Comité Interprofessionnel Logement Guyenne Gascogne in Bordeaux. Decorating the façade of the Le Médoc office building, the mural depicts iconic elements of Bordeaux's landscape and culture and includes quotes from Simone Weil, Johann Wolfgang von Goethe, Aristote, Jean Cocteau, Montesquieu, Antoine de Saint Exupéry and Gabriel Rosset.

In 1972, Filozof created a fresco in the entrance hall of a kindergarten in Manosque. Filozof created a number of murals for private clients, particularly in Dordogne, Mulhouse, and Basel. A number of Filozof's murals are no longer in existence, including frescoes at a retirement home in The Hague and a series of 15 tapestries for Saint-François d'Assise Hospital in Rotterdam.

In religious architecture, she created a Chemin de Croix (held in a private collection) and a Christmas Nativity Scene, acquired by the State and presented in 1956 at the Chapelle Notre-Dame-du-Haut in Ronchamp. Some surviving works include a marble engraving in the Sacré-Cœur Church in Mulhouse, the stained-glass window La Création in the Cheuge Church in Côte-d'Or (dated 1975), and a mural panel, Jérusalem au temps du Christ, in the Temple Saint-Jean in Mulhouse (1973). Other works have been lost, such as the seven Calvary scenes created for the church of Plonévez-du-Faou.

=== Legacy ===
Following Filozof's death in 1977 a tribute was held at the Théâtre Municipal in Sarlat-la-Canéda. In 1978 tributes were held at the Ecole élémentaire Jules Ferry in Sarlat-la-Canéda, at the Salon d'Art Sacré in Paris and by the Société Industrielle de Mulhouse at the Galerie A.M.C. in Mulhouse.

Filozof's grave at the Cimetière protestant de Mulhouse is engraved with Filozof's illustration of God, and has site patrimonial remarquable protected status. The nursery school "École maternelle publique Véronique Filozof" in Mulhouse, and the Cour Véronique Filozof in Sarlat-la-Canéda are named after Filozof.

== Book illustrations ==
List of book illustrations
- Filozof, Véronique; Bloc, André (1954). Périgord noir [Black Perigord]. Espace (in French). L'Architecture d'aujourd'hui.
- Filozof, Véronique; Modin, Jean-Guy (1955). Sonnets sans corset [Songs without corsets] (in French). Illustrated by Véronique Filozof.
- Filozof, Véronique (1957). La Bible en images [The Bible in pictures] (in French). Paris: La Bergerie.
- Filozof, Véronique (1957). Les Saints de tous les jours de juin [The Saints of every day in June]. Sainte Germaine (in French). Paris: Livre chrétien.
- Filozof, Véronique (1960). Le Pré spirituel [The Spiritual Meadow] (in French). Illustrated by Véronique Filozof. Paris: Le Club du livre chrétien.
- Filozof, Véronique; Cocteau, Jean (1960). Le Palais Royal [The Royal Palace] (Swiss edition Lambert-Schneider, Heidelberg, 1959) (in French). Illustrated by Véronique Filozof. Paris: L'Architecture d'aujourd'hui.
- Filozof, Véronique (1962). La vie en Appenzell [La vie en Appenzell] (in French). Zurich: Die Arche.
- Filozof, Véronique (1962). La Haggada de Pâque [The Passover Haggadah] (in French). Robert Morel.
- Filozof, Véronique (1962). Die Fabeln von Jean de La Fontaine [The Fables of Jean de La Fontaine] (in German). Bâle: Pharos Verlag.
- Filozof, Véronique; Koller, Angela (1962). Hannibal der Tolggi (in German). Illustrated by Véronique Filozof. Zurich: Schweizer Spiegel Verlag.
- Filozof, Véronique (1962). Bestiaire de Brunet Latin [Brunet's Bestiary Latin] (transcription Charles Moulin, original drawings and gouaches, limited edition of 50) (in French). Illustrated by Véronique Filozof. Paris: Jacques Vialetay.
- Maulini, Marcel (1964). Comprendre Ronchamp [Understanding Ronchamp] (Indian ink drawing on the cover) (in French). Illustrated by Véronique Filozof. Dôle: imprimerie Chazelle.
- Filozof, Véronique (1964). Grosses et petites bêtes [Large and small animals] (poems by Jean-Guy Modin) (in French). Paris: Anti Poète.
- Filozof, Véronique (1965). Chansons bibliques du Père Cocagnac [Biblical songs by Father Cocagnac] (2 series in French and German) (in French). Paris: Cerf.
- Filozof, Véronique (1965). Véronique Filozof au Zoo [Véronique Filozof at the Zoo] (text by Robert Morel) (in French). Lombreuil: Les Nouvelles Images.
- Filozof, Véronique; Schoellkopf, Niggi (1964). Der Vogel Gryff [The bird Gryff] (Prize for the best Swiss book 1965) (in German). Illustrated by Véronique Filozof. Balis: Pharos Verlag.
- Filozof, Véronique (1967). Laura (color brochure) (in French). Lahr: éditions Kaufmann Verlag.
- Filozof, Véronique (1969). Mai 1968 [May 1968] (38 drawings from the book acquired by the City of Paris and conserved in 2012 at the National Center for Visual Arts - contemporary art collection) (in French). Paris: édition du temps.
- Filozof, Véronique (1972). Pollution (in French). Lombreuil: Les Nouvelles Images.
- Filozof, Véronique (1975). Histoires d'oiseaux [Bird stories] (poems by Édith Penzo) (in French). Faverolles: éditions de La Tour.
- Filozof, Véronique (1976). La Danse macabre [The Dance of Death] (in French). Balis: Pharos Verlag.
- Filozof, Véronique (1976a). Le jour où les oiseaux [The day the birds] (poems by Jacques Laffont) (in French). Paris: Germinal.
- Duluat, Claudine; Pouget, Jeanine (1991). Recettes du Quercy [Quercy recipes] (in French). Illustrated by Véronique Filozof. Carlucet: éditions du Laquet.
- Duluat, Claudine; Modin, Jean-Guy (1992). Recettes du Périgord [Périgord recipes] (in French). Illustrated by Véronique Filozof. Carlucet: éditions du Laquet.
- Brousmiche, Anne (2013). Lucarnes : Haïkus [Lucarnes: Haikus] (in French). Illustrated by Véronique Filozof. Bourges: Thierry Sajat.
- Brousmiche, Anne (2018). Le grain des fables : Haïkus [The spice of fables: Haïkus] (in French). Illustrated by Véronique Filozof. Paris: Thierry Sajat.

== Bibliography ==
- Cabanel, Patrick (2020). "FILOZOF Véronique (née Verena Valérie Sandreuter)" [FILOZOF Véronique (born Verena Valérie Sandreuter)]. Dictionnaire biographiques des protestants français de 1787 à nos jours : Tome 2 : D-G [Biographical dictionary of French Protestants from 1787 to the present day: Volume 2: D-G] (in French). Paris: Les Éditions de Paris. pp. 566–568. ISBN 978-2-84621-288-5.
- Wetzig, René; Brousmiche, Anne (2020). "Filozof Véronique" [Filozof Véronique]. Autoportraits et portraits d'artistes peintres alsaciens [Self-portraits and portraits of Alsatian painters] (in French). Colmar/Strasbourg: Éd. Jérôme Do Bentzinger. pp. 151–153. ISBN 978-2-849607343.
- Held, Jean-Francis (1969). "Mai 68, images de Véronique Filozof" [May '68, images by Véronique Filozof] (PDF). Le Nouvel Observateur (in French). Archived from the original (PDF) on 27 January 2023.
- Amacher, Urs (2004). "Die Einladungskarten der Véronique Filozof: Kunstwerke aus dem Bundesordner : Zum 100. Geburtstag der Künstlerin" [The invitation cards of Véronique Filozof: artworks from the federal folder: for the 100th birthday of the artist]. Zeitschrift für schweizerische Archäologie und Kunstgeschichte (in German). 61 (3): 175–182. Archived from the original on 4 March 2016.
- Hovald, Patrice; Schwobthaler, Alex (1986). Véronique Filozof, la glorieuse [Véronique Filozof, the glorious one] (in French). Besançon: Néo-Typo.
- Morel, Marie (1993). "Véronique Filozof". Regard (Revue), petite revue d'art et de poésie (in French). 35.
- Allemand, Maurice; Allemand, Yvonne (1979). Véronique Filozof. 1904–1977. Dessins – gouaches – livres illustrés, catalogue d'exposition de la Maison de la Culture de Saint Étienne et La Haye [Véronique Filozof. 1904–1977. Drawings – gouaches – illustrated books, exhibition catalog of the Maison de la Culture de Saint Étienne et La Haye] (in French).
- "Véronique Filozof". Bulletin des bibliothèques de France (in French). 15 (7). 1970. Archived from the original on 4 March 2016.
- Delarge, Jean-Pierre (2001). Dictionnaire des arts plastiques modernes et contemporains [Dictionary of modern and contemporary visual arts] (in French). Éditions Gründ. ISBN 978-2-7000-3055-6.
- Chambon, Richard (2012). "Véronique Filozof (1904–1977), une artiste-peintre bâloise devenue sarladaise" [Véronique Filozof (1904–1977), a painter from Basel who became a Sarladaise]. Bulletin de la Société d'Art et d'Histoire de Sarlat et du Périgord Noir (in French) (130 « Sarlat, de l'occupation allemande à la naissance d'une artiste»).
- Cocteau, Jean (1960). Le Palais-Royal raconté par Jean Cocteau vu par Véronique Filozof [The Palais-Royal as told by Jean Cocteau and seen by Véronique Filozof] (in French). Heidelberg. p. 94.
- Brousmiche, Anne (5 October 2024). "Danses macabres européennes" [European macabre dances] (PDF). Mémoire Mulhousienne, Colloque sur le devenir des cimetières (in French). Archived from the original (PDF) on 1 December 2024.
