= Lac de Villegusien =

Lake in Haute-Marne, France

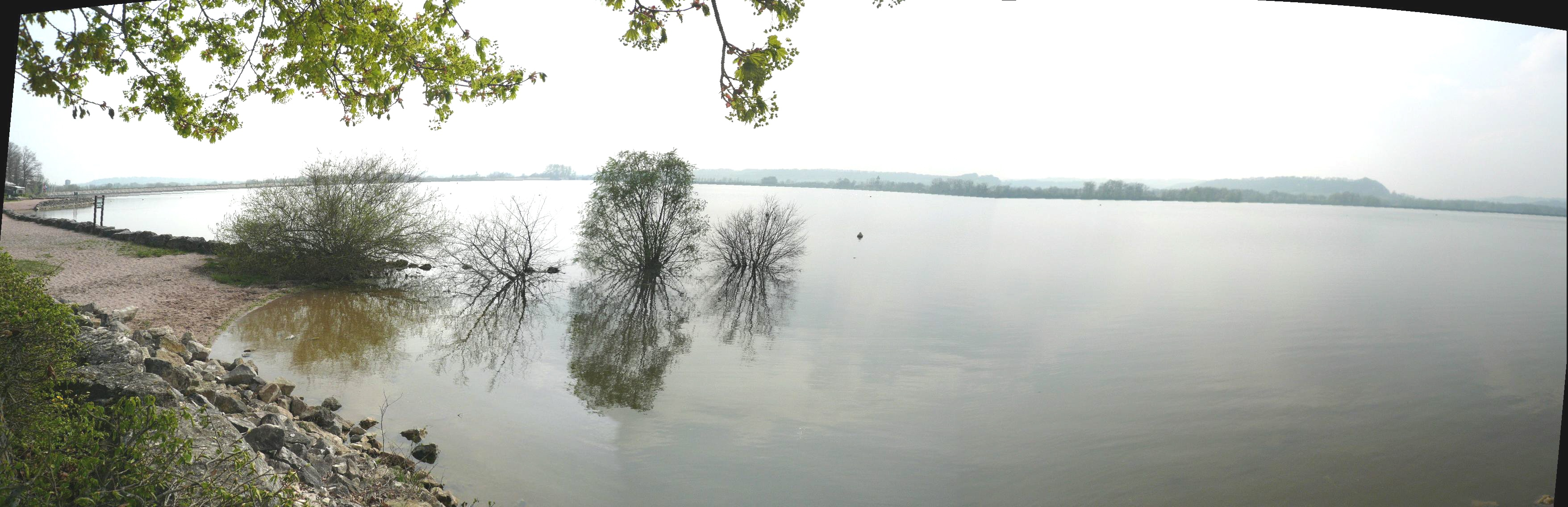

- Location within Grand Est
- Location: Haute-Marne
- Coordinates: 47°44′44″N 5°18′45″E
- Primary inflows: Vingeanne river
- Basin countries: France
- Surface area: 1.99 km^{2} (0.77 sq mi)
- Max. depth: 10 m (33 ft)
- Water volume: 8.3×10^{6} m^{3} (290×10^{6} cu ft)
- Surface elevation: 300 m (980 ft)

Lac de Villegusien (also known as Réservoir de la Vingeanne) is an artificial lake in Haute-Marne, France. Its surface area is 1.99 km^{2}. The lake was built to fill the Canal entre Champagne et Bourgogne, connecting the Marne and the Saône rivers.

The Lac de Villegusien lies in the communes of Villegusien-le-Lac and Longeau-Percey.
