= Renève =

- Commune
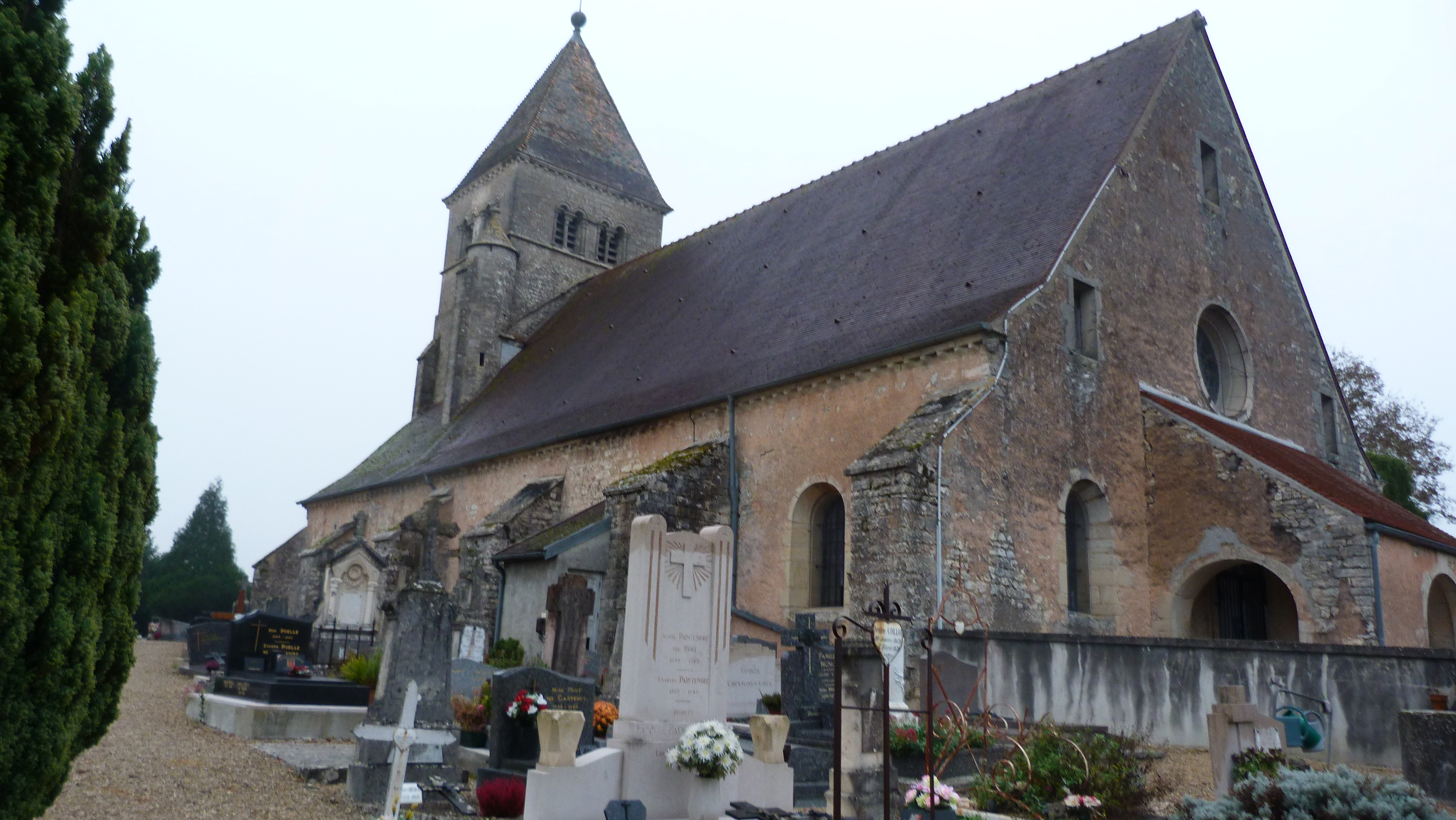
- The church in Renève

- Coat of arms
- Location of Renève
- Location within France Location within Bourgogne-Franche-Comté
- Coordinates: 47°24′15″N 5°24′23″E
- Country: France
- Region: Bourgogne-Franche-Comté
- Department: Côte-d'Or
- Arrondissement: Dijon
- Canton: Saint-Apollinaire

Government
  - Mayor (2020–2026): Bernard Petit
- Area^{1}: 14.4 km^{2} (5.6 sq mi)
- Elevation: 200 m (660 ft)
- Highest elevation: 241 m (791 ft)
- Lowest elevation: 196 m (643 ft)
- Population (2023): 487
  - Density: 33.8/km^{2} (87.6/sq mi)
- Time zone: UTC+01:00 (CET)
  - Summer (DST): UTC+02:00 (CEST)
- INSEE/Postal code: 21522 /21310
- ^{1} French Land Register data, which excludes lakes, ponds, glaciers > 1 km^{2} (0.386 sq mi or 247 acres) and river estuaries.

Renève (French pronunciation: [ʁənɛv]) is a commune in the Côte-d'Or department in eastern France, 30 km north east of Dijon. It sits on the Vingeanne river, close to the Canal entre Champagne et Bourgogne.

The town was the site of Queen Brunhilda of Austrasia's torture and execution in 613, the aged monarch being racked for three days, and then torn apart by horses.

== Population ==
Historical population
Year	Pop.	±% p.a.
1968	341	—
1975	377	+1.44%
1982	389	+0.45%
1990	406	+0.54%
1999	414	+0.22%
2007	425	+0.33%
2012	423	−0.09%
2017	438	+0.70%
2023	487	+1.78%
Source: INSEE

== See also ==
- Communes of the Côte-d'Or department
