= Licey-sur-Vingeanne =

- Commune
- Location of Licey-sur-Vingeanne
- Location within France Location within Bourgogne-Franche-Comté
- Coordinates: 47°28′55″N 5°22′56″E
- Country: France
- Region: Bourgogne-Franche-Comté
- Department: Côte-d'Or
- Arrondissement: Dijon
- Canton: Saint-Apollinaire

Government
  - Mayor (2020–2026): Dominique Matiron
- Area^{1}: 3.39 km^{2} (1.31 sq mi)
- Elevation: 223 m (732 ft)
- Highest elevation: 266 m (873 ft)
- Lowest elevation: 212 m (696 ft)
- Population (2023): 97
  - Density: 29/km^{2} (74/sq mi)
- Time zone: UTC+01:00 (CET)
  - Summer (DST): UTC+02:00 (CEST)
- INSEE/Postal code: 21348 /21610
- ^{1} French Land Register data, which excludes lakes, ponds, glaciers > 1 km^{2} (0.386 sq mi or 247 acres) and river estuaries.

Licey-sur-Vingeanne (French pronunciation: [lisɛ syʁ vɛ̃ʒan], literally Licey on Vingeanne) is a commune in the Côte-d'Or department in eastern France.

The Vingeanne river runs through the commune.

== Population ==
Historical population
Year	Pop.	±% p.a.
1968	100	—
1975	83	−2.63%
1982	72	−2.01%
1990	71	−0.17%
1999	85	+2.02%
2007	100	+2.05%
2012	108	+1.55%
2017	104	−0.75%
2023	97	−1.15%
Source: INSEE

== See also ==
- Communes of the Côte-d'Or department
