= Montigny-Mornay-Villeneuve-sur-Vingeanne =

- Commune
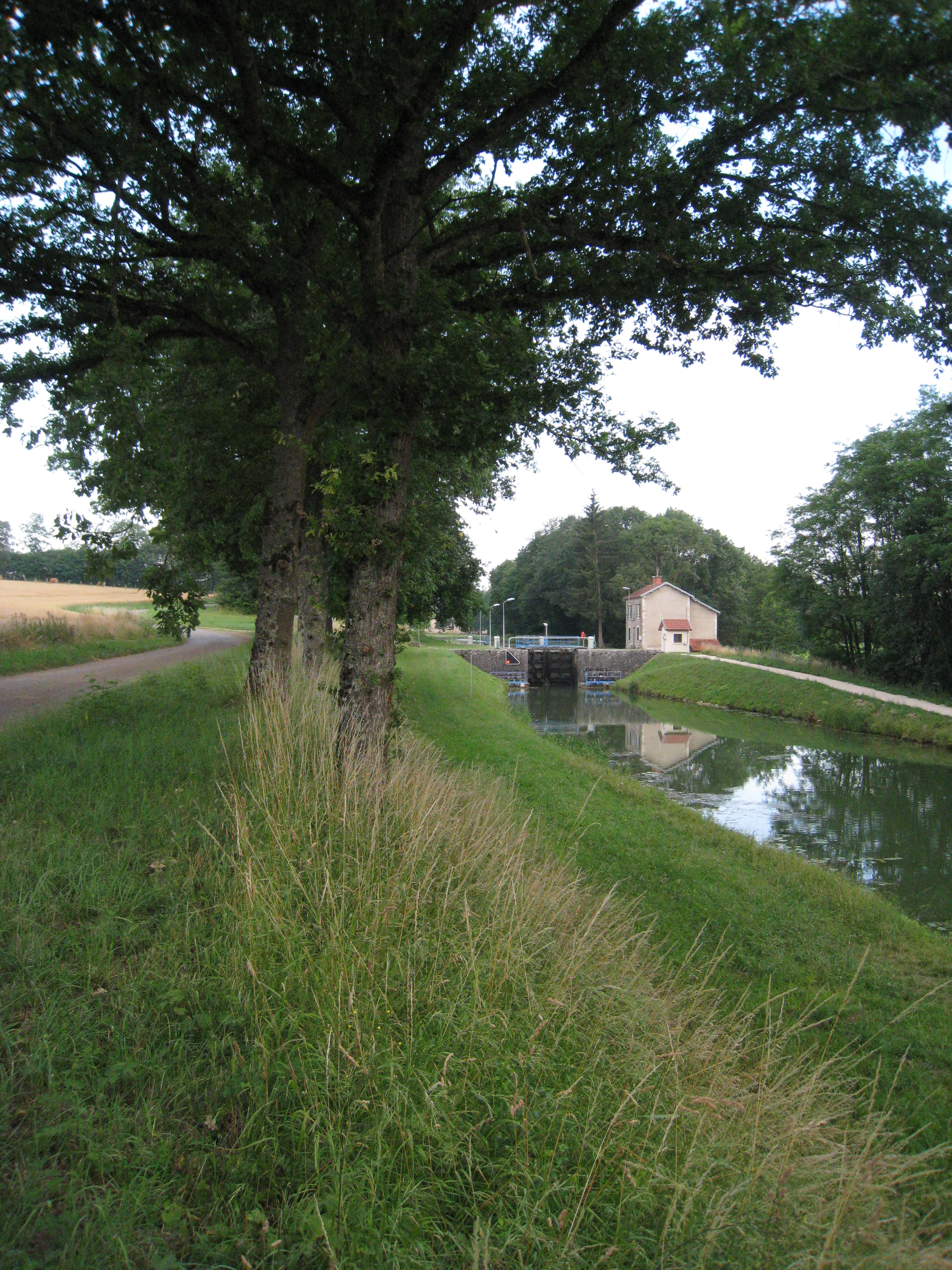
- Canal and lock at Villeneuve

- Coat of arms
- Location of Montigny-Mornay-Villeneuve-sur-Vingeanne
- Location within France Location within Bourgogne-Franche-Comté
- Coordinates: 47°33′58″N 5°26′19″E
- Country: France
- Region: Bourgogne-Franche-Comté
- Department: Côte-d'Or
- Arrondissement: Dijon
- Canton: Saint-Apollinaire

Government
  - Mayor (2020–2026): Anne Catrin
- Area^{1}: 30.83 km^{2} (11.90 sq mi)
- Highest elevation: 316 m (1,037 ft)
- Lowest elevation: 228 m (748 ft)
- Population (2023): 381
  - Density: 12.4/km^{2} (32.0/sq mi)
- Time zone: UTC+01:00 (CET)
  - Summer (DST): UTC+02:00 (CEST)
- INSEE/Postal code: 21433 /21610
- ^{1} French Land Register data, which excludes lakes, ponds, glaciers > 1 km^{2} (0.386 sq mi or 247 acres) and river estuaries.

Montigny-Mornay-Villeneuve-sur-Vingeanne (French pronunciation: [mɔ̃tiɲi mɔʁnɛ vilnœv syʁ vɛ̃ʒan]) is a commune in the Côte-d'Or department in eastern France. It was created in 1973 by the merger of three former communes: Montigny-sur-Vingeanne, Mornay and La Villeneuve-sur-Vingeanne. The Vingeanne river runs through the commune.

== Population ==
Historical population
Year	Pop.	±% p.a.
1968	425	—
1975	324	−3.80%
1982	278	−2.16%
1990	312	+1.45%
1999	358	+1.54%
2007	368	+0.34%
2012	371	+0.16%
2017	394	+1.21%
2023	381	−0.56%
Source: INSEE

== See also ==
- Communes of the Côte-d'Or department
