= Champagne-sur-Vingeanne =

- Commune
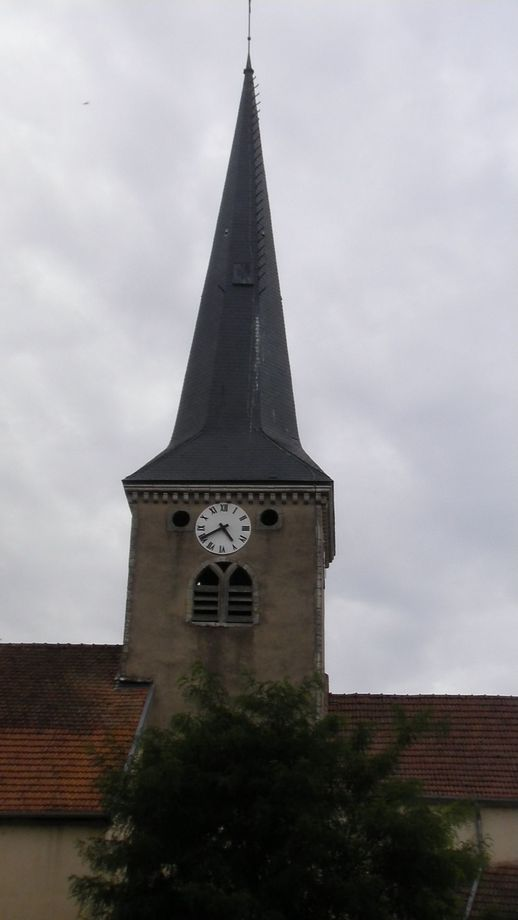
- The church in Champagne-sur-Vingeanne
- Location of Champagne-sur-Vingeanne
- Location within France Location within Bourgogne-Franche-Comté
- Coordinates: 47°26′49″N 5°23′32″E
- Country: France
- Region: Bourgogne-Franche-Comté
- Department: Côte-d'Or
- Arrondissement: Dijon
- Canton: Saint-Apollinaire

Government
  - Mayor (2021–2026): Roland Revel de Bretteville
- Area^{1}: 13.25 km^{2} (5.12 sq mi)
- Elevation: 220 m (720 ft)
- Highest elevation: 248 m (814 ft)
- Lowest elevation: 201 m (659 ft)
- Population (2023): 311
  - Density: 23.5/km^{2} (60.8/sq mi)
- Time zone: UTC+01:00 (CET)
  - Summer (DST): UTC+02:00 (CEST)
- INSEE/Postal code: 21135 /21310
- ^{1} French Land Register data, which excludes lakes, ponds, glaciers > 1 km^{2} (0.386 sq mi or 247 acres) and river estuaries.

Champagne-sur-Vingeanne (French pronunciation: [ʃɑ̃paɲ syʁ vɛ̃ʒan], literally Champagne on Vingeanne) is a commune in the Côte-d'Or department in eastern France.

The Vingeanne river runs through the commune.

== Population ==
Historical population
Year	Pop.	±% p.a.
1968	304	—
1975	250	−2.76%
1982	233	−1.00%
1990	241	+0.42%
1999	247	+0.27%
2007	243	−0.20%
2012	296	+4.02%
2017	315	+1.25%
2023	311	−0.21%
Source: INSEE

== See also ==
- Communes of the Côte-d'Or department
