= Saint-Maurice-sur-Vingeanne =

- Commune
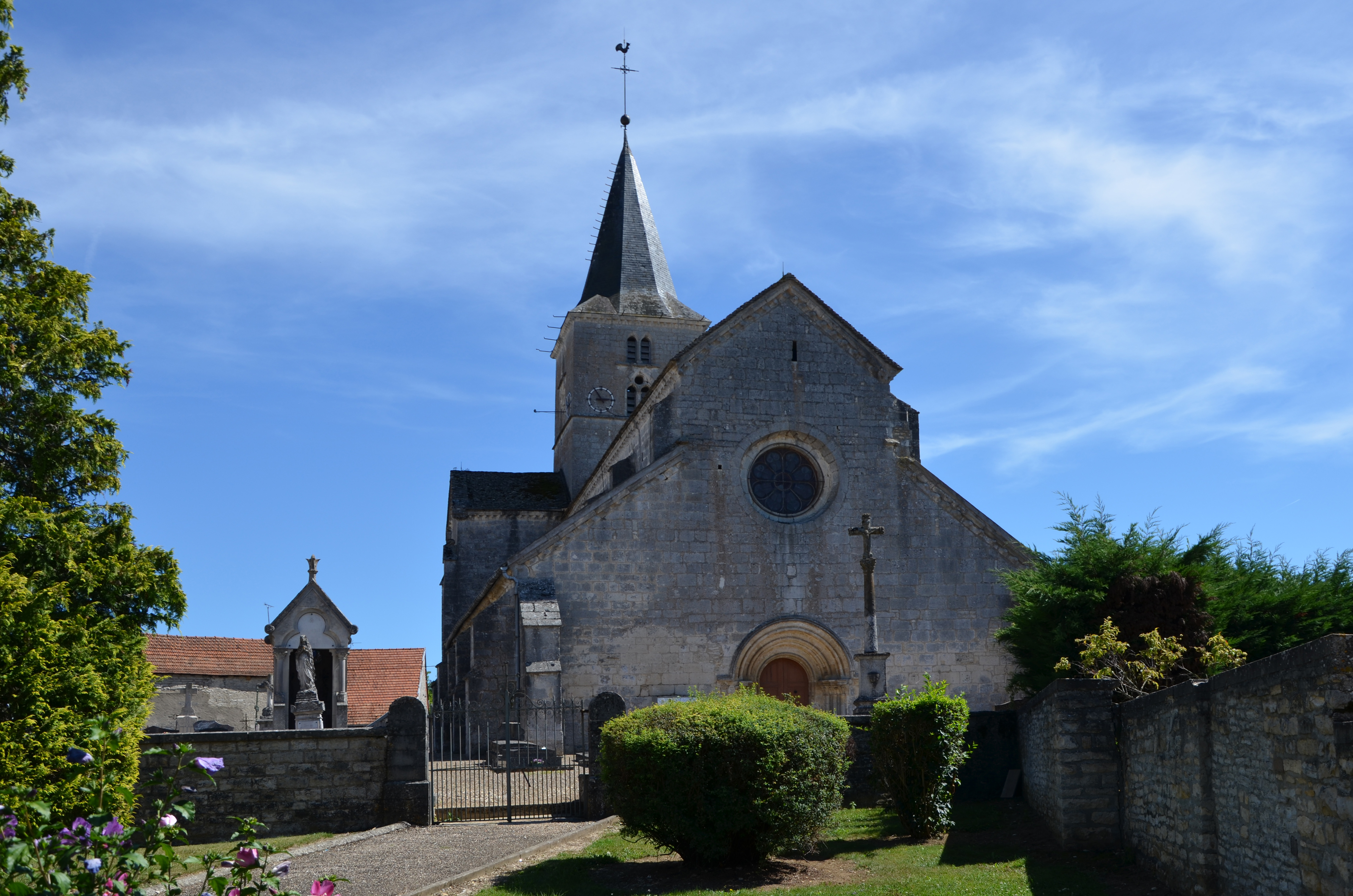
- The church in Saint-Maurice-sur-Vingeanne
- Location of Saint-Maurice-sur-Vingeanne
- Location within France Location within Bourgogne-Franche-Comté
- Coordinates: 47°34′46″N 5°24′32″E
- Country: France
- Region: Bourgogne-Franche-Comté
- Department: Côte-d'Or
- Arrondissement: Dijon
- Canton: Saint-Apollinaire
- Intercommunality: Mirebellois et Fontenois

Government
  - Mayor (2020–2026): Georges Apert
- Area^{1}: 17.38 km^{2} (6.71 sq mi)
- Elevation: 235 m (771 ft)
- Highest elevation: 297 m (974 ft)
- Lowest elevation: 232 m (761 ft)
- Population (2023): 198
  - Density: 11.4/km^{2} (29.5/sq mi)
- Time zone: UTC+01:00 (CET)
  - Summer (DST): UTC+02:00 (CEST)
- INSEE/Postal code: 21562 /21610
- ^{1} French Land Register data, which excludes lakes, ponds, glaciers > 1 km^{2} (0.386 sq mi or 247 acres) and river estuaries.

Saint-Maurice-sur-Vingeanne (French pronunciation: [sɛ̃ mɔʁis syʁ vɛ̃ʒan]; literally "Saint-Maurice on Vingeanne") is a commune in the Côte-d'Or department in eastern France.

The river Vingeanne runs through the commune.

== Population ==
Historical population
Year	Pop.	±% p.a.
1968	214	—
1975	184	−2.13%
1982	175	−0.71%
1990	139	−2.84%
1999	162	+1.72%
2007	193	+2.21%
2012	218	+2.47%
2017	213	−0.46%
2023	198	−1.21%
Source: INSEE

== See also ==
- Communes of the Côte-d'Or department
