= Pouilly-sur-Vingeanne =

- Commune
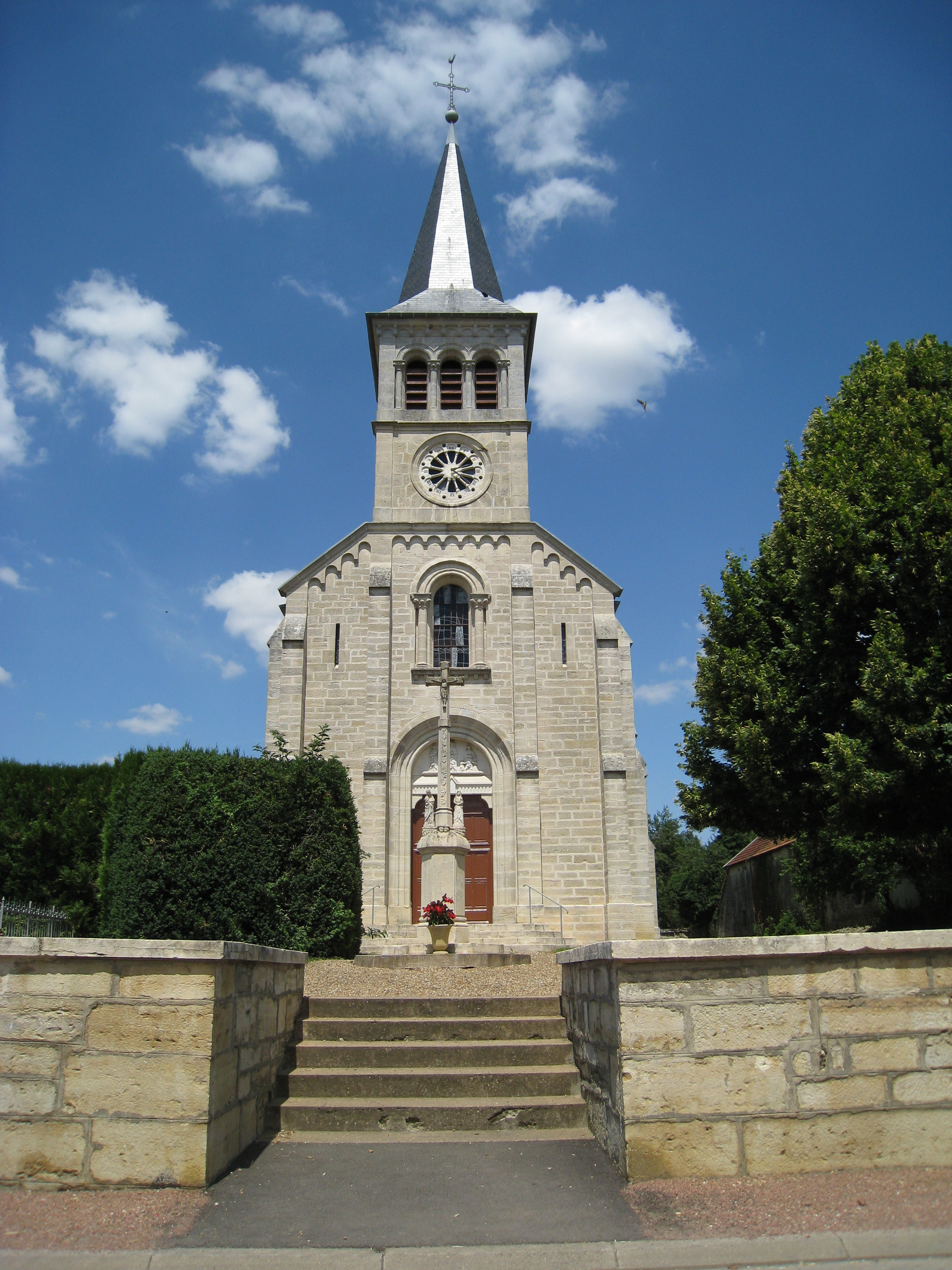
- The church in Pouilly-sur-Vingeanne
- Location of Pouilly-sur-Vingeanne
- Location within France Location within Bourgogne-Franche-Comté
- Coordinates: 47°32′27″N 5°25′58″E
- Country: France
- Region: Bourgogne-Franche-Comté
- Department: Côte-d'Or
- Arrondissement: Dijon
- Canton: Saint-Apollinaire

Government
  - Mayor (2020–2026): Nicolas Tassin
- Area^{1}: 10.56 km^{2} (4.08 sq mi)
- Elevation: 226 m (741 ft)
- Highest elevation: 288 m (945 ft)
- Lowest elevation: 223 m (732 ft)
- Population (2023): 132
  - Density: 12.5/km^{2} (32.4/sq mi)
- Time zone: UTC+01:00 (CET)
  - Summer (DST): UTC+02:00 (CEST)
- INSEE/Postal code: 21503 /21610
- ^{1} French Land Register data, which excludes lakes, ponds, glaciers > 1 km^{2} (0.386 sq mi or 247 acres) and river estuaries.

Pouilly-sur-Vingeanne (French pronunciation: [puji syʁ vɛ̃ʒan], literally Pouilly on Vingeanne) is a commune in the Côte-d'Or department in eastern France.

The Vingeanne river runs through the commune.

== Population ==
Historical population
Year	Pop.	±% p.a.
1968	119	—
1975	97	−2.88%
1982	94	−0.45%
1990	81	−1.84%
1999	92	+1.42%
2007	113	+2.60%
2012	116	+0.53%
2017	121	+0.85%
2023	132	+1.46%
Source: INSEE

== See also ==
- Communes of the Côte-d'Or department
