= Beaumont-sur-Vingeanne =

- Commune
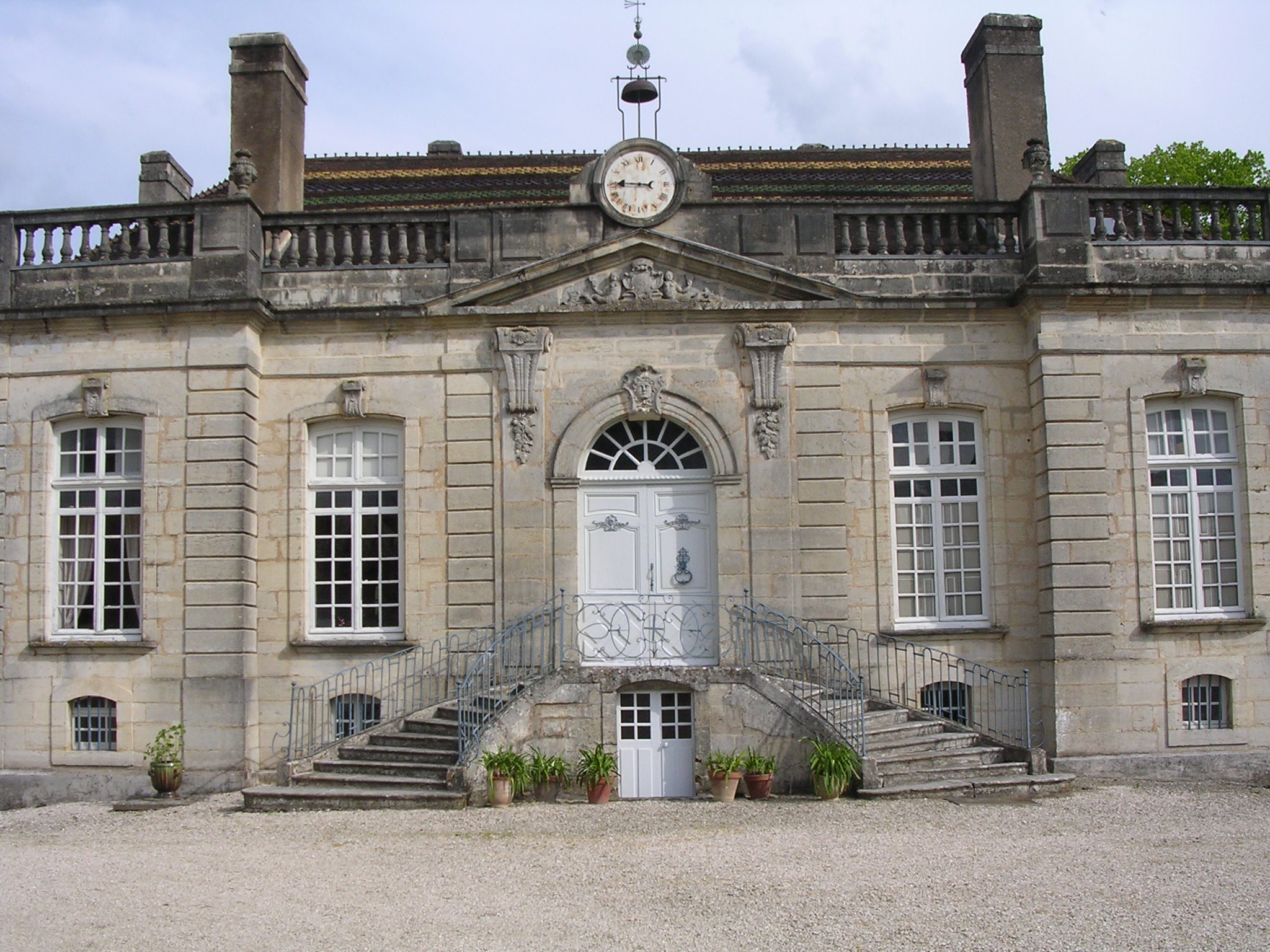
- 18th-century chateau

- Coat of arms
- Location of Beaumont-sur-Vingeanne
- Location within France Location within Bourgogne-Franche-Comté
- Coordinates: 47°27′56″N 5°21′50″E
- Country: France
- Region: Bourgogne-Franche-Comté
- Department: Côte-d'Or
- Arrondissement: Dijon
- Canton: Saint-Apollinaire

Government
  - Mayor (2020–2026): Brigitte Riviere Bove
- Area^{1}: 11.72 km^{2} (4.53 sq mi)
- Elevation: 245 m (804 ft)
- Highest elevation: 268 m (879 ft)
- Lowest elevation: 206 m (676 ft)
- Population (2023): 195
  - Density: 16.6/km^{2} (43.1/sq mi)
- Time zone: UTC+01:00 (CET)
  - Summer (DST): UTC+02:00 (CEST)
- INSEE/Postal code: 21053 /21310
- ^{1} French Land Register data, which excludes lakes, ponds, glaciers > 1 km^{2} (0.386 sq mi or 247 acres) and river estuaries.

Beaumont-sur-Vingeanne (French pronunciation: [bomɔ̃ syʁ vɛ̃ʒan], literally Beaumont on Vingeanne) is a commune in the Côte-d'Or department in eastern France.

The Vingeanne river runs through the commune.

== Population ==
Historical population
| Year | Pop. | ±% p.a. |
|---|---|---|
| 1968 | 161 | — |
| 1975 | 161 | +0.00% |
| 1982 | 188 | +2.24% |
| 1990 | 193 | +0.33% |
| 1999 | 163 | −1.86% |
| 2007 | 172 | +0.67% |
| 2012 | 196 | +2.65% |
| 2017 | 199 | +0.30% |
| 2023 | 195 | −0.34% |
Source: INSEE

== See also ==
- Communes of the Côte-d'Or department
