= Champagne-Burgundy Canal =

Canal in northeastern France

Canal entre Champagne et Bourgogne
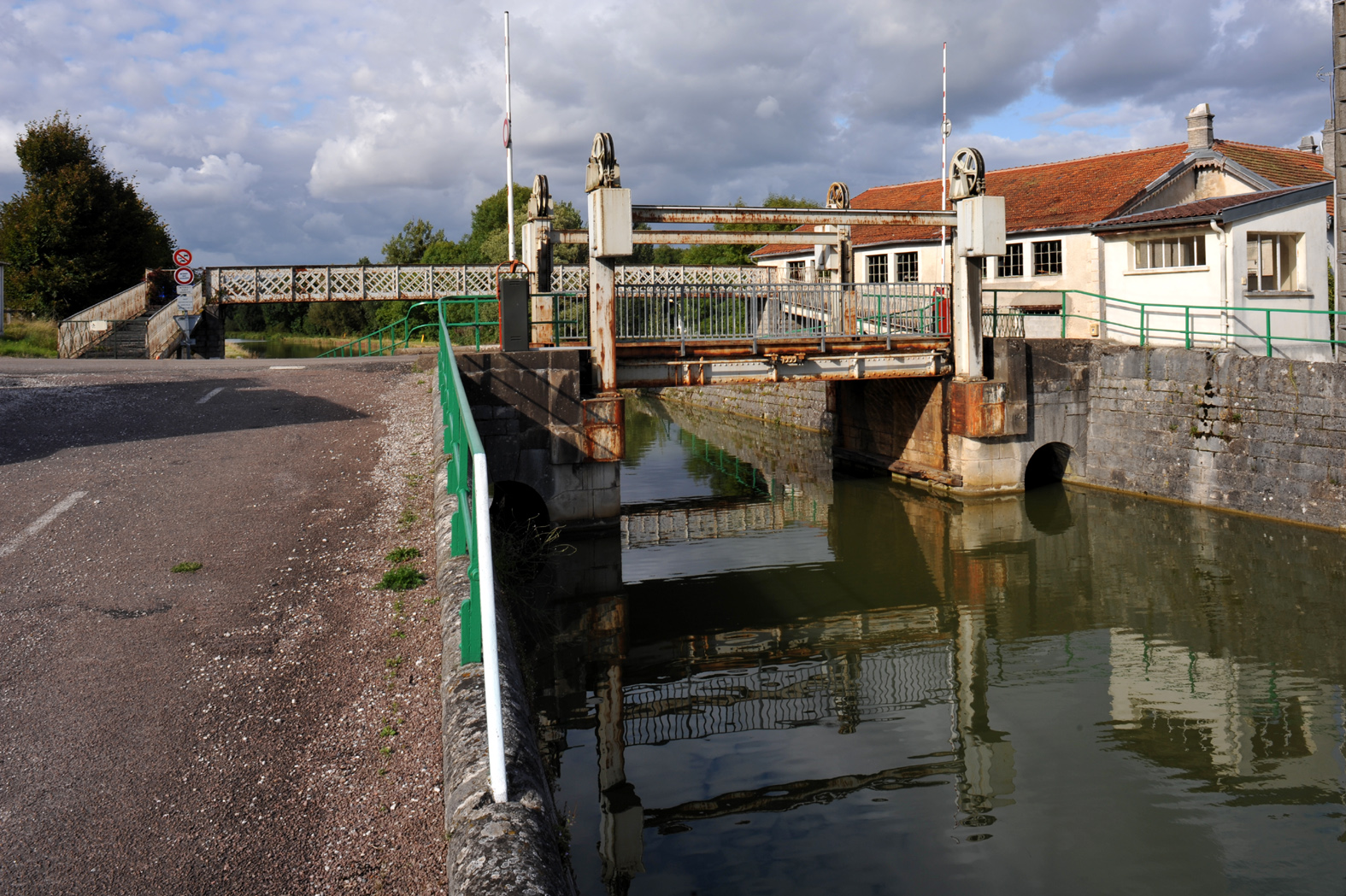
- Lift bridge over the Canal de la Marne à la Saône near Luzy-sur-Marne; Haute-Marne, France.
- Interactive map of Canal entre Champagne et Bourgogne

Specifications
- Length: 224.191 km (139.306 mi)
- Locks: 114

History
- Former names: Canal de la Marne à la Saône
- Construction began: 1880
- Date completed: 1907

Geography
- Start point: Vitry-le-François
- End point: The Saône at Maxilly-sur-Saône
- Beginning coordinates: 48.726944°N 4.595278°E
- Ending coordinates: 47.323611°N 5.434167°E

The Canal entre Champagne et Bourgogne (French pronunciation: [kanal ɑ̃tʁ ʃɑ̃paɲ e buʁɡɔɲ], literally Canal between Champagne and Burgundy), previously named Canal de la Marne à la Saône (French pronunciation: [kanal də la maʁn a la son], literally Canal of the Marne to the Saône), is a canal in north-eastern France connecting the towns of Vitry-le-François and Maxilly-sur-Saône. It is a summit level canal of Freycinet dimensions connecting the Marne and the Saône. It is 224.191 kilometres long, and has 114 locks (71 on the Marne side and 43 on the Saône side) and two tunnels, Condes which is 275 metres long and the tunnel on the summit level between Balesmes-sur-Marne and Noidant-Chatenoy, 4820 metres long. which runs almost exactly underneath the source of the Marne.

The canal is fed by four reservoirs designed for that purpose: lac de Charmes, Lac de la Liez, lac de la Mouche, and Lac de la Vingeanne

- Altitude at Vitry-le-François: 104 m
- Altitude at Maxilly-sur-Saône: 187 m
- Altitude of summit level: 345 m

The canal was recently renamed "Canal entre Champagne et Bourgogne" for the purpose of promoting tourism, but barge skippers often call it the "canal d'Heuilley". This is in reference to Heuilley-sur-Saône, the name of the lock and lock-cut on the Petite-Saône which the canal joins, although the actual junction lies within the neighbouring commune Maxilly-sur-Saône. It is a standard process among bargemen to name the canal after the location where it starts. For example, the Canal Vire-et-Taute in Cotentin was called "canal des Ourmes" the name of its first lock, "les Ormes".

== History ==
Work began on the extension of the old canal of the Haute-Marne in 1880, and the canal opened in 1907, the last to be built of the Freycinet canal network in central France.

== En route ==
- PK 0 Vitry-le-François
- PK 25 Saint-Dizier
- PK 57 Autigny-le-Grand
- PK 72 Donjeux
- PK 109.4 Chaumont
- PK 152.5 beginning of summit level
- PK 155-160 Balesmes tunnel
- PK 163 end of summit level
- PK 222.5 Maxilly-sur-Saône
- PK 224 Ends at the right-angle junction with the Heuilley lock-cut on the Petite Saône

== See also ==
- List of canals in France
