= Blagny-sur-Vingeanne =

- Commune
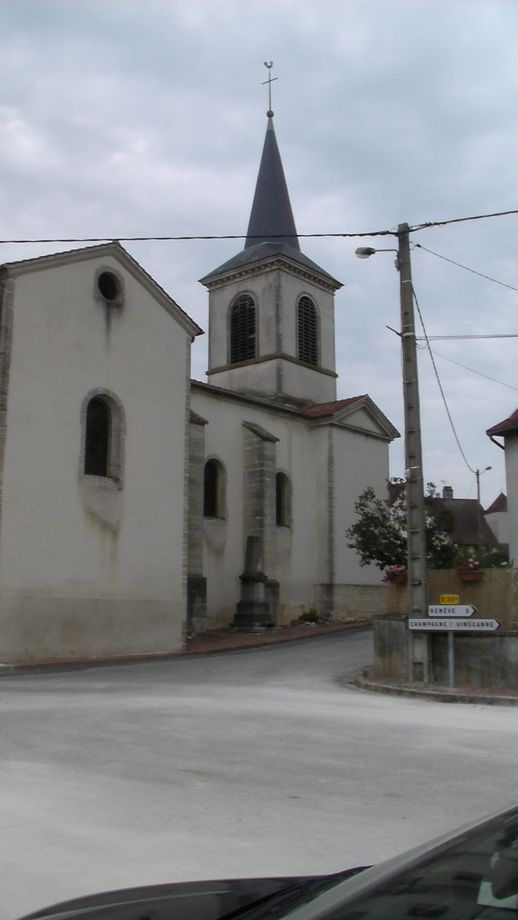
- The church in Blagny-sur-Vingeanne

- Coat of arms
- Location of Blagny-sur-Vingeanne
- Location within France Location within Bourgogne-Franche-Comté
- Coordinates: 47°26′20″N 5°22′11″E
- Country: France
- Region: Bourgogne-Franche-Comté
- Department: Côte-d'Or
- Arrondissement: Dijon
- Canton: Saint-Apollinaire

Government
  - Mayor (2020–2026): Marie-Françoise Collinet
- Area^{1}: 7.56 km^{2} (2.92 sq mi)
- Elevation: 219 m (719 ft)
- Highest elevation: 254 m (833 ft)
- Lowest elevation: 200 m (660 ft)
- Population (2023): 122
  - Density: 16.1/km^{2} (41.8/sq mi)
- Time zone: UTC+01:00 (CET)
  - Summer (DST): UTC+02:00 (CEST)
- INSEE/Postal code: 21079 /21310
- ^{1} French Land Register data, which excludes lakes, ponds, glaciers > 1 km^{2} (0.386 sq mi or 247 acres) and river estuaries.

Blagny-sur-Vingeanne (French pronunciation: [blaɲi syʁ vɛ̃ʒan]) is a commune in the Côte-d'Or department in eastern France.

The Vingeanne river runs through the commune.

== Population ==
Historical population
Year	Pop.	±% p.a.
1968	133	—
1975	117	−1.81%
1982	119	+0.24%
1990	122	+0.31%
1999	109	−1.24%
2007	126	+1.83%
2012	149	+3.41%
2017	132	−2.39%
2023	122	−1.30%
Source: INSEE

== See also ==
- Communes of the Côte-d'Or department
