= Saint-Seine-sur-Vingeanne =

- Commune
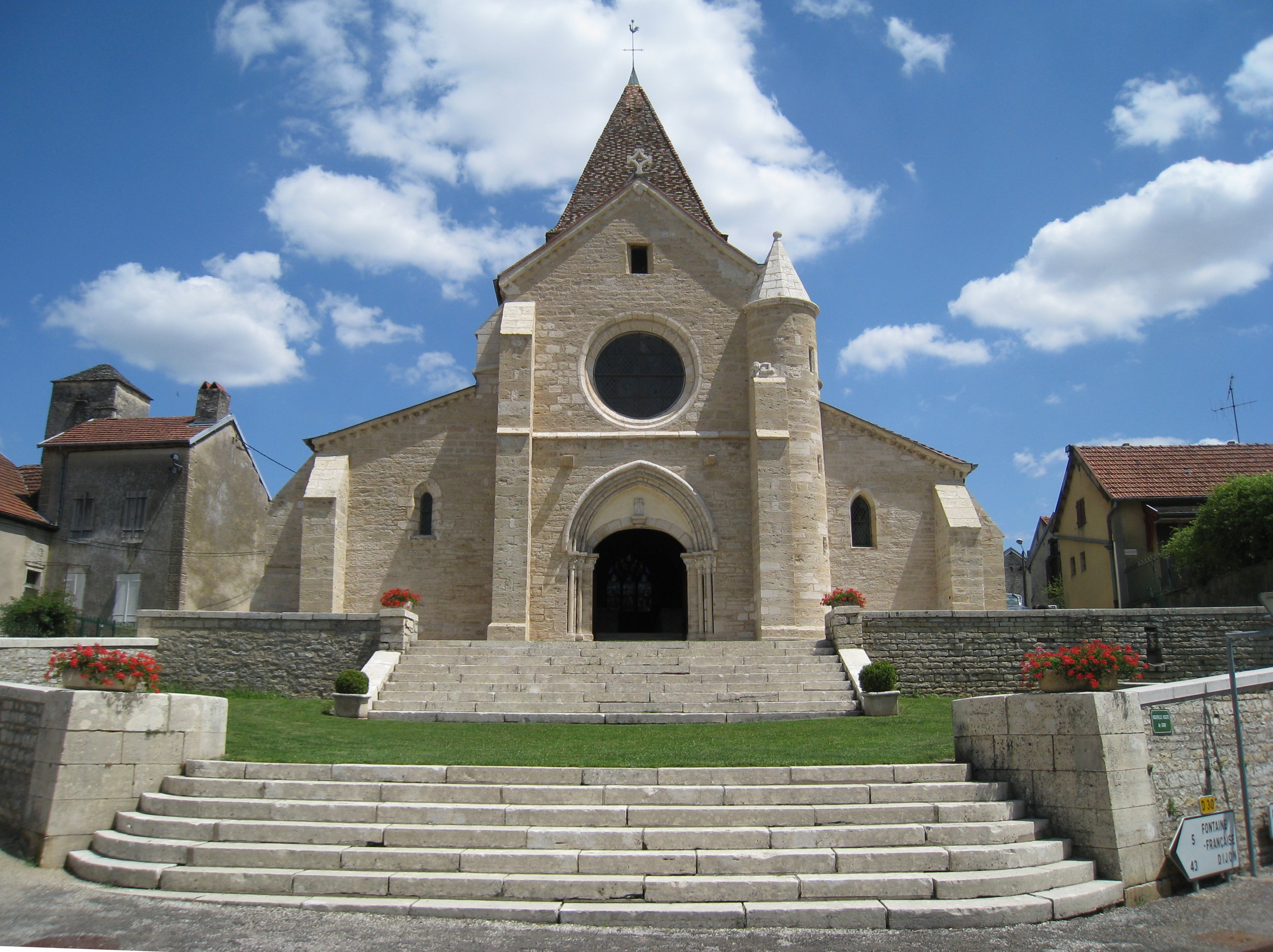
- The church in Saint-Seine-sur-Vingeanne

- Coat of arms
- Location of Saint-Seine-sur-Vingeanne
- Location within France Location within Bourgogne-Franche-Comté
- Coordinates: 47°31′25″N 5°25′50″E
- Country: France
- Region: Bourgogne-Franche-Comté
- Department: Côte-d'Or
- Arrondissement: Dijon
- Canton: Saint-Apollinaire

Government
  - Mayor (2020–2026): Christian Charlot
- Area^{1}: 18.69 km^{2} (7.22 sq mi)
- Highest elevation: 288 m (945 ft)
- Lowest elevation: 218 m (715 ft)
- Population (2023): 371
  - Density: 19.9/km^{2} (51.4/sq mi)
- Time zone: UTC+01:00 (CET)
  - Summer (DST): UTC+02:00 (CEST)
- INSEE/Postal code: 21574 /21610
- ^{1} French Land Register data, which excludes lakes, ponds, glaciers > 1 km^{2} (0.386 sq mi or 247 acres) and river estuaries.

Saint-Seine-sur-Vingeanne (French pronunciation: [sɛ̃ sɛn syʁ vɛ̃ʒan], literally Saint-Seine on Vingeanne) is a commune in the Côte-d'Or department in eastern France.

The Vingeanne river runs through the commune.

== Population ==
Historical population
Year	Pop.	±% p.a.
1968	291	—
1975	257	−1.76%
1982	275	+0.97%
1990	271	−0.18%
1999	286	+0.60%
2007	354	+2.70%
2012	415	+3.23%
2017	393	−1.08%
2023	371	−0.96%
Source: INSEE

== See also ==
- Communes of the Côte-d'Or department
