= Oisilly =

- Commune
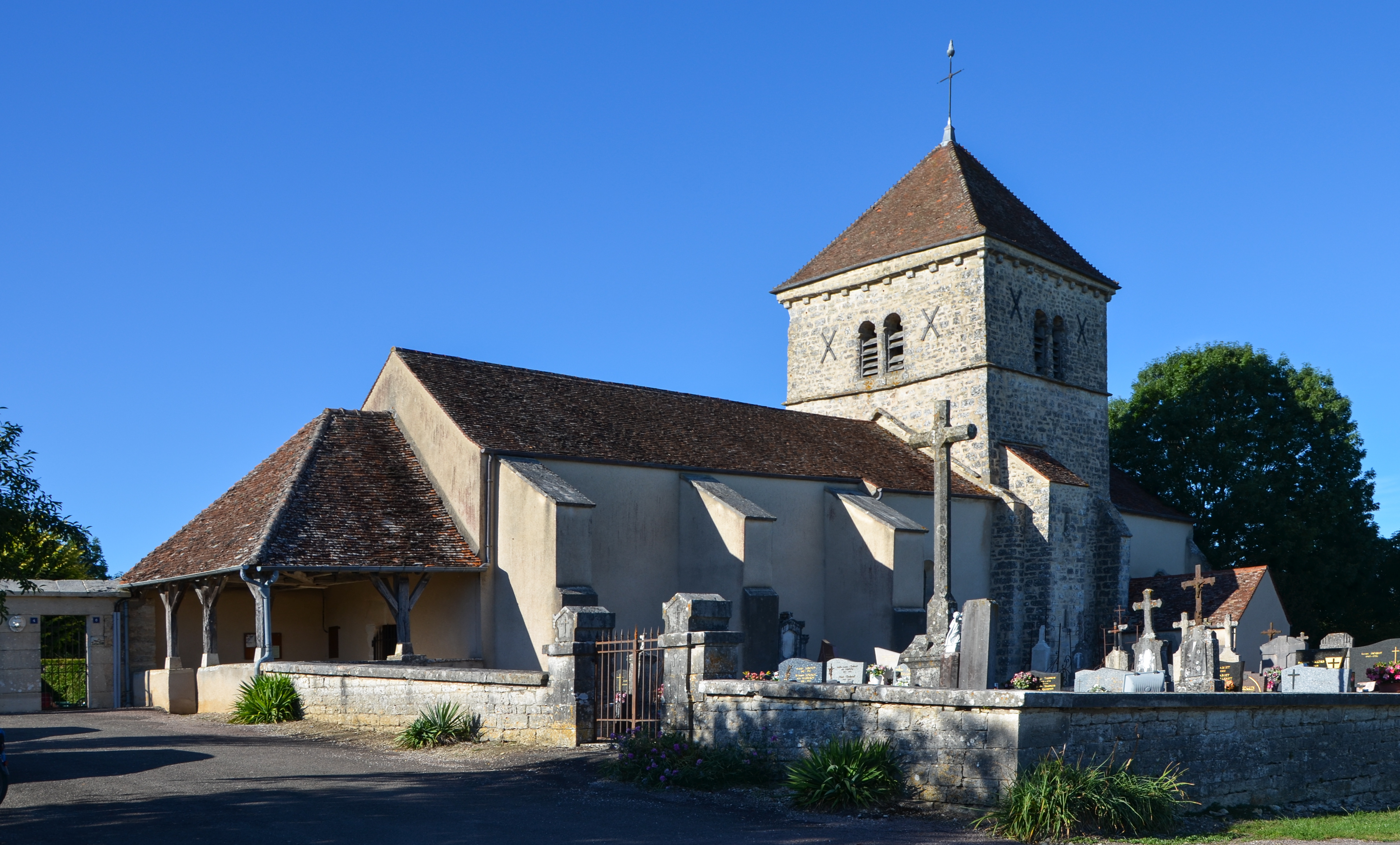
- The church in Oisilly
- Location of Oisilly
- Location within France Location within Bourgogne-Franche-Comté
- Coordinates: 47°25′17″N 5°22′00″E
- Country: France
- Region: Bourgogne-Franche-Comté
- Department: Côte-d'Or
- Arrondissement: Dijon
- Canton: Saint-Apollinaire

Government
  - Mayor (2024–2026): Robert Roblot
- Area^{1}: 5.97 km^{2} (2.31 sq mi)
- Elevation: 219 m (719 ft)
- Highest elevation: 238 m (781 ft)
- Lowest elevation: 197 m (646 ft)
- Population (2023): 127
  - Density: 21.3/km^{2} (55.1/sq mi)
- Time zone: UTC+01:00 (CET)
  - Summer (DST): UTC+02:00 (CEST)
- INSEE/Postal code: 21467 /21310
- ^{1} French Land Register data, which excludes lakes, ponds, glaciers > 1 km^{2} (0.386 sq mi or 247 acres) and river estuaries.

Oisilly (French pronunciation: [waziji]) is a commune in the Côte-d'Or department in eastern France.

== Population ==
Historical population
Year	Pop.	±% p.a.
1968	104	—
1975	88	−2.36%
1982	96	+1.25%
1990	116	+2.39%
1999	108	−0.79%
2007	134	+2.73%
2012	136	+0.30%
2017	129	−1.05%
2023	127	−0.26%
Source: INSEE

== See also ==
- Communes of the Côte-d'Or department
