= Heuilley-Cotton =

- Part of Villegusien-le-Lac
- Location of Heuilley-Cotton
- Location within France Location within Grand Est
- Coordinates: 47°46′27″N 5°21′59″E
- Country: France
- Region: Grand Est
- Department: Haute-Marne
- Arrondissement: Langres
- Canton: Villegusien-le-Lac
- Commune: Villegusien-le-Lac
- Area^{1}: 10.09 km^{2} (3.90 sq mi)
- Elevation: 350 m (1,150 ft)
- Highest elevation: 407 m (1,335 ft)
- Lowest elevation: 310 m (1,020 ft)
- Population (2022): 264
  - Density: 26.2/km^{2} (67.8/sq mi)
- Time zone: UTC+01:00 (CET)
  - Summer (DST): UTC+02:00 (CEST)
- Postal code: 52600
- ^{1} French Land Register data, which excludes lakes, ponds, glaciers > 1 km^{2} (0.386 sq mi or 247 acres) and river estuaries.

Heuilley-Cotton (French pronunciation: [œjɛ kɔtɔ̃]) is a former commune in the Haute-Marne department in north-eastern France. On 1 January 2016, it was merged into the commune Villegusien-le-Lac. Its population was 264 in 2022.

== See also ==
- Communes of the Haute-Marne department
