= Maxilly-sur-Saône =

- Commune
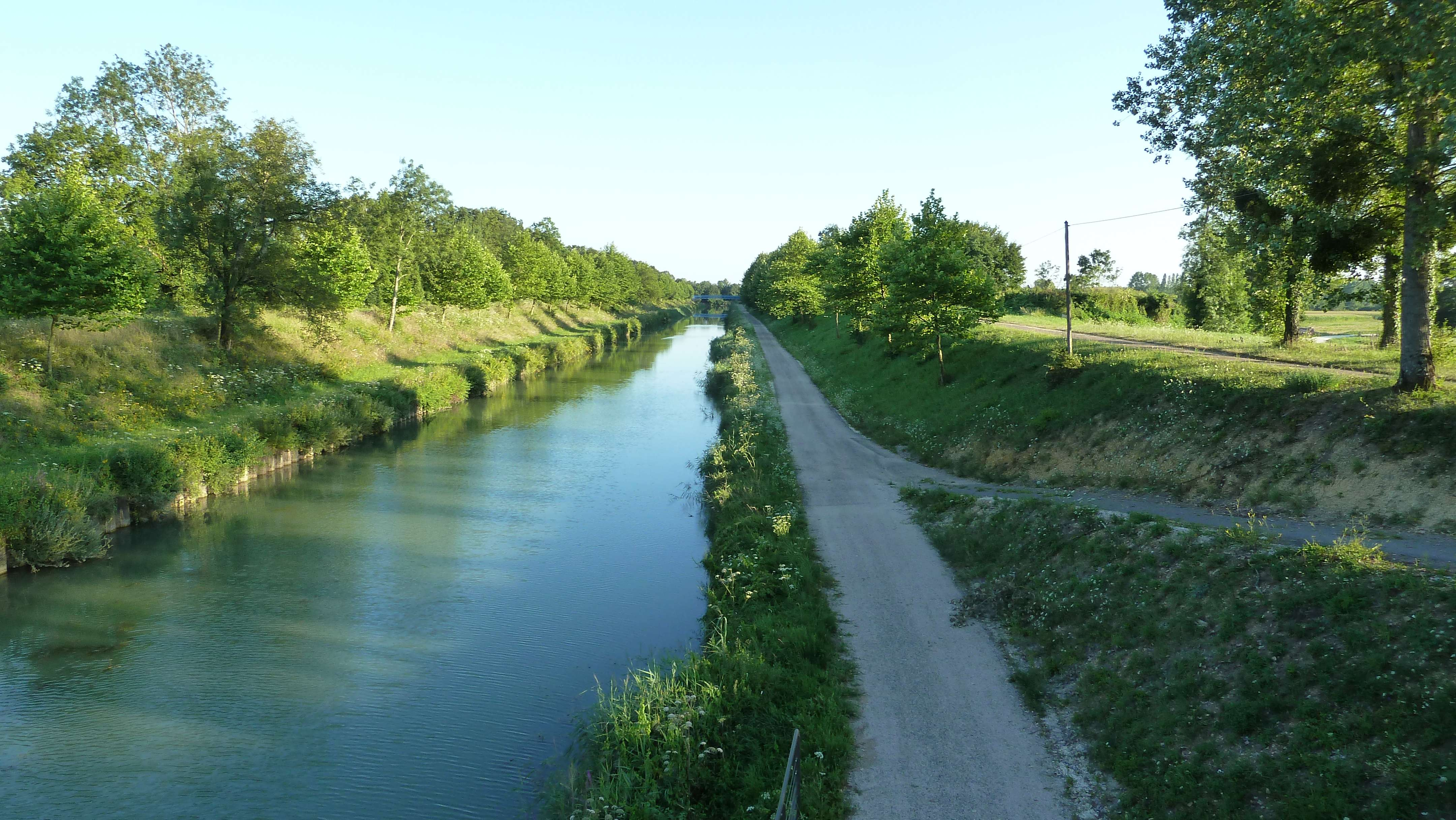
- The Saône Canal at Maxilly-sur-Saône

- Coat of arms
- Location of Maxilly-sur-Saône
- Location within France Location within Bourgogne-Franche-Comté
- Coordinates: 47°20′05″N 5°25′42″E
- Country: France
- Region: Bourgogne-Franche-Comté
- Department: Côte-d'Or
- Arrondissement: Dijon
- Canton: Auxonne

Government
  - Mayor (2020–2026): Alain Dunet
- Area^{1}: 7.87 km^{2} (3.04 sq mi)
- Elevation: 186 m (610 ft)
- Highest elevation: 236 m (774 ft)
- Lowest elevation: 183 m (600 ft)
- Population (2023): 364
  - Density: 46.3/km^{2} (120/sq mi)
- Time zone: UTC+01:00 (CET)
  - Summer (DST): UTC+02:00 (CEST)
- INSEE/Postal code: 21398 /21270
- ^{1} French Land Register data, which excludes lakes, ponds, glaciers > 1 km^{2} (0.386 sq mi or 247 acres) and river estuaries.

Maxilly-sur-Saône is a commune in the Côte-d'Or department in the Bourgogne-Franche-Comté region in eastern France. The inhabitants are called Maximilliens and Maximilliennes.

== Geography ==
Located a few kilometers from the Haute-Saône, Maxilly-sur-Saône is crossed by a canal which connects the River Marne to the Saône.

== Town planning ==
=== Typology ===
Maxilly-sur-Saône is classified as a rural municipality, because it is part of the a category of municipalities with a low or very low population density, as defined by the municipal density grid of the Institut national de la statistique et des études économiques.

In addition, Maxilly-sur-Saôn is part of the attraction area of Dijon, of which it is a municipality in the crown. This area, which includes 333 municipalities, is categorized in areas of 200,000 to less than 700,000 inhabitants.

The zoning of the municipality, as reflected in the database European occupation biophysical soil Corine Land Cover (CLC), is marked by the importance of the agricultural land (59.6% in 2018), a proportion roughly equivalent to that of 1990 (59.1%). The detailed breakdown in 2018 is as follows:

- forests (30.7%)
- meadows (29%)
- arable land (18.2%)
- heterogeneous agricultural areas (12.4%)
- urbanized areas (7.1%)
- inland waters (2.3%)
- industrial or commercial zones and communication networks (0.5%).

The Institut national de l'information géographique et forestière also provides an online tool to compare the evolution over time of land use in the municipality (or in territories at different scales). Several eras are accessible as aerial maps or photos: the Cassini map (18th century), the map of Staff (1820–1866) and the current period (1950 to present).

== Points of interest ==
Maxilly-sur-Saône is home to a Lock where the canal from the Marne to the Saône ends (or begins). Saint-Martin Parish church can also be found in the commune.

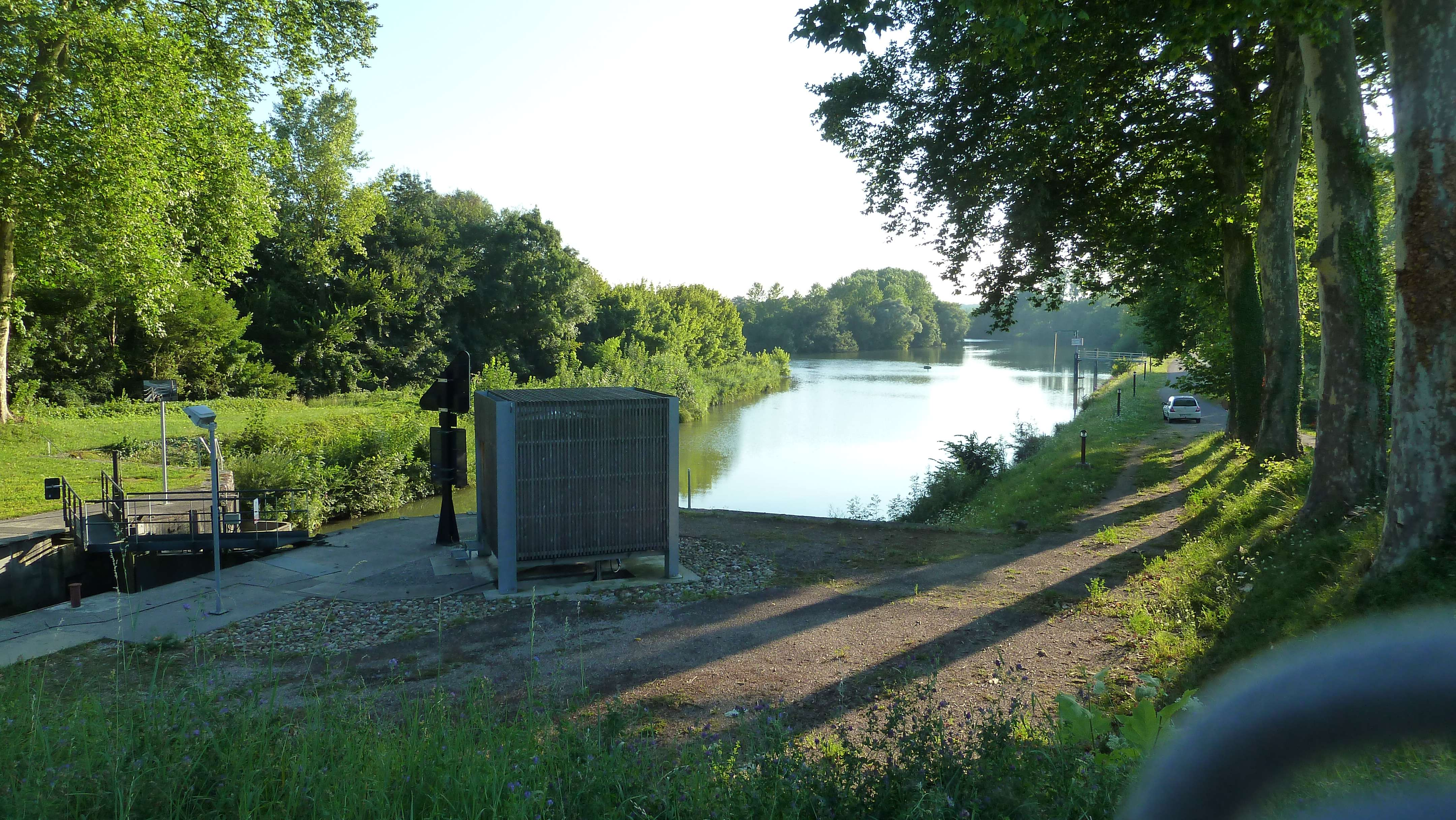
Lock at Tremblant in Maxilly sur Saône

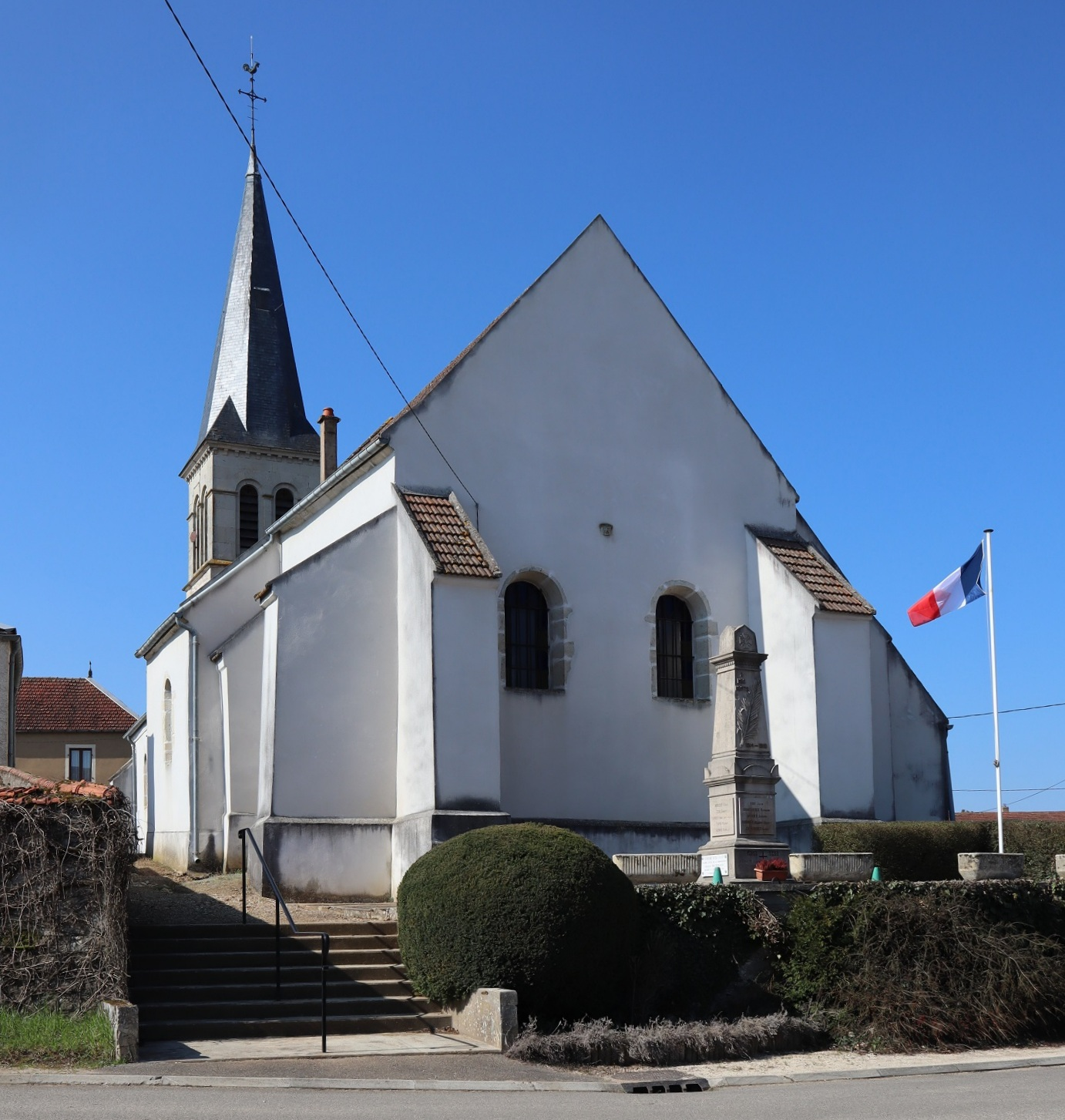
Saint-Martin Parish church

== Population ==
Historical population
Year	Pop.	±% p.a.
1968	296	—
1975	340	+2.00%
1982	298	−1.87%
1990	300	+0.08%
1999	301	+0.04%
2007	301	+0.00%
2012	347	+2.89%
2017	348	+0.06%
2023	364	+0.75%
Source: INSEE

== See also ==
- Communes of the Côte-d'Or department
