= Villegusien-le-Lac =

- Commune
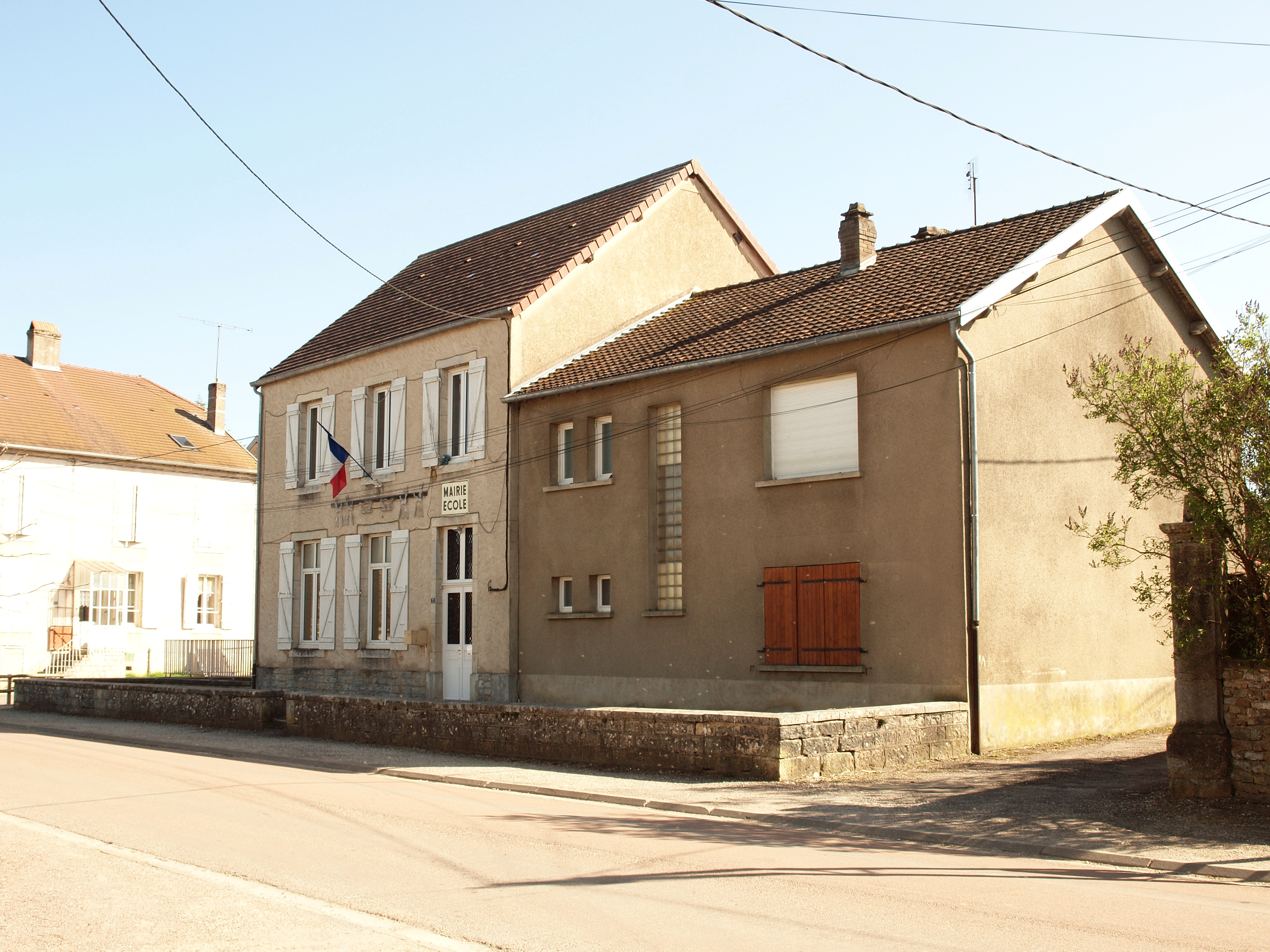
- The town hall in Villegusien-le-Lac
- Location of Villegusien-le-Lac
- Location within France Location within Grand Est
- Coordinates: 47°44′13″N 5°19′14″E
- Country: France
- Region: Grand Est
- Department: Haute-Marne
- Arrondissement: Langres
- Canton: Villegusien-le-Lac
- Intercommunality: Auberive Vingeanne et Montsaugeonnais

Government
  - Mayor (2020–2026): Magali Cartagena
- Area^{1}: 40.03 km^{2} (15.46 sq mi)
- Elevation: 312 m (1,024 ft)
- Highest elevation: 460 m (1,510 ft)
- Lowest elevation: 279 m (915 ft)
- Population (2023): 1,000
  - Density: 25/km^{2} (65/sq mi)
- Time zone: UTC+01:00 (CET)
  - Summer (DST): UTC+02:00 (CEST)
- INSEE/Postal code: 52529 /52190
- ^{1} French Land Register data, which excludes lakes, ponds, glaciers > 1 km^{2} (0.386 sq mi or 247 acres) and river estuaries.

Villegusien-le-Lac (French pronunciation: [vilɡyzjɛ̃ lə lak]) is a commune in the Haute-Marne department in north-eastern France. On 1 January 2016, the former commune Heuilley-Cotton was merged into Villegusien-le-Lac. It is around 50 km north of Dijon.

== See also ==
- Communes of the Haute-Marne department
