= Cheuge =

- Commune
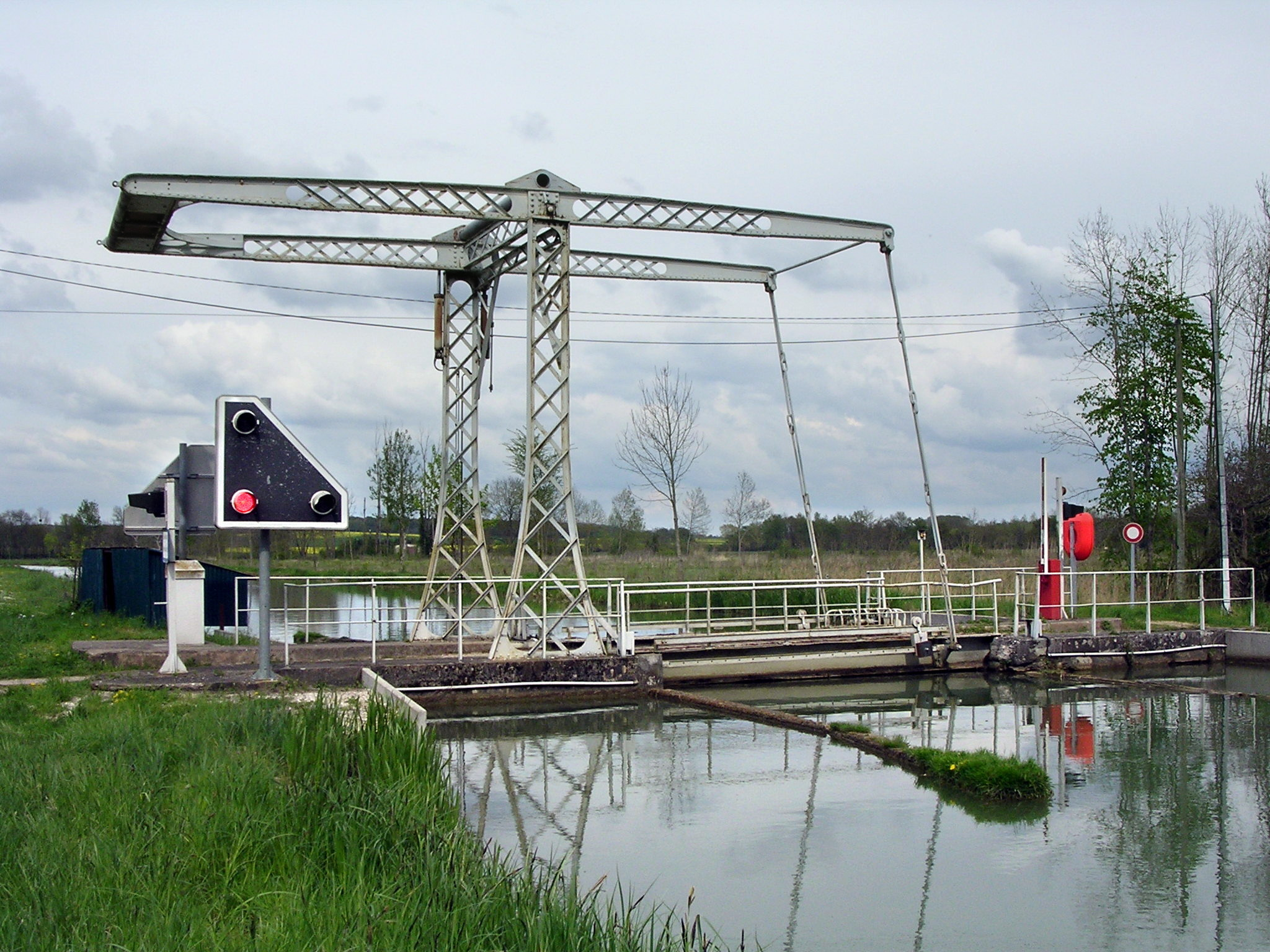
- The lift bridge over the Marne Canal
- Location of Cheuge
- Location within France Location within Bourgogne-Franche-Comté
- Coordinates: 47°23′29″N 5°23′37″E
- Country: France
- Region: Bourgogne-Franche-Comté
- Department: Côte-d'Or
- Arrondissement: Dijon
- Canton: Saint-Apollinaire

Government
  - Mayor (2020–2026): Michel Marotel
- Area^{1}: 8.88 km^{2} (3.43 sq mi)
- Elevation: 199 m (653 ft)
- Highest elevation: 242 m (794 ft)
- Lowest elevation: 193 m (633 ft)
- Population (2023): 122
  - Density: 13.7/km^{2} (35.6/sq mi)
- Time zone: UTC+01:00 (CET)
  - Summer (DST): UTC+02:00 (CEST)
- INSEE/Postal code: 21167 /21310
- ^{1} French Land Register data, which excludes lakes, ponds, glaciers > 1 km^{2} (0.386 sq mi or 247 acres) and river estuaries.

Cheuge (French pronunciation: [ʃœʒ]) is a commune in the Côte-d'Or department in eastern France. The 1971 movie The Widow Couderc was filmed in the region, and featured houses both sides of the lift bridge over the Marne Canal.

== Population ==
Historical population
Year	Pop.	±% p.a.
1968	59	—
1975	73	+3.09%
1982	113	+6.44%
1990	127	+1.47%
1999	115	−1.10%
2007	106	−1.01%
2012	118	+2.17%
2017	126	+1.32%
2023	122	−0.54%
Source: INSEE

== See also ==
- Communes of the Côte-d'Or department
