= Heuilley-sur-Saône =

- Commune
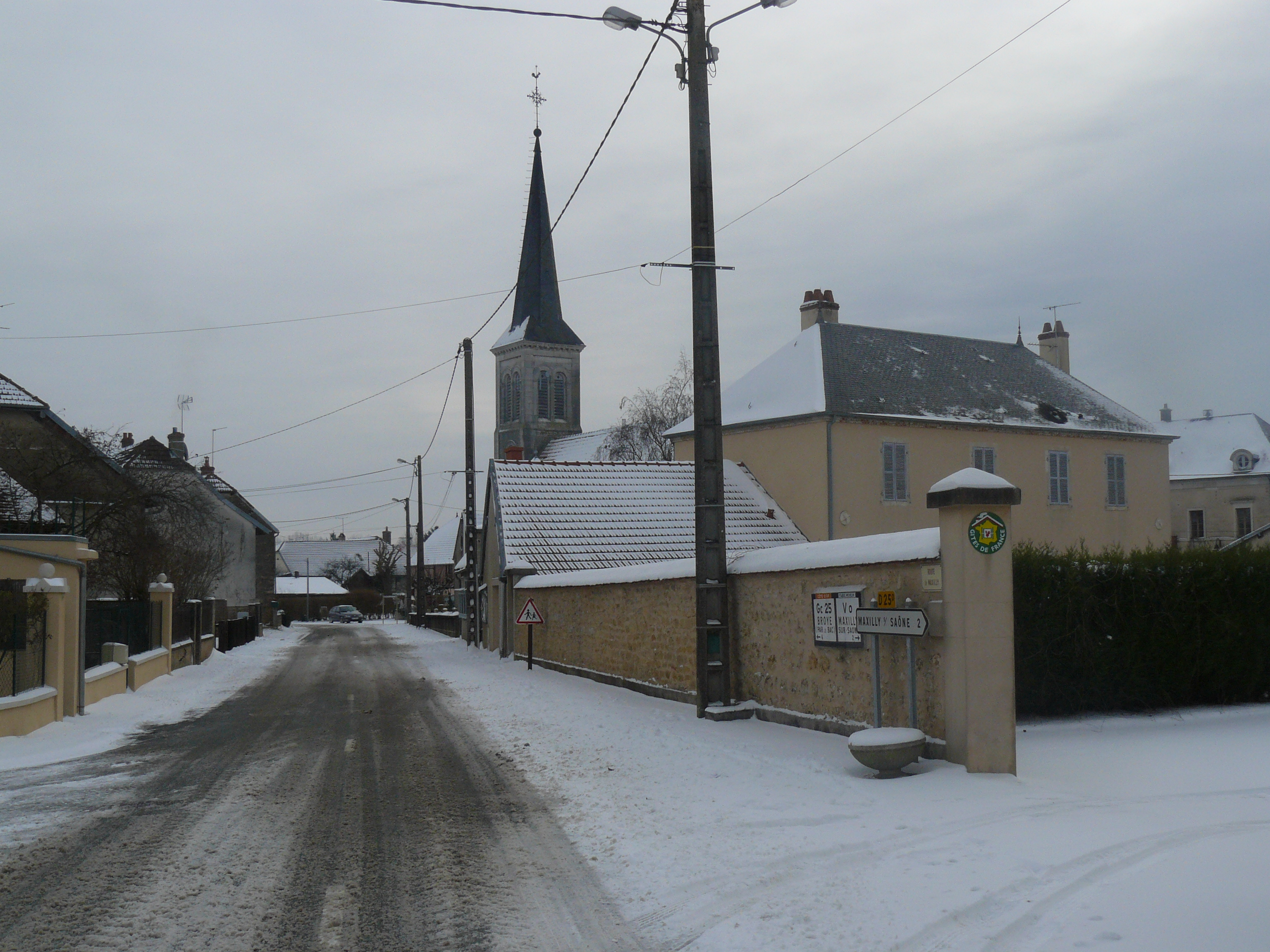
- The village in the snow, during December 2009

- Coat of arms
- Location of Heuilley-sur-Saône
- Location within France Location within Bourgogne-Franche-Comté
- Coordinates: 47°19′50″N 5°27′21″E
- Country: France
- Region: Bourgogne-Franche-Comté
- Department: Côte-d'Or
- Arrondissement: Dijon
- Canton: Auxonne

Government
  - Mayor (2020–2026): Florence Moussard
- Area^{1}: 9.78 km^{2} (3.78 sq mi)
- Elevation: 190 m (620 ft)
- Highest elevation: 193 m (633 ft)
- Lowest elevation: 183 m (600 ft)
- Population (2023): 345
  - Density: 35.3/km^{2} (91.4/sq mi)
- Time zone: UTC+01:00 (CET)
  - Summer (DST): UTC+02:00 (CEST)
- INSEE/Postal code: 21316 /21270
- ^{1} French Land Register data, which excludes lakes, ponds, glaciers > 1 km^{2} (0.386 sq mi or 247 acres) and river estuaries.

Heuilley-sur-Saône (French pronunciation: [œjɛ syʁ son], literally Heuilley on Saône) is a commune in the Côte-d'Or department in eastern France.

== Population ==
Historical population
Year	Pop.	±% p.a.
1968	331	—
1975	303	−1.25%
1982	267	−1.79%
1990	266	−0.05%
1999	296	+1.19%
2007	298	+0.08%
2012	320	+1.43%
2017	333	+0.80%
2023	345	+0.59%
Source: INSEE

== See also ==
- Communes of the Côte-d'Or department
