= Choye =

- Part of Colombine
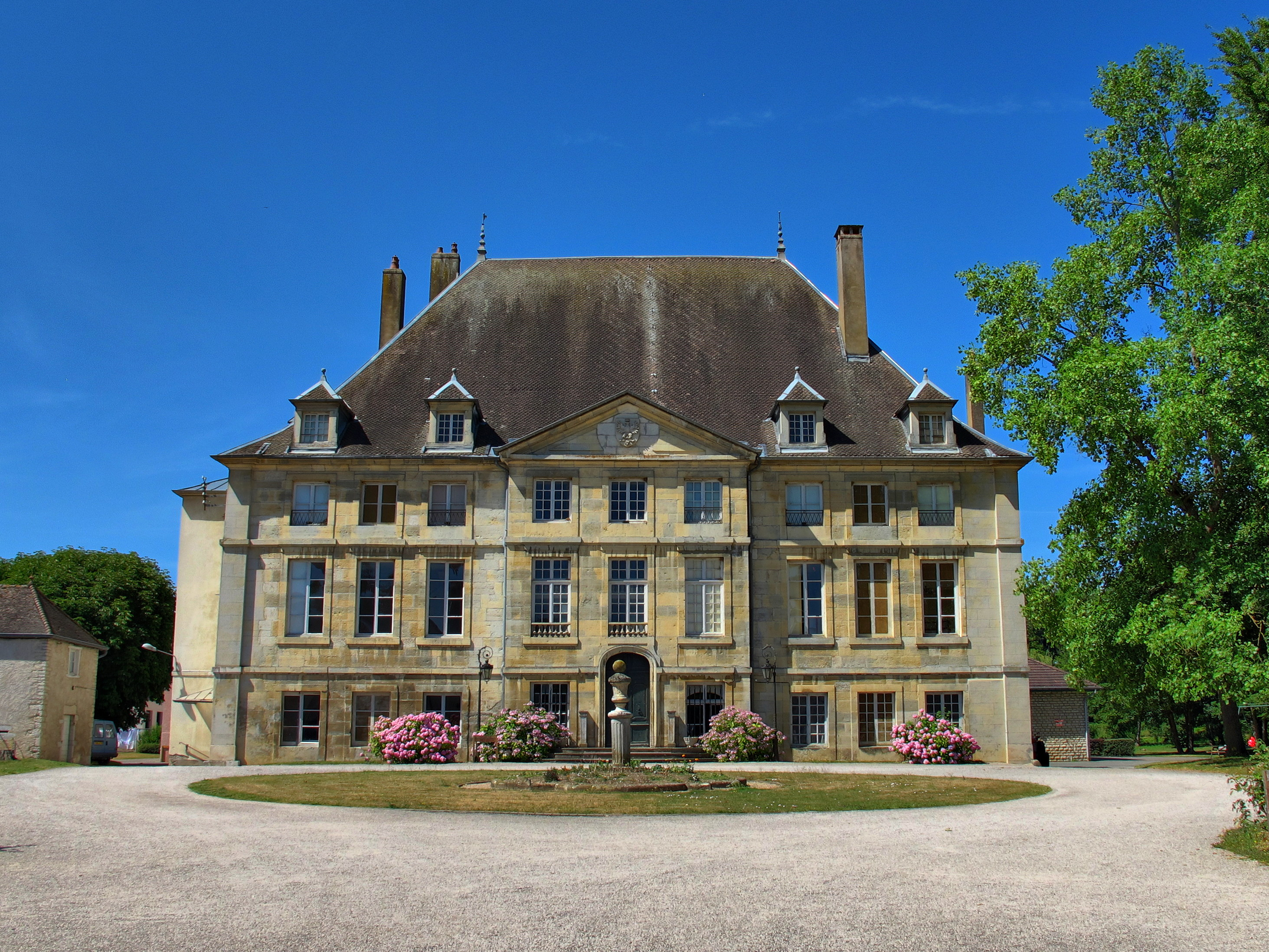
- The chateau in Choye

- Coat of arms
- Location of Choye
- Location within France Location within Bourgogne-Franche-Comté
- Coordinates: 47°23′31″N 5°45′38″E
- Country: France
- Region: Bourgogne-Franche-Comté
- Department: Haute-Saône
- Arrondissement: Vesoul
- Canton: Marnay
- Commune: Colombine
- Area^{1}: 14.40 km^{2} (5.56 sq mi)
- Highest elevation: 280 m (920 ft)
- Lowest elevation: 197 m (646 ft)
- Population (2022): 475
  - Density: 33.0/km^{2} (85.4/sq mi)
- Time zone: UTC+01:00 (CET)
  - Summer (DST): UTC+02:00 (CEST)
- Postal code: 70700
- ^{1} French Land Register data, which excludes lakes, ponds, glaciers > 1 km^{2} (0.386 sq mi or 247 acres) and river estuaries.

Choye is a former commune in the Haute-Saône department in the region of Bourgogne-Franche-Comté in eastern France. It was merged with Villefrancon to form Colombine on 1 January 2025.

== See also ==
- Communes of the Haute-Saône department
