= Colombine, Haute-Saône =

Colombine
- Commune
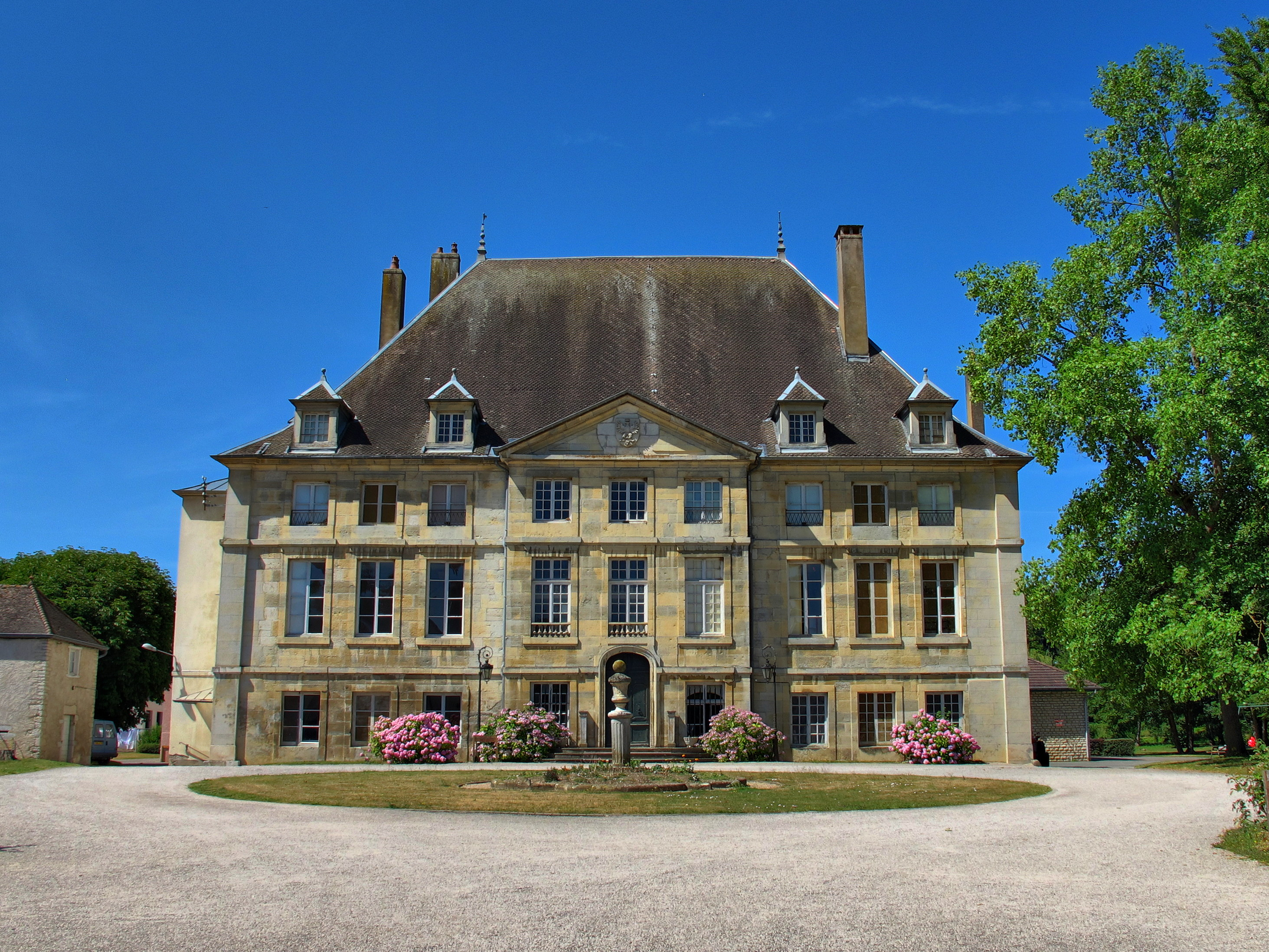
- Château de Choye
- Location of Colombine
- Location within France Location within Bourgogne-Franche-Comté
- Coordinates: 47°23′28″N 5°45′35″E
- Country: France
- Region: Bourgogne-Franche-Comté
- Department: Haute-Saône
- Arrondissement: Vesoul
- Canton: Marnay
- Area^{1}: 20.05 km^{2} (7.74 sq mi)
- Population (2023): 605
  - Density: 30.2/km^{2} (78.2/sq mi)
- Time zone: UTC+01:00 (CET)
  - Summer (DST): UTC+02:00 (CEST)
- INSEE/Postal code: 70152 /70700
- ^{1} French Land Register data, which excludes lakes, ponds, glaciers > 1 km^{2} (0.386 sq mi or 247 acres) and river estuaries.

Colombine (French pronunciation: [kɔlɔ̃bin]; named after the stream with the same name) is a commune in the Haute-Saône department in the region of Bourgogne-Franche-Comté in eastern France. It was formed on 1 January 2025, with the merger of Choye and Villefrancon.

== See also ==
- Communes of the Haute-Saône department
