= Saint-Louis Coal Mine =

Coal mine in Champagney, France

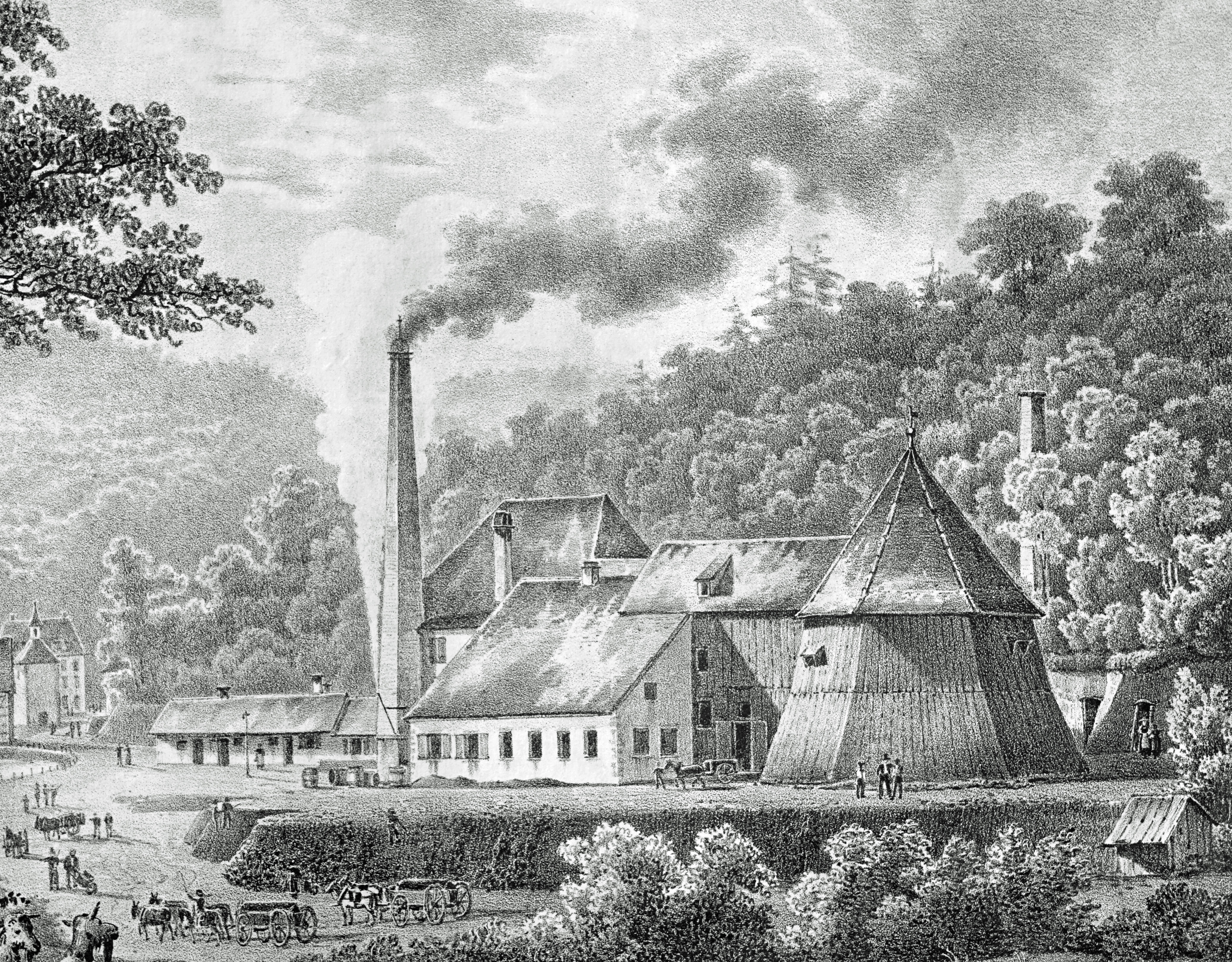
- Depiction of the Saint-Louis shaft circa 1826.

- Location within Bourgogne-Franche-Comté
- Location: Champagney commune, Haute-Saône department, Bourgogne-Franche-Comté region, France; 47°42′25″N 06°39′13″E
- Products: Coal
- Type: Coal mine
- Greatest depth: 135 m (443 ft)
- Discovered: 1810
- Opened: 1823
- Closed: 1840 (extraction) 1842 (ventilation)
- Company: Ronchamp coal mines

The Saint-Louis Coal Mine (nicknamed the "Grand Puits") is one of the main shafts at the Ronchamp coal mines in the Bourgogne-Franche-Comté region of France. Located in the hamlet of La Houillère, in the commune of Champagney, it was the first real mine shaft to be dug in the Ronchamp coalfield. It was the most productive coal mine in the Ronchamp coalfield during the first half of the 19th century. On 10 April 1824, this shaft also experienced the first firedamp explosion in the coalfield, which killed twenty people and injured sixteen others. Later, on 31 May 1830, a second, even more deadly, firedamp explosion killed twenty-eight people. The pit was finally abandoned and backfilled in 1842. A mining estate was built next to the pit in the 1850s.

After closure, one of the buildings was preserved as a casino and ballroom before being demolished in the 1980s. At the beginning of the 21st century, almost no trace of the facilities remains, and the shaft is now under a pavilion at the foot of a hill. A decorative monument built in 2012 is a reminder of the site's mining past.

== Excavation ==
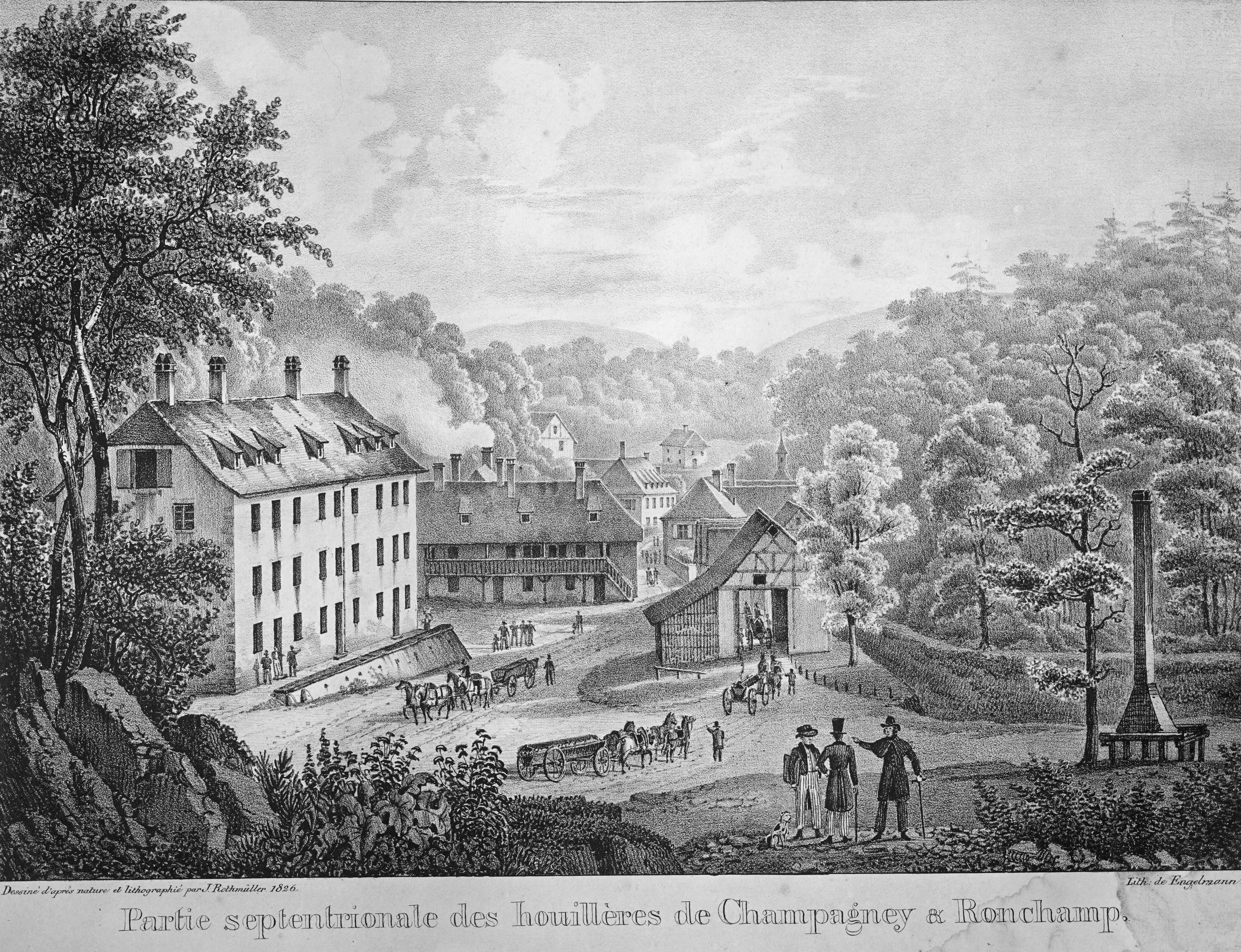
La Houillère hamlet in 1826.

Excavation of the Saint-Louis shaft began in 1810 using a horse engine, to the south of the hamlet of La Houillère, which was then the centre of coal mining in Ronchamp. It has a sixteen-metre-high wooden casing made watertight with hemp oakum. Its opening is rectangular in cross-section, 4.25 meters long and 2.30 meters wide, and it is equipped with two compartments, one for extraction and the other for dewatering and ventilation.

In 1819, the first ever steam engine was installed in a shaft at Ronchamp, capable of lifting 400 skips a day. It was an English engine with a pendulum, condenser, low-pressure piston 0.45 meters in diameter and 10 bhp; it was manufactured in Mr. Rottewel's workshops in Boston. In addition to the extraction coil, this machine operated two sets of 0.19-meter-diameter pumps. In October 1823, the Saint-Louis shaft cut through the first layer of the Stephanian coalfield at around 90 meters from the surface, with drilling stopped at 100 meters. Reaching this depth for the first time in the Ronchamp coalfield, it was nicknamed the "great shaft".

The Henri IV shaft, excavated a few hundred meters north of the Saint-Louis shaft from 1815, reached the second layer of coal on 12 May 1823. It was then connected to the Saint-Louis shaft to serve as a ventilation and drainage shaft; the water was discharged at the level of the large drainage channel and extracted from the tunnels by hand pumps, then by ox-drawn pumps during the day. These pumps operated at a rate of twelve to fifteen pulses per minute, with a flow rate of 1.5 litres per piston stroke. Finally, other hand pumps were used to convey the water to the gully.

== Explotation ==
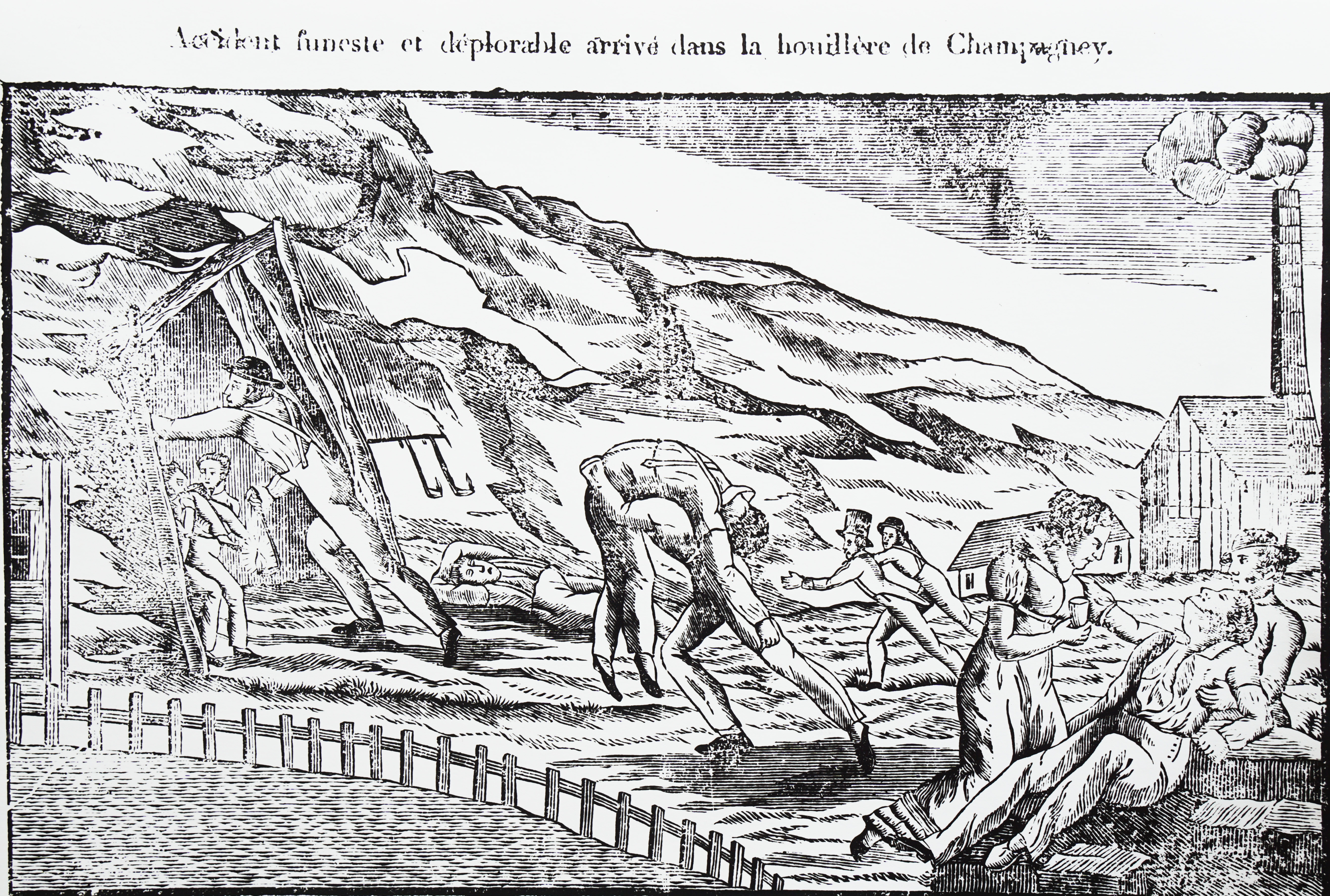
The 1824 catastrophe.

In April 1824, research work was carried out to the north of the shaft, not far from the Basvent gallery, in rugged terrain. A strong release of firedamp appeared, which was mitigated by the installation of a fan and ventilation pipes. However, this system proved ineffective and the gas became lodged in workings that had been abandoned for two years, 50 meters from the shaft.

On 10 April 1824, the first explosion due to firedamp occurred in the Ronchamp coalfield. Twenty people died, including a steiger, and sixteen were injured, more or less seriously, and the workings were destroyed. This tragedy was significant for the local population not only because it was the first accident of its kind, but also because it claimed so many victims. The explosion that caused this accident had originated in a reconnaissance site located near a fault, where the gas had accumulated despite a slight release. The year after the explosion, the Mining Administration decided to implement the first Davy primitive safety lamp.

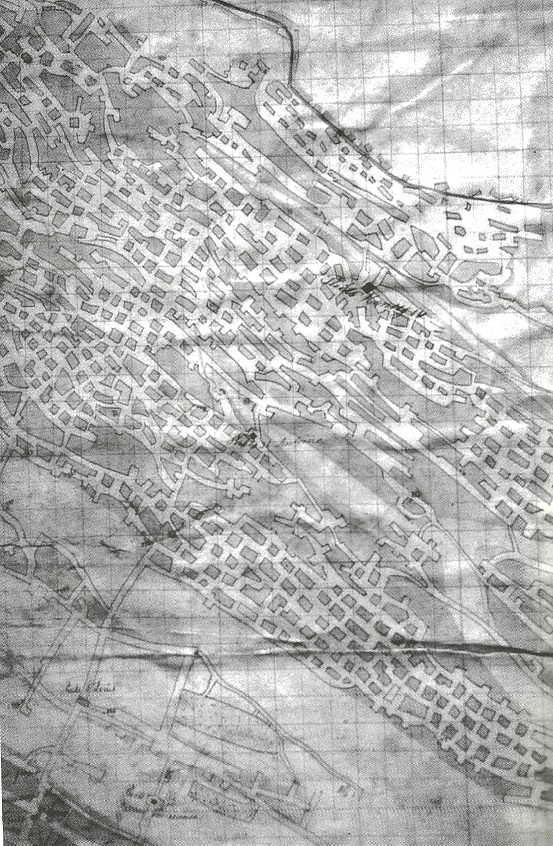
Map of the mine underground.

In 1827, a strong influx of water invaded the shaft from the Clocher and Cheval galleries. A 24-hp steam engine was installed to remove 400 skips a day, or 270 m^{3} of water. A new 48 hp engine, of the same type as the old one, was installed in July of the same year to operate four pumps delivering 375 m^{3} of water per day. It also drove the reel on which the extraction cables were wound (at the time, the reels had a capacity of 400 kg, and were an Anzin model). The cages were wound onto a tray attached directly to the cable. The cages are guided but without a clutch fork.

Water infiltration at the bottom of the tunnels became too serious to be removed with skips and had to be held back by barrages that had to withstand 50 meters of water. These dams finally broke in the spring of 1828, rendering the mine inaccessible, as it was flooded to a depth of 13 meters above the upper receipt. Pumps and a new 20 hp steam engine had to be installed before the workings could be dewatered and work resumed at the end of the year.

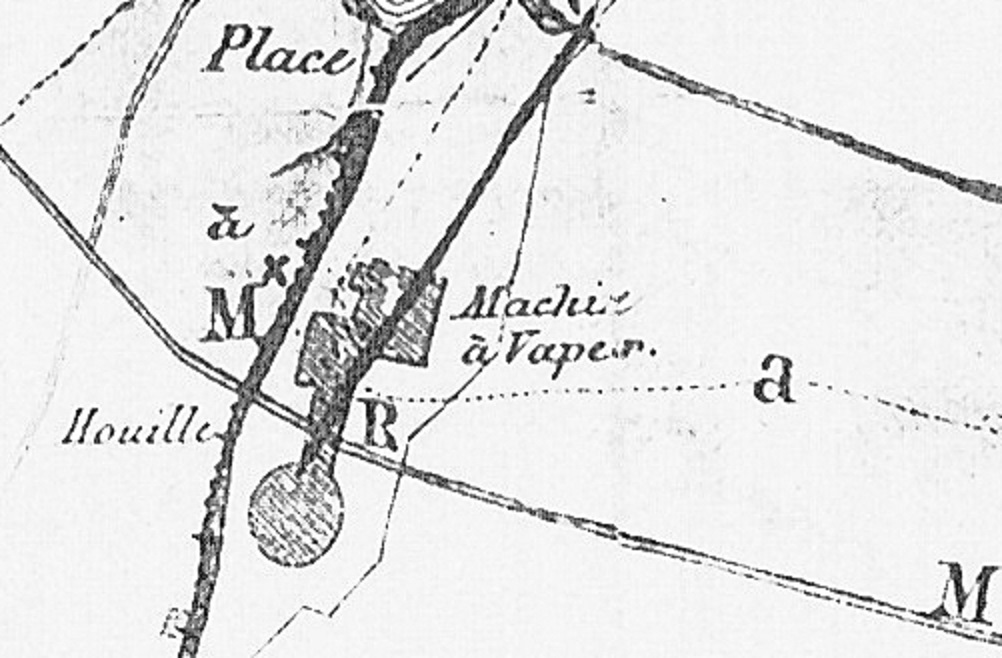
Plan of the working tile floor.

In December 1829, a worker blew on his lamp, into which the firedamp had accumulated, causing a small explosion that burnt three workers. On the following 31 May, a second explosion, also caused by firedamp, killed 28 workers. The entire underground workings were deliberately flooded on 9 June 1830. Production at the shaft in 1830 was 7,200 tonnes, and the workforce consisted of 35 miners and 29 laborers. The following year, the Saint-Louis shaft was deepened to 135 meters in the transitional ground. In 1835, work was blocked to the north and north-west by the old Basvent gallery workings. The installation of a 70 hp steam engine was under consideration but canceled due to the high cost.

In 1840, work was suspended and then abandoned. Two years later, the water was depleted in a search for the alleged coal deposits left by the previous owners, but this was unsuccessful and the shaft was abandoned.

== Reconversion ==
One of the former shaft buildings had been converted into a casino and ballroom; it was demolished in the 1980s due to its dilapidated state.

After the closure of the coalfields, the stables opposite the old shaft were bought by a private owner before being destroyed by fire. The ruins remained until they were demolished on 31 May 2006. At the beginning of the 21st century, no trace of the installations remained (apart from the ruins of a small outbuilding) and the shaft was located under a pavilion at the foot of a hill. In September 2012, a commemorative monument to early mining was built near the old shaft. It is made up of two minecarts and a wood framing.

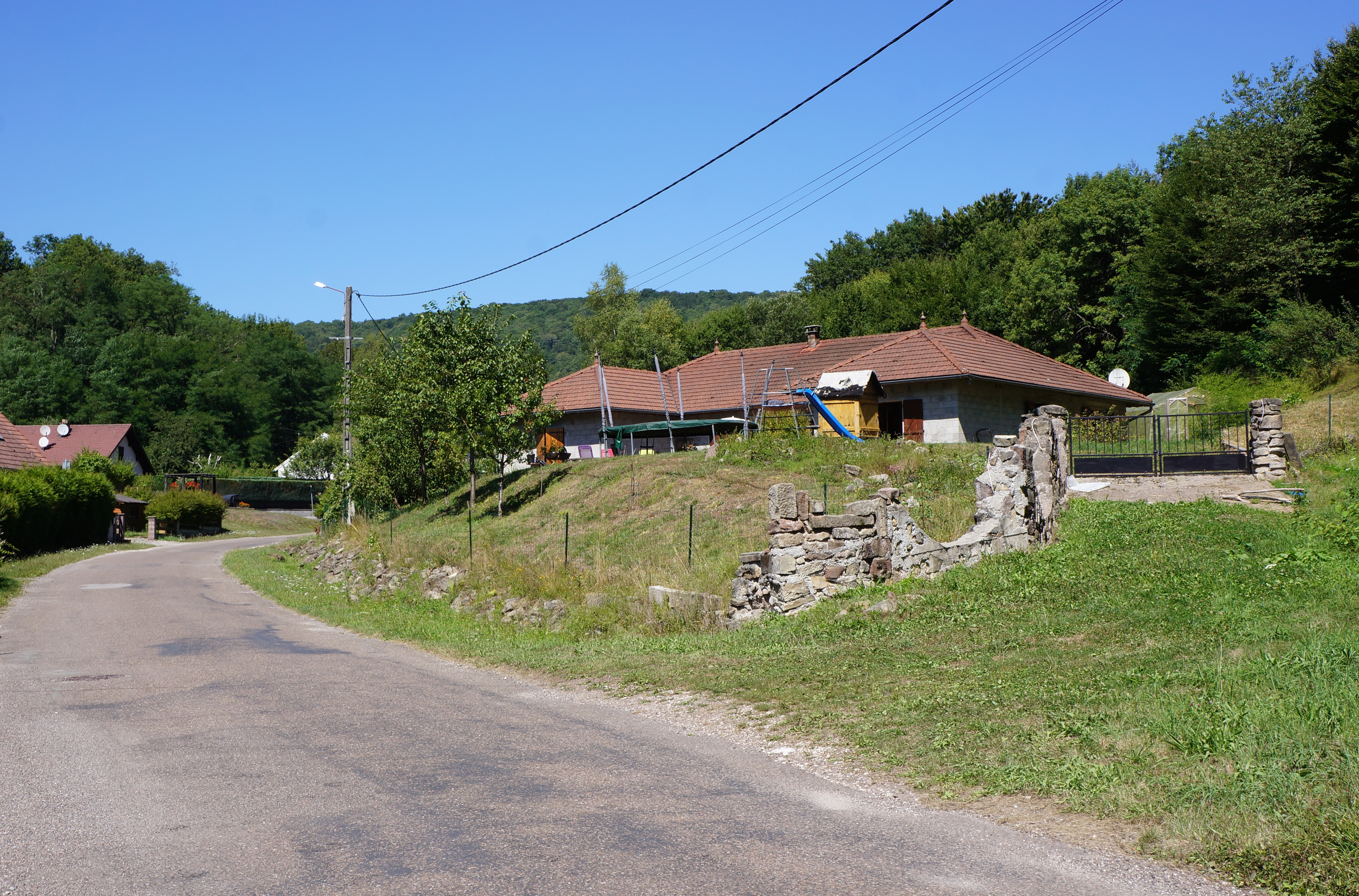
Site of the Saint-Louis shaft.

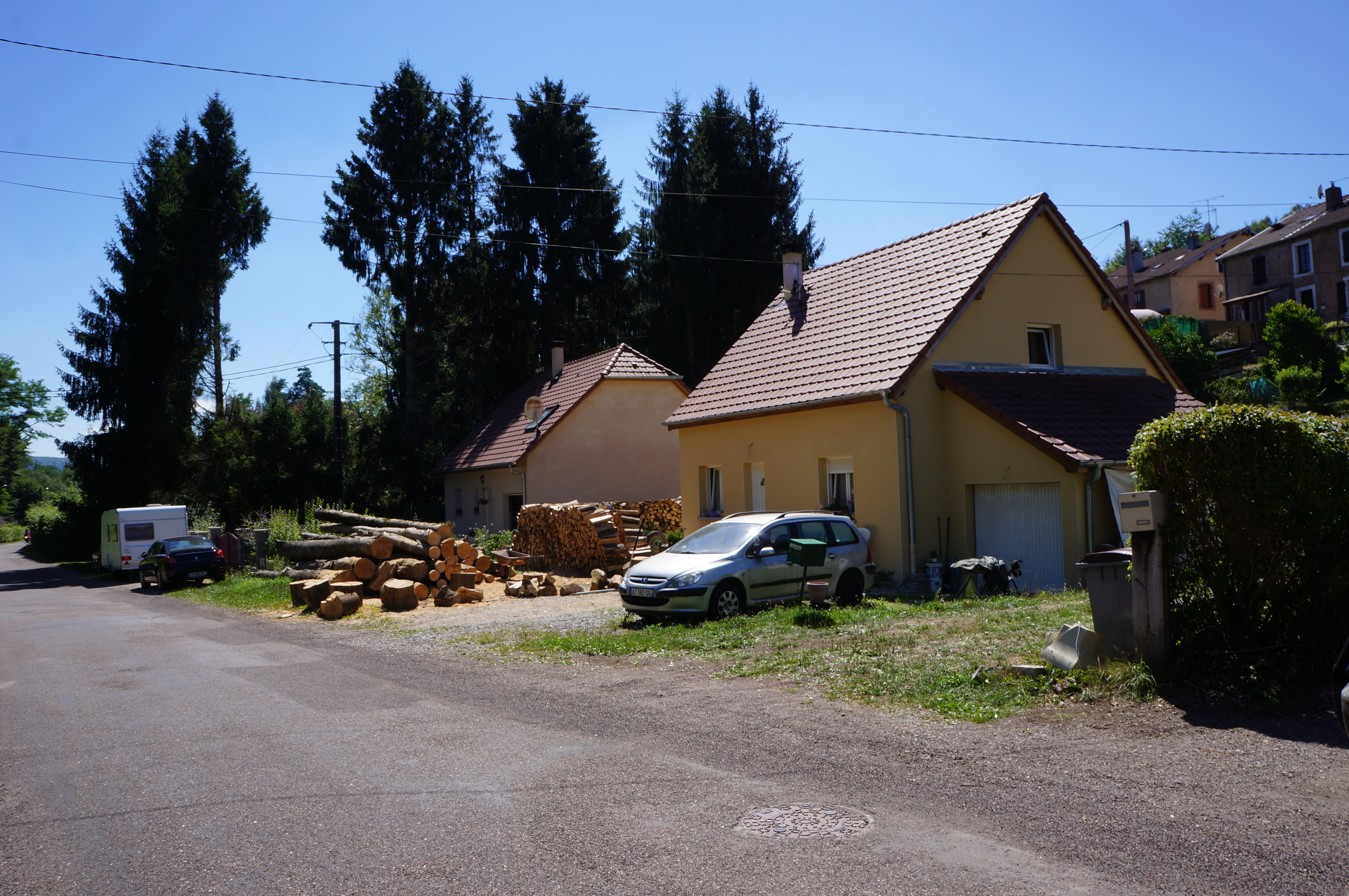
Location of the former stable.

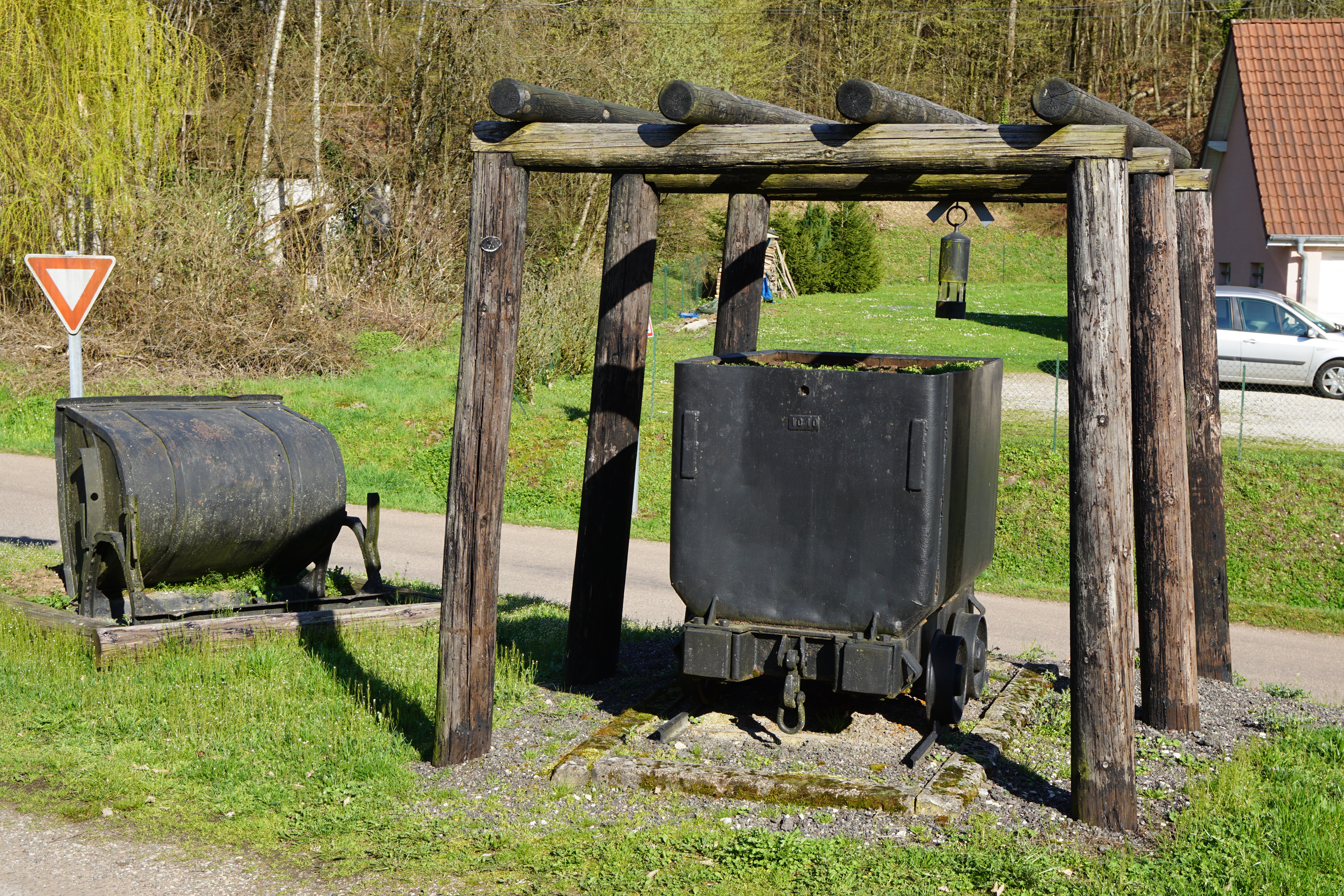
The monument built on the site of the shaft.

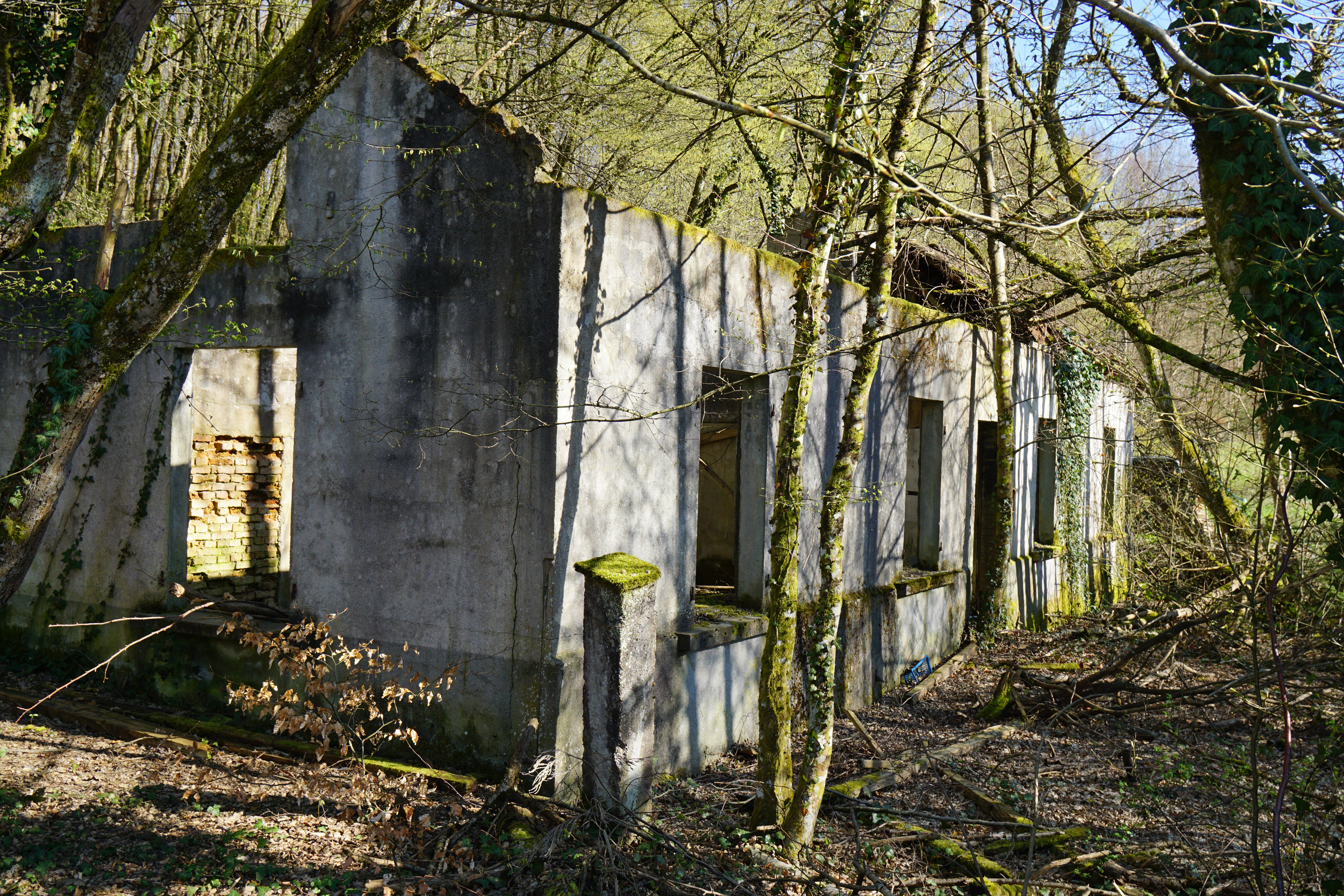
Small annex building in ruins.

== Company town ==
The Plateforme company town was the first mining housing estate in the Ronchampois coalfield. It was built between 1854 and 1855 to replace a building erected in 1836 to house foremen and foreign miners. The housing estate was built on a mound above the stables, opposite the Saint-Louis shaft, which had been backfilled and converted. It was also close to the Henri IV and Saint-Antoine shafts. It is made up of eight identical houses, seven of which have four dshaftings, the last of which has just two. They are built of rendered sandstone rubble, each with three bedrooms, one story and a gable roof with mechanical tiles. The houses were included in the general inventory of cultural heritage on 11 March 2010.

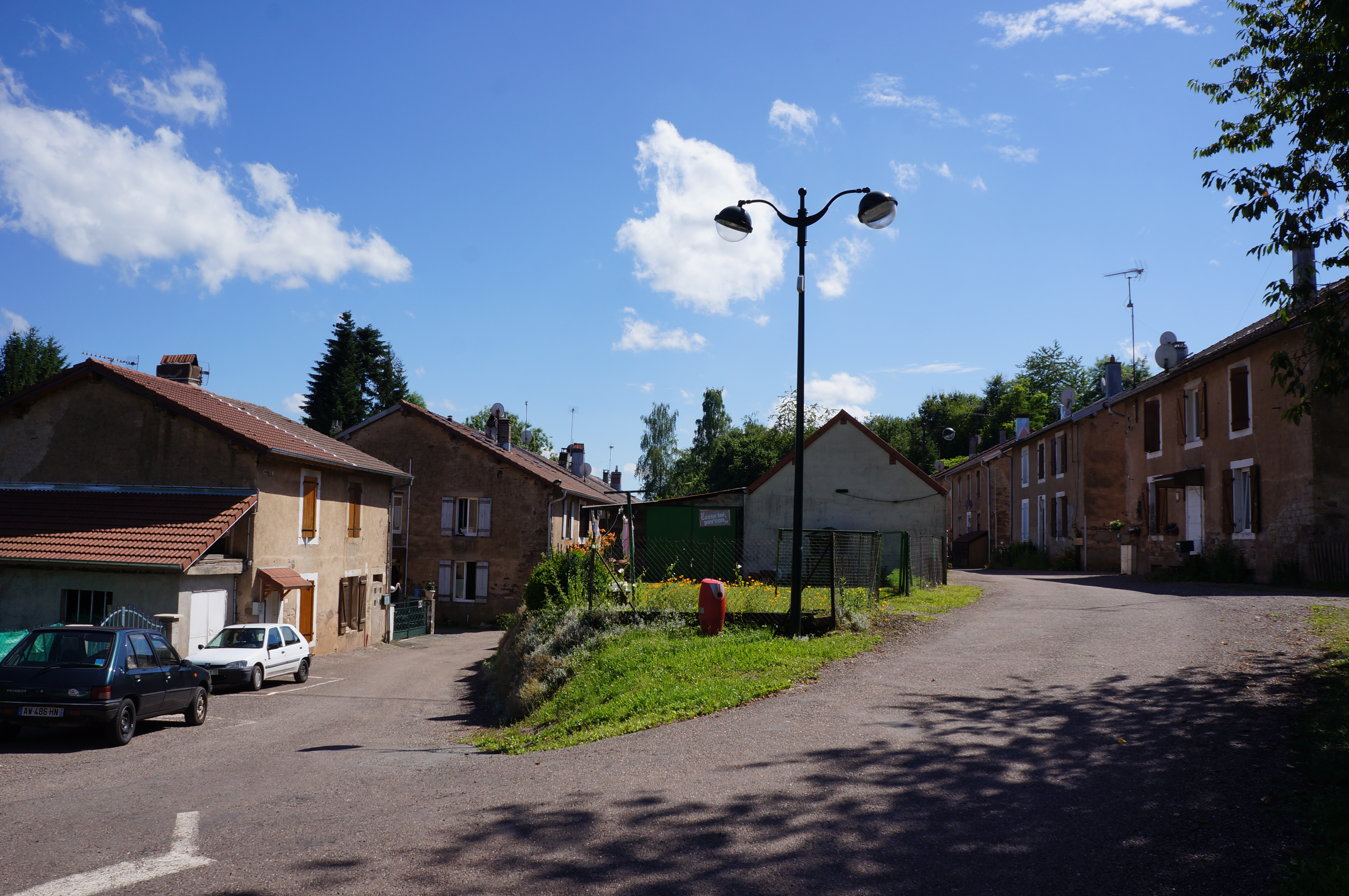
La Plateforme company town.

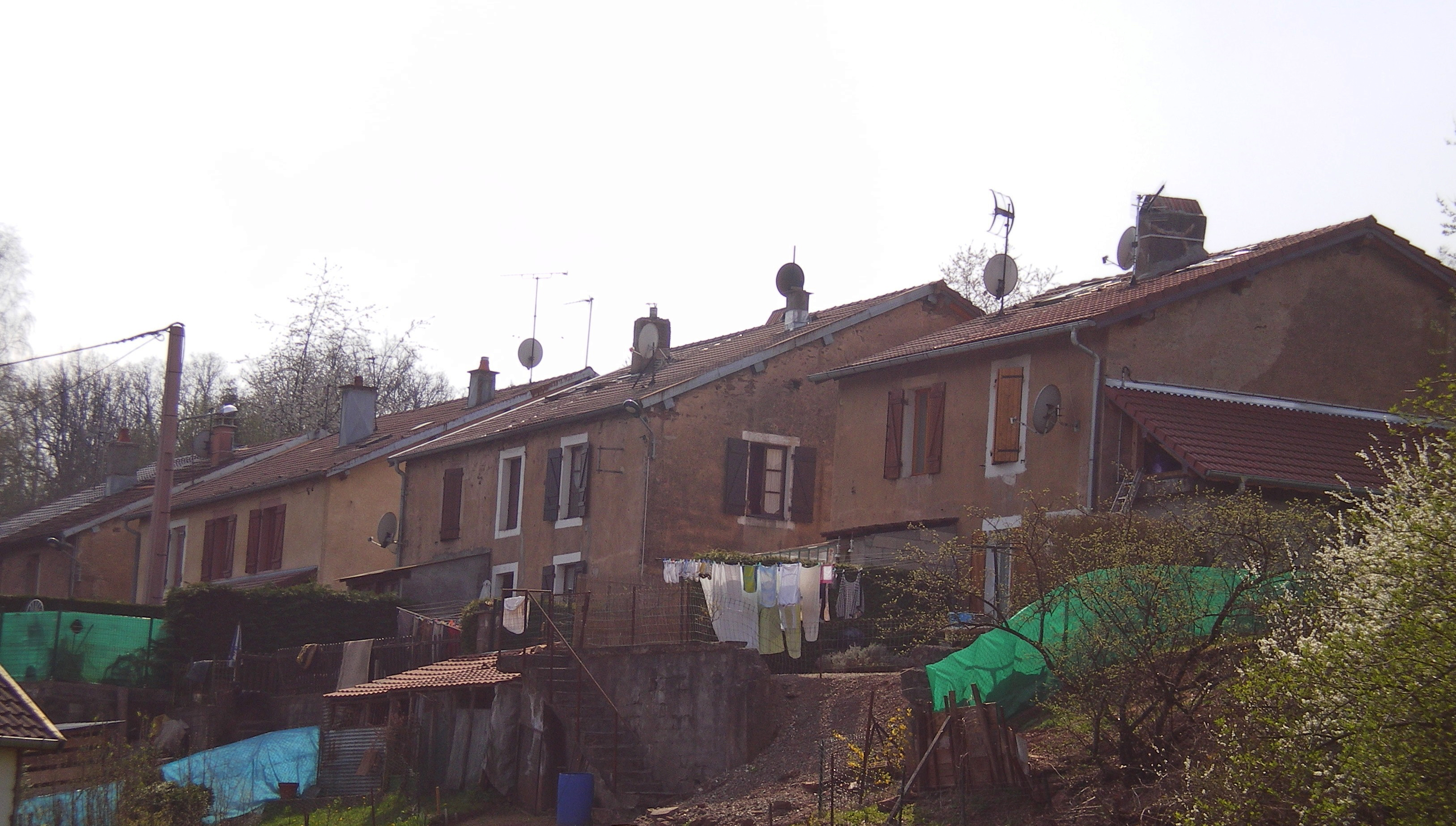
Another view of the company town.

== See also ==
- The first disaster at the Saint-Louis coal mine
- Ronchamp coal mines
- Hamlet of La Houillère
- fr:Mine en France
- The large drainage channel of the Ronchamp coal mines
