= 1824 Saint-Louis coal mine disaster =

1824 coal mining disaster in France

Saint-Louis coal mine disaster
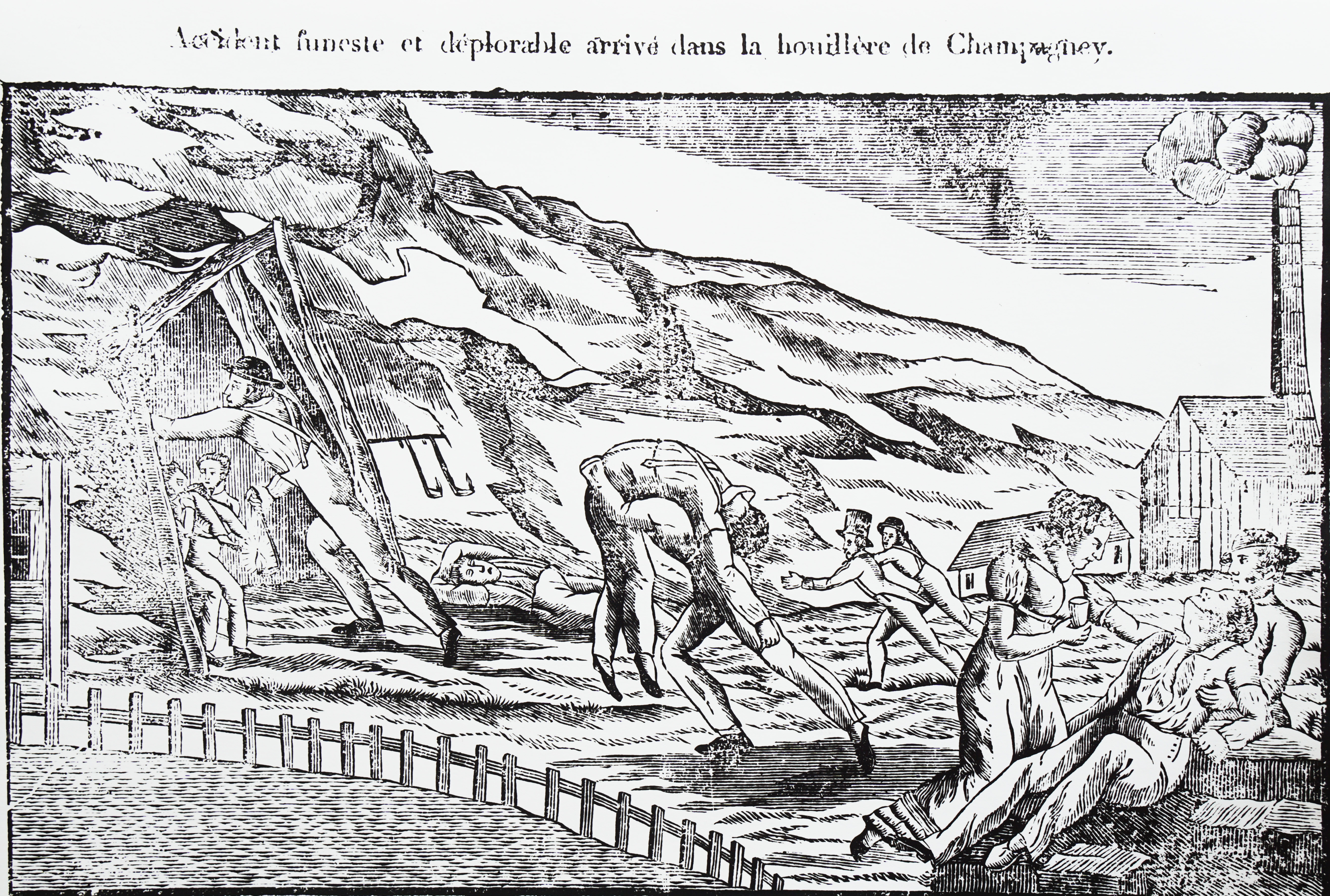
- "Fatal and deplorable accident at the Champagney coal mine".
- Interactive map of Saint-Louis coal mine disaster

Location
- Location: Ronchamp, Haute-Saône, France; 47°42′25″N 06°39′13″E

Production
- Type: Coal mine

Owner
- Company: Ronchamp coal mines

On 10 April 1824 an explosion occurred in the Saint-Louis coal mine in Champagney, France. The explosion, called the first disaster at the Saint-Louis coal mine, was the first firedamp explosion in the Ronchamp and Champagney coalfields (Haute-Saône) and one of the first in France. It was also one of the deadliest in the history of the Ronchamp coal mines, killing twenty and injuring sixteen. The disaster had a profound impact on the local population and national opinion, calling into question the safety of firedamp mines and the conditions of ventilation.

== Background ==
In April 1824, on the north side of the Saint-Louis coal mine, not far from the Basvent adit, in a rugged terrain close to a geological fault, a coal exploration was organized. A strong release of firedamp occurred, which was mitigated by the installation of a fan and ventilation pipes. But this system proved ineffective, and the gas began to accumulate in the workings, which had been abandoned for two years, 50 meters from the shaft.

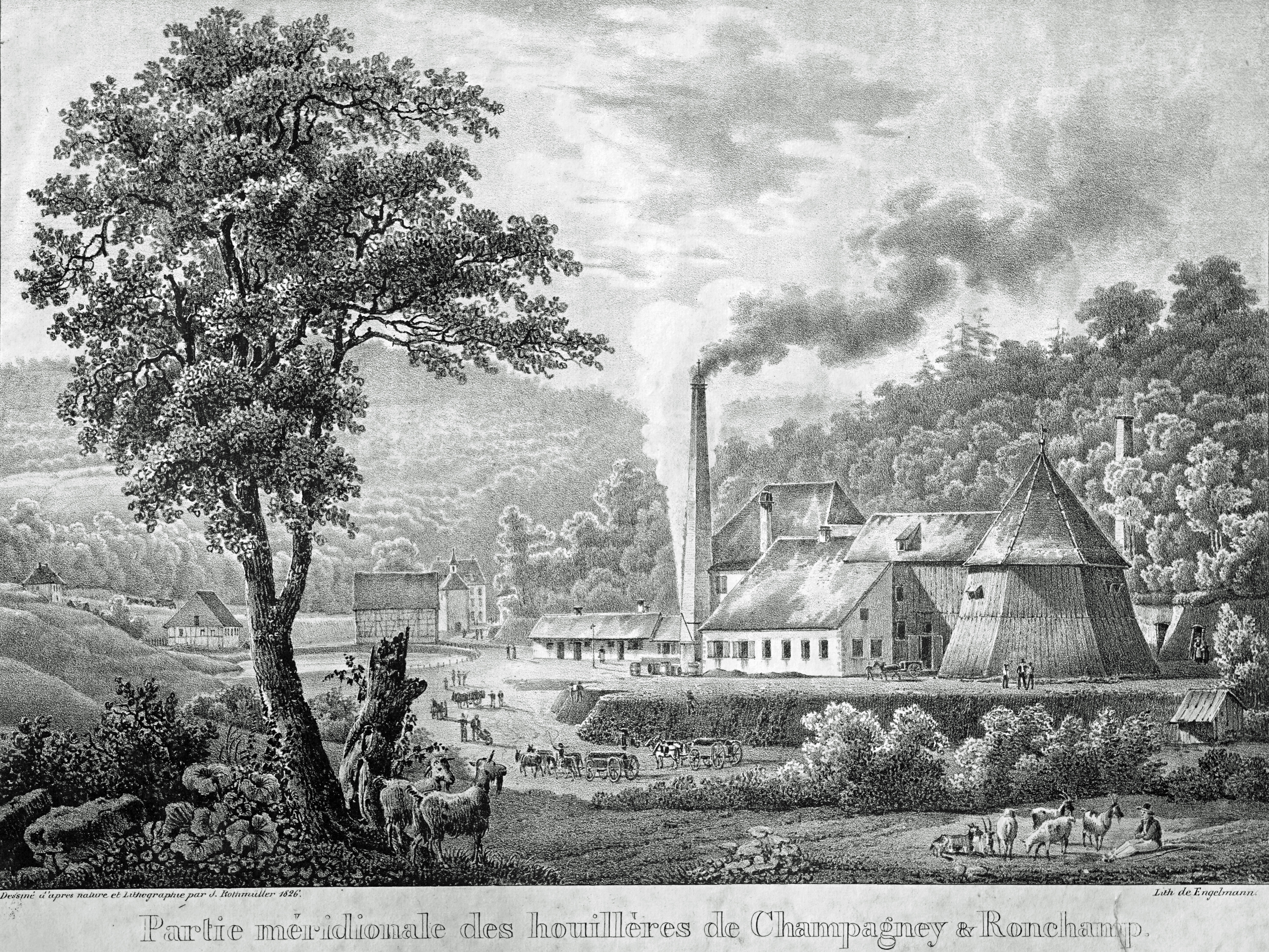
The Saint-Louis coal mine

In August 1821, according to the reports of the time and the civil mining engineer François Mathet (1823-1908), Mr. Parrot, mining engineer, first noticed the presence of firedamp in this mine while drilling the Cheval adit, a short distance from the outcrops. At that time, Mr. Parrot (again according to François Mathet) "recommended that the operators take the precautions in use at the time, which consisted of igniting the firedamp that had accumulated at the top of the tunnels by a worker called Pénitent, who crawled along covered with wet cloths".

According to Mr. Combes, in a report to the Académie des Sciences entitled Physique du lobe - Sur le dégagement du grisou ou hydrogène carboné, dans les mines de charbon de terre (Physics of the lobe - On the release of firedamp or carbonized hydrogen in coal mines):

"According to a report by the mining engineers, the flammable gas was rarely seen in this mine and very small quantities; however, a small release had occurred shortly before the accident during a reconnaissance operation at the bottom of the Saint-Louis shaft (. ..)".

== Course of events ==
On 10 April 1824 the first firedamp explosion occurred in the Ronchamp coalfield, one of the first in France. Depending on the version, the explosion was caused either by contact with the flames of the lamps of the workers in the tunnel or by the presence of one of them in the old workings.

== Outcome ==
The deflagration spread over a distance of 800 meters, killing twenty people, including a miner manager, injuring sixteen with varying degrees of seriousness, and destroying the mine. The tragedy had a major impact on the local population, not only because it was the first accident of its kind, but also because of the number of victims.

== Consequences ==
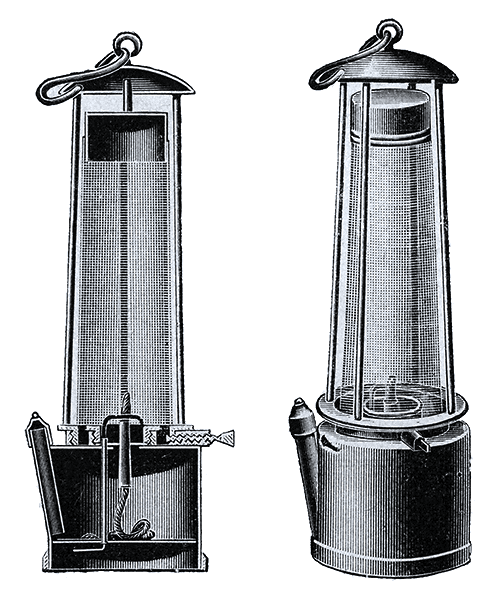
Davy lamp

On 1 July 1824 the Mining Board decided to mandate the first Davy safety lamp. On 21 January 1826 the state made the use of safety lamps compulsory, despite the opposition of the workers. Several exemptions watered down this measure.

However, several other serious explosions occurred in the area, and the second disaster at the Saint-Louis coal mine claimed the lives of thirty miners on 31 May 1830.

== See also ==
- Firedamp
- Saint-Louis Coal Mine
- Ronchamp coal mines
- Hamlet of La Houillère
