= Ronchamp coal mines adit =

Adit used to drain the mine water

The Ronchamp coal mines adit is a large drainage channel with brick walls at the mines of the same name. It was used to drain the mine water between 1783 and 1840. It has a section of 70 × 50 cm and is 1.3 km long. It was supplied by the Henri IV shaft and the Clocher adit.

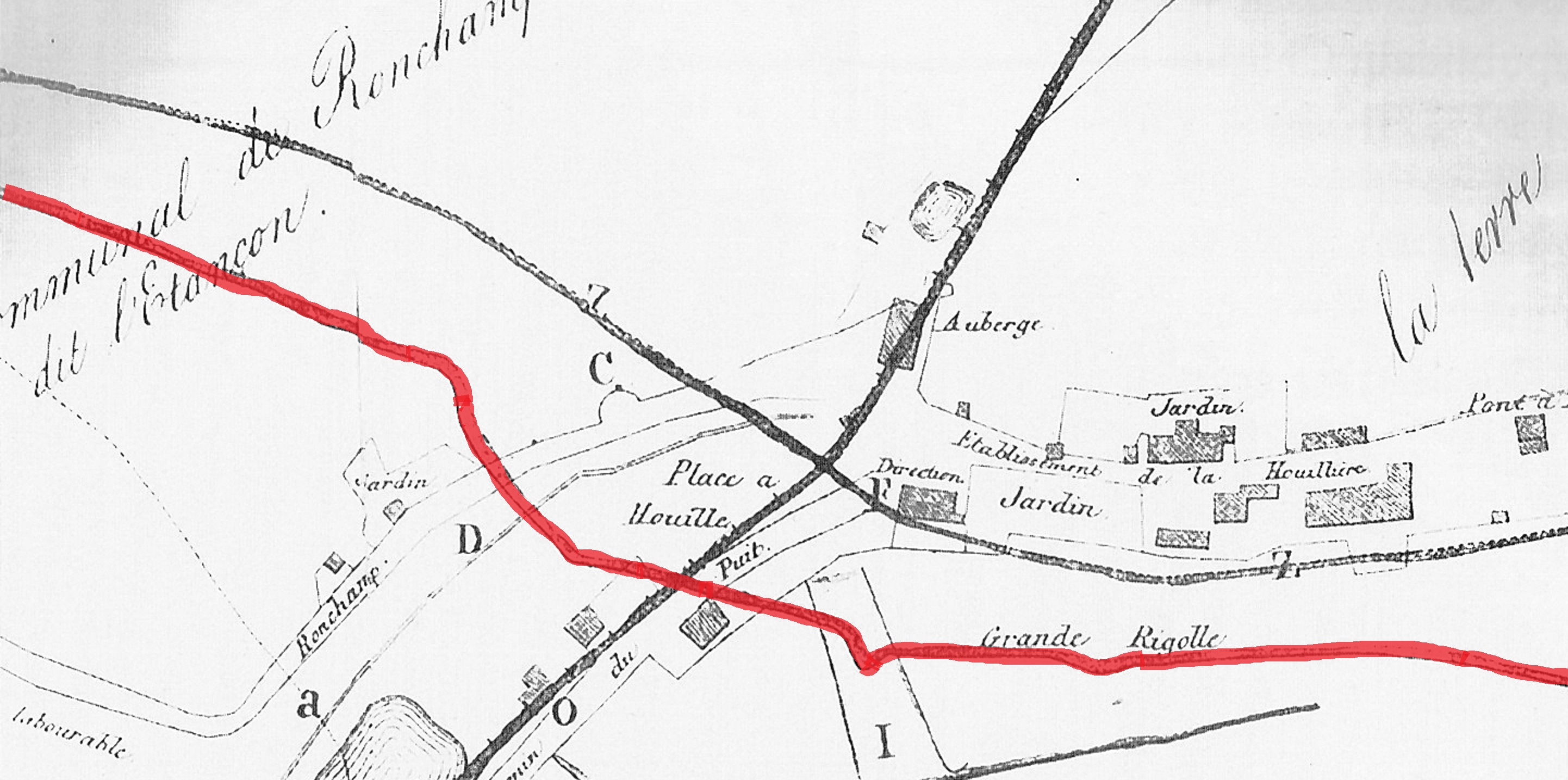
Map showing the passage of the large drainage channel at the hamlet of La Houillère.

Other mines were opened in the area around 1950.

In 1997, the historical mining circuit of the outcrops was created and the exit of the channel was included as a point of interest, together with a more recent dewatering adit. At the beginning of the 21st century, the site was redesigned and a nearby adit that was discovered at the time was restored.

== History ==
When coal deposits were discovered in Ronchamp in the middle of the 18th century, concessions were granted and the first adits were opened in the hills above the villages of Ronchamp and Champagney.

As the mines were inundated with water and had to be drained, the large drainage channel was dug by the operators from east to west to perform this function, making the extraction work easier and more energy-intensive.

It was in use from 1783 to 1840 (when it was abandoned after the end of coal mining in the local adits). When mining moved south of the channel, pumps had to be used to bring the water up to the channel. First with simple wooden buckets, then with primitive pumps made from tree trunks.

- After World War II, new mines were opened near the channel.
- In 1952, the Samson shaft was dug near the old shaft of the same name.
- An unnamed adit was dug next to the large channel.
- A dewatering adit (which quickly sank to a depth of 30 meters) equipped with an electric pump proved inadequate during the flood of December 1950.

== Description ==
The adit has a section of 70 × 50 cm, a length of 1.3 km, and brick walls. It follows a path that crosses the hamlet of La Houillère from east to west, starting under the Chevanel hill, just below the site of the future shaft n°3 on the Champagney territory. The water is discharged into the Fourchie pond in the Etançon forest, near the old Samson shaft.

In 1816, a water wheel was installed at the Clocher adit, using a stream from the valley. An artificial pond was built to alleviate the problem of the stream drying up. The Henri IV shaft dumped its effluent into the pond, which was then drawn from the adits by hand pumps and then by ox-drawn pumps operating at a rate of twelve to fifteen pulses per minute, with a flow rate of 1.5 liters per piston stroke. Finally, other hand pumps were used to transfer the water to the channel.

== Vestiges ==
In 1997, the historic mining circuit of the outcrops was created. The outlet of the channel and the dewatering adit from the 1950s were included as sites of interest.

The large drainage channel flowed into the Fourchie Pond, which still existed at the beginning of the 21st century. This pond (now a marsh) was red because it was still filled with water from the pyrite-rich mines.

At the end of 2012, the commune of Ronchamp undertook restoration work on the south side of the municipal landfill, which had been converted into a civic amenity site, to bring it up to standard. The people in charge of the work and the members of the Mining Museum Association discovered on the site the remains of mine pipes and an old adit that had been flooded when the land was excavated and that was connected to the outlet of the large drainage channel. There was no trace of masonry in the adit, which was larger than the engineers reported. Research revealed that it was an unnamed post-nationalization adit (1946). After dewatering and draining the mine water, the adit was renovated in the spring of 2013 to make a few meters of it accessible.

The woodwork is made of oak planks and boards. Also, it can be seen a pick and an axe, two tools symbolizing the miners, at the entrance.

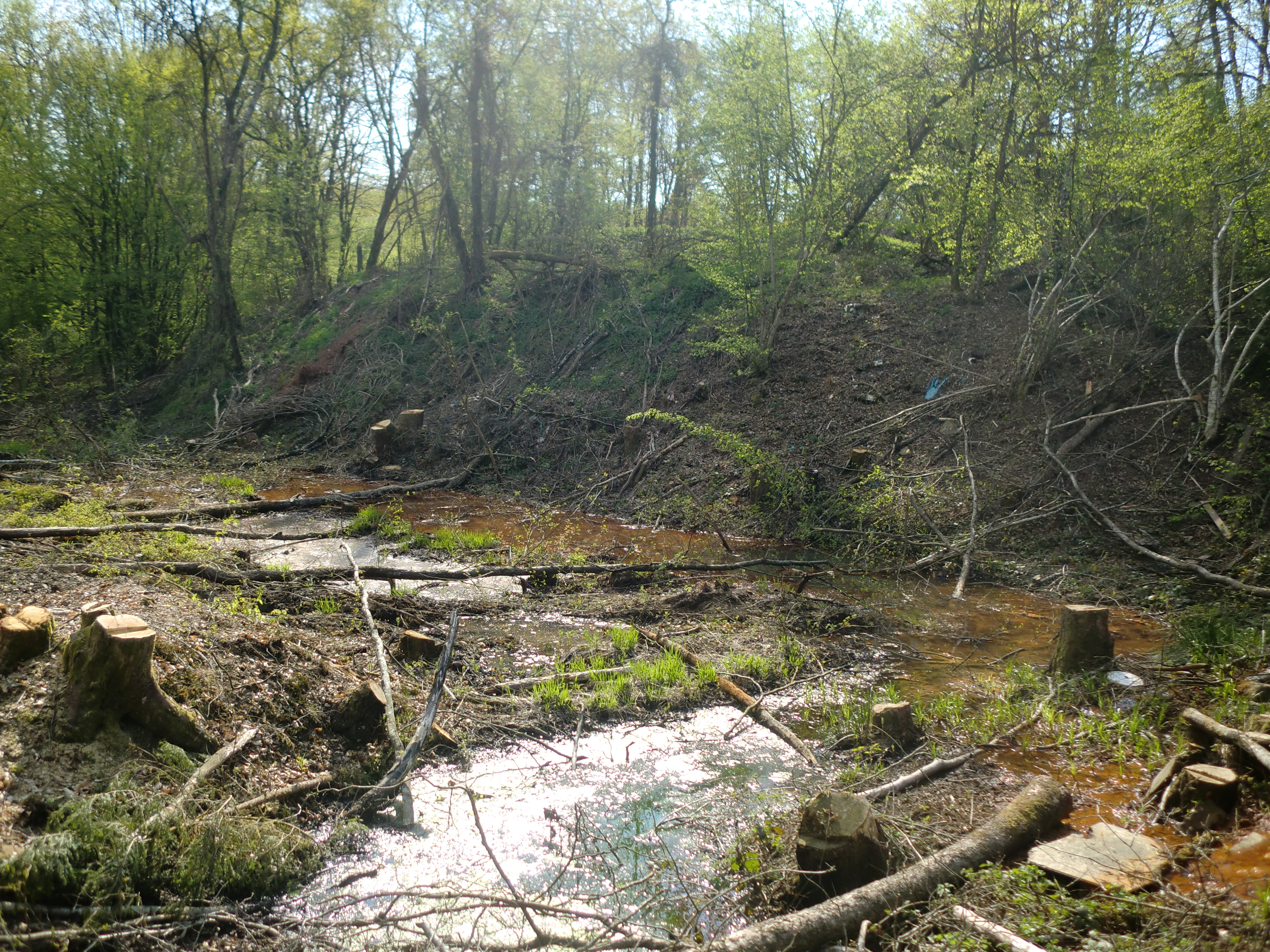
Fourchie pond

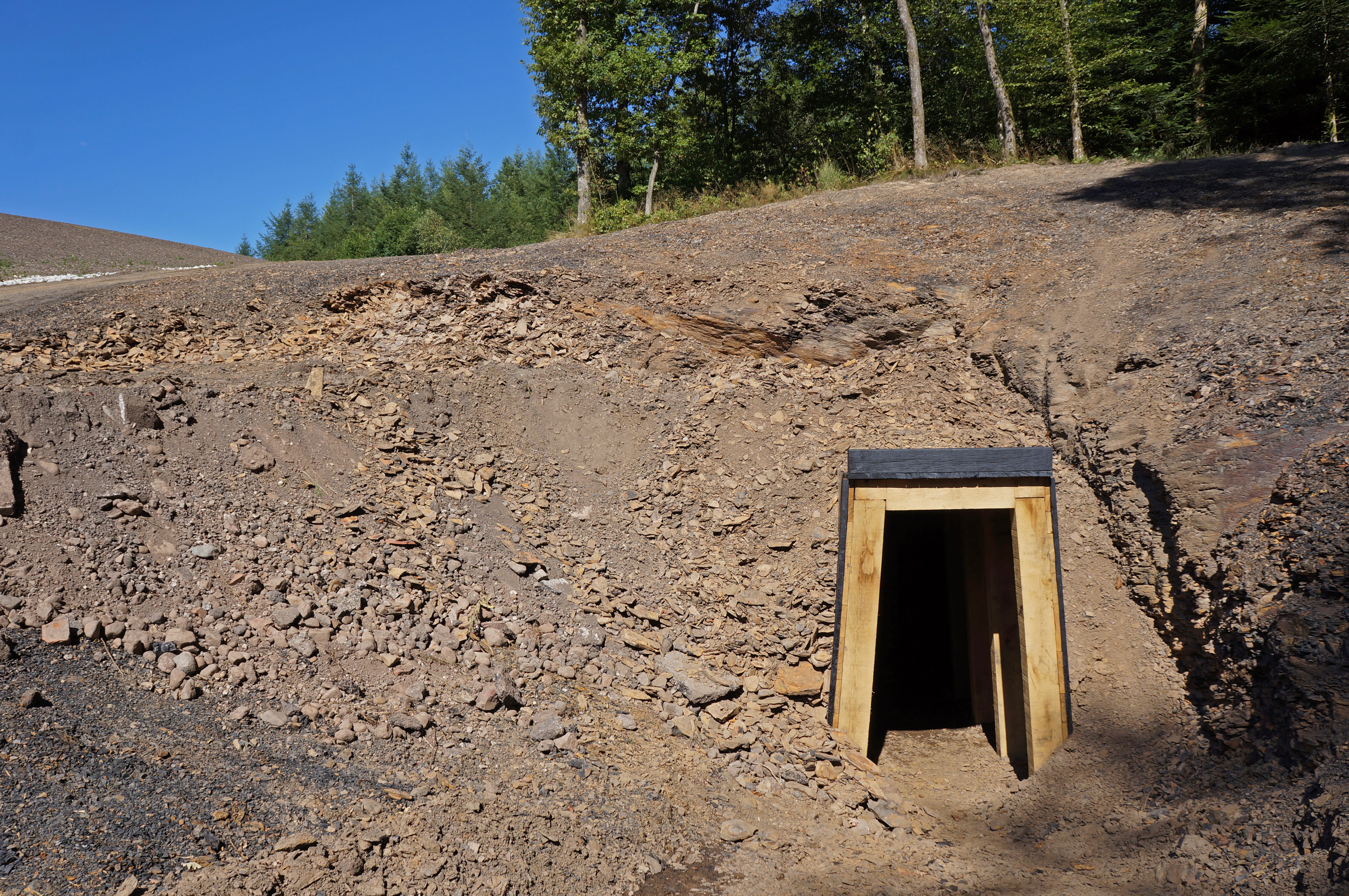
The renovated entrance to the Etançon adit.

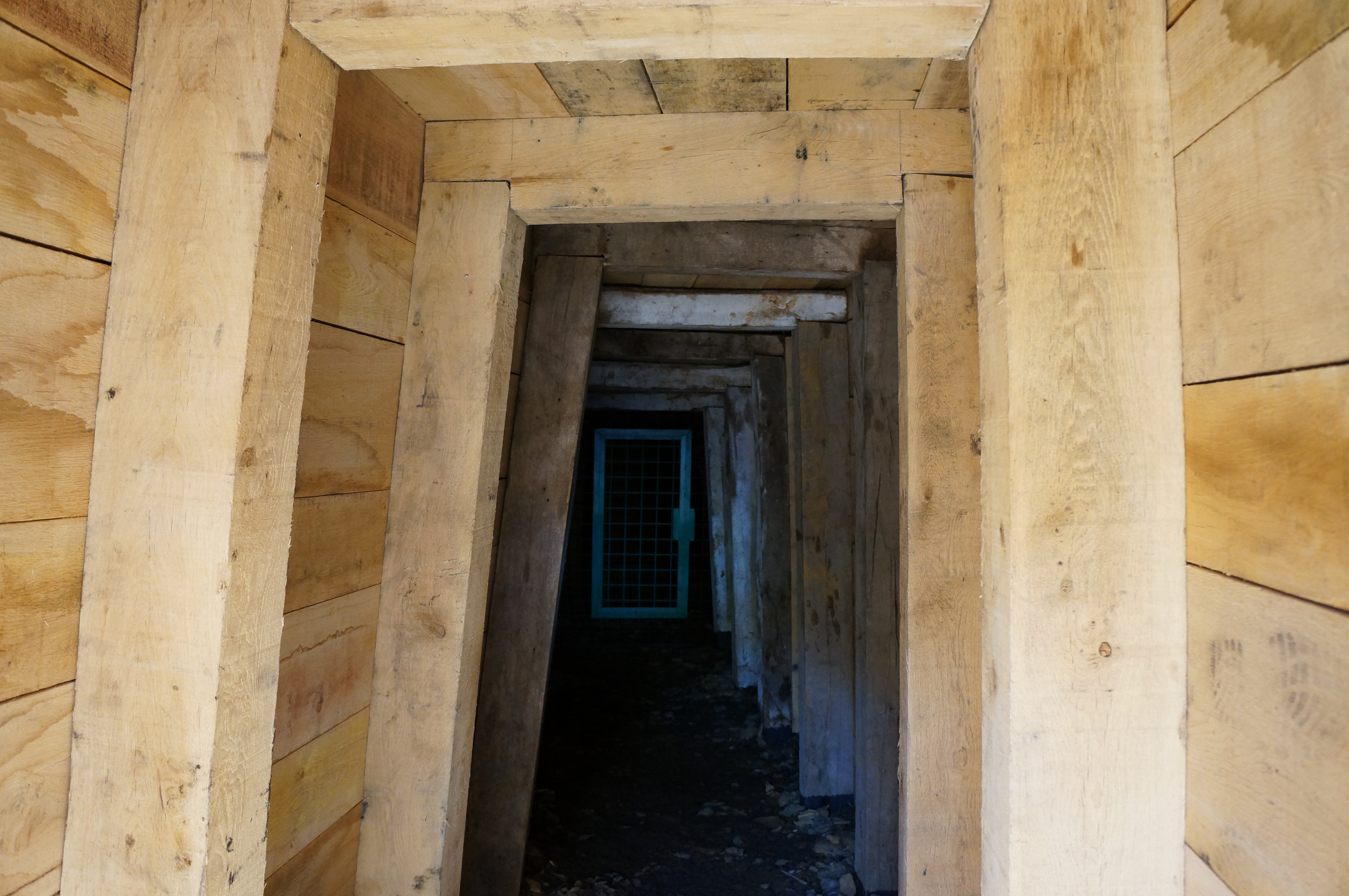
Secured section that can be visited.

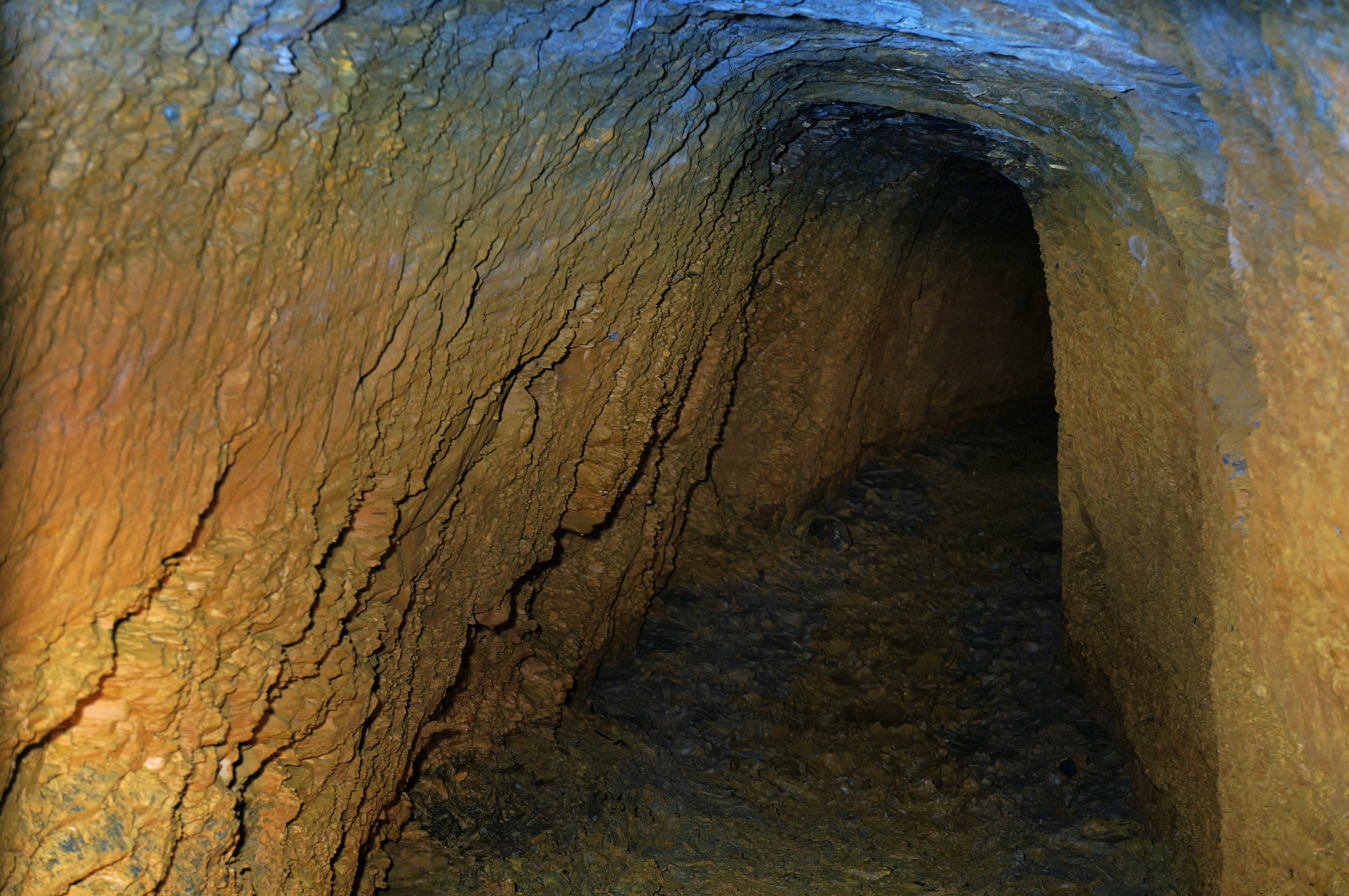
Undeveloped section that cannot be visited.

== See also ==
- Mining in France
- Ronchamp coal mines
- Hamlet of La Houillère

== Bibliography ==
- Parietti, Jean-Jacques (2001). Les Houillères de Ronchamp vol. I : La mine (in French). Vesoul: Éditions Comtoises. ISBN 2-914425-08-2.
- Parietti, Jean-Jacques (2010). Les Houillères de Ronchamp - Tome 2 : Les mineurs (in French). Fc culture & patrimoine. ISBN 978-2362300011.
- Mathet, François (1881). Mémoire sur les mines de Ronchamp (in French). Saint-Étienne.
