= Steiger (mining) =

Underground mining supervisor in Germany

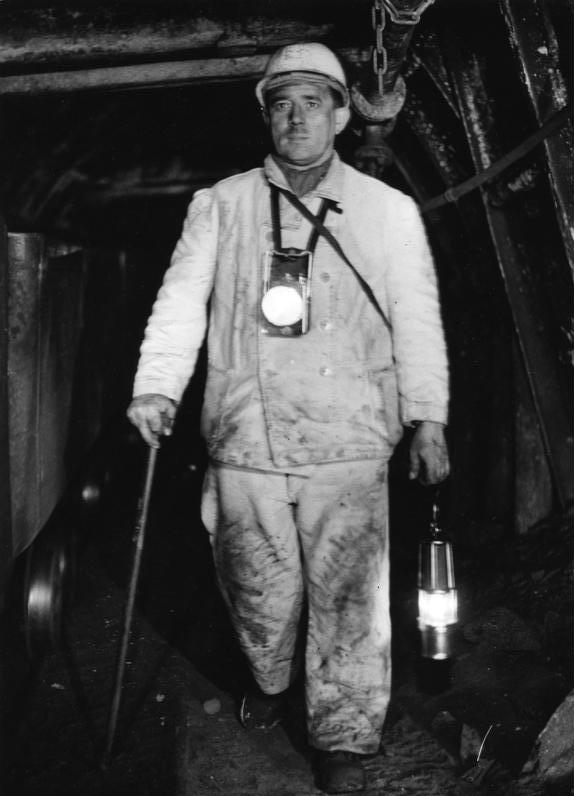
A Steiger in the Ruhr mining region with his cane (Häckel) and lamp

A Steiger (literally "climber") is the title of a mining foreman or mine manager, used in German-speaking Europe and Poland. He bears responsibility for part of an underground coal mine and the people subordinated to him. The name is derived from the former role of a Steiger, who continually had to climb into and out of the pit. The Steiger is celebrated in a very popular German mining song, the "Steigerlied" ("Glückauf, Glückauf; der Steiger kommt").

== Historical role ==
In medieval and early modern times, the state mining regulations obliged mining companies to employ pit officials for the supervision of their mines. Until the mid-19th century, these officials were civil servants. The term Steiger for these pit officials became established very early on in the mining regulations. The hiring and firing of pit officials was the responsibility of the mining authority or Bergamt; at best the mine owners had a say and could impress their wishes on the Bergmeister in this regard. With the reform of mining law in the years from 1851 to 1865, there was a change in the official status of the Steiger. The Steiger was no longer a state official, but a private officer. Despite this change, Steigers continued to be employed by the mining authority.
