= Underground mine ventilation =

Air ventilation for a mine

Schematic of underground mine ventilation

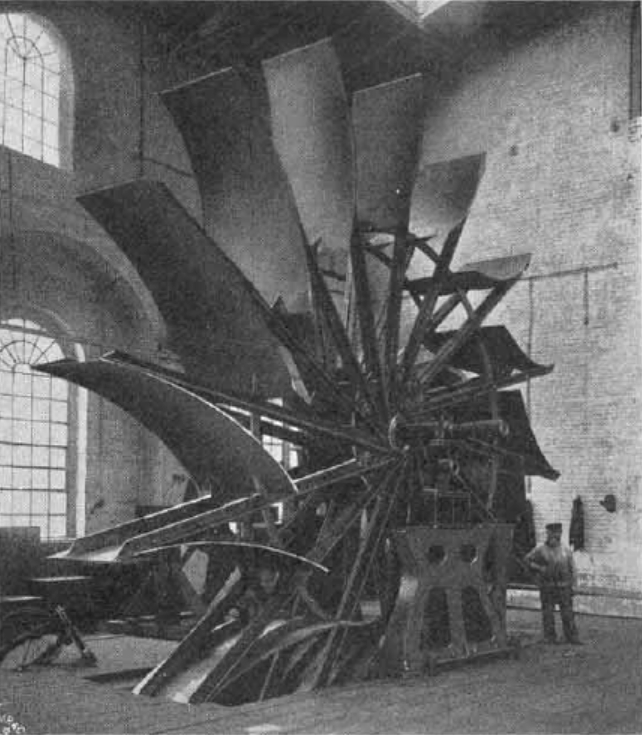
Ventilation fans, such as this, can be used to ventilate mines.

Underground mine ventilation provides a flow of air to the underground workers of a mine with sufficient volume to dilute and remove dust and noxious gases (typically NO_{x}, SO_{2}, methane, CO_{2} and CO) and to regulate temperature. The source of these gases are equipment that runs on diesel engines, blasting with explosives, and the orebody itself. Regulations often require airflow to be distributed within mines to improve air quality.

The largest component of the operating cost for mine ventilation is electricity to power the ventilation fans, which may account for one third of a typical underground mine's entire electrical power cost.

== Types of ventilation ==
Flow-through ventilation is the main ventilation circuit for the mine. Air enters the mine from the surface via a shaft, ventilation raise or adit. The air is distributed through the mine via internal ventilation raises and ramps, and flows are controlled by regulators and permanently mounted ventilation fans. An auxiliary ventilation system takes air from the flow-through system and distributes it to the mine workings via temporarily mounted ventilation fans, Venturi tubes and disposable fabric or steel ducting. Auxiliary fan and duct systems may be either forcing systems, where fresh air is pushed into mine headings, or exhausting systems that draw out contaminated air.

== Ventilation control ==
Sufficient volume of air is required for proper ventilation. A bulk of electric power is required for driving fans. By installing variable speed control air quantity can be optimized hence the power. At every place in the mine where persons are required to work or pass, the air should not contain less than 19% of oxygen or more than 0.5% of carbon dioxide or any noxious gas in quantity likely to affect the health of any person. The percentage of inflammable gas does not exceed 0.75% in the general body of the return air of any ventilating district and 1.25% in any place in the mine.

When installing auxiliary ventilation systems, particular care must be taken to ensure that return air does not mix with the intake air stream and get recirculated into the area being ventilated.Auxiliary ventilation must not be used in underground mining operations where mine gases are present. Vortex ducts are used to mix methane concentrations into the air stream, particularly in mechanized drivage operations.

Auxiliary ventilation can be operated in either forcing or exhausting mode:

- in forcing auxiliary ventilation, the fan draws fresh air from the intake air stream and blows it into the mine working; the return air flows back to the entrance outside the duct.
- in exhausting auxiliary ventilation, the fan draws return air out of the heading and discharges it at the entrance; fresh air flows in from the entrance outside the duct.

== Regulations ==
The volume (expressed in cubic feet per minute or cubic meters per second) of air required to ventilate an underground mine is determined by mining engineers based on a wide variety of parameters. In most countries minimum requirements are outlined by law, regulation or standards. However, in some developing countries the mandated ventilation requirement may be insufficient, and the mining company may have to increase the ventilation flow, in particular where ventilation may be required to cool the ambient temperature in a deep hot mine, however auto-compression must also be taken into account. As per CMR 153-2-(i)(2017), in every ventilating district not less than six cubic meters per minute of air per person employed in the district on the largest shift or not less than 2.5 cubic meters per minute of air per daily tons output whichever is larger, passes along the last ventilation connection in the district which means the inbye-most gallery in the district along which the air passes.

== Heating ==
In temperate climates ventilation air may need to be heated during winter months. This will make the working environment more hospitable for miners, and prevent freezing of workings, in particular water pipes. In Arctic mines, where the mining horizon is above the permafrost, heating may not take place to prevent melting the permafrost. "Cold mines" such as Raglan Mine and Nanisivik Mine are designed to operate below 0 °C.

The wet bulb temperature in any working place does not exceed 33.5 °C and where the wet bulb temperature exceeds 30.5 °C arrangements are made to ventilate the same with a current of air moving at a speed of not less than one meter per second.

== Tunnels ==
Long tunnels may have ventilation shafts.
