= Ronchamp coal mines central workshops and offices =

Offices of French mining company

Ronchamp Coal Mines central workshops and offices
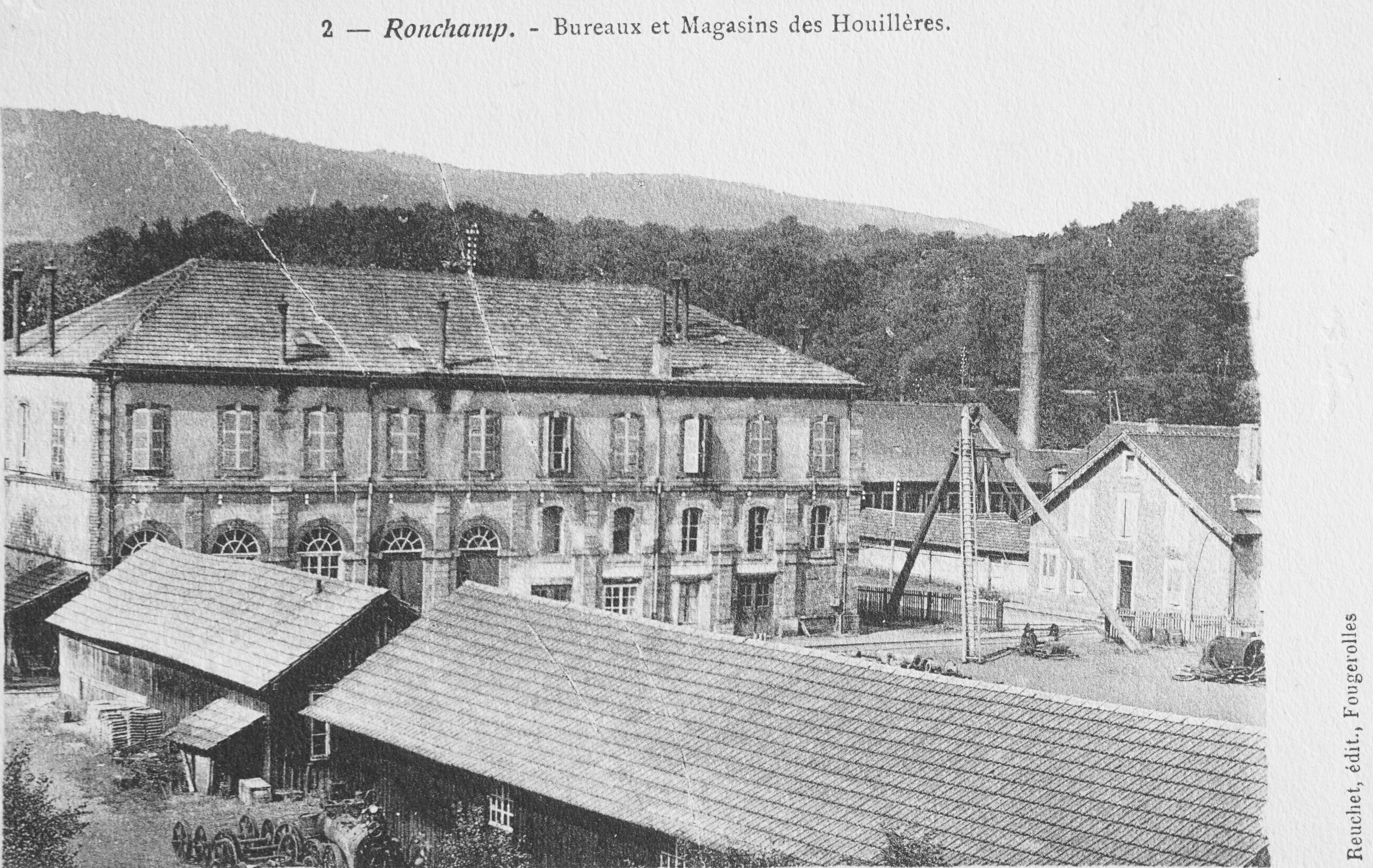
- Interactive map of Ronchamp Coal Mines central workshops and offices
- Location: Ronchamp and Champagney (Haute-Saône); 47°42′09″N 6°39′11″E
- Type: Repair shops and administrative offices (1850–1958); Automotive subcontracting (1958–1980)
- Opened: 1850
- Closed: 1958 (coal mines); 2008 (automotive subcontracting)
- Company: Ronchamp Coal Mines (1850-1958); MagLum (1958-1980); Somero (1980-1997-2005)

The Ronchamp coal mines central workshops and offices served as the administrative and operational center of the mining company in eastern France from the mid-19th century until the closure of the mines in 1958. The site was subsequently converted into an automotive subcontracting facility with the establishment of the company MagLum, which went bankrupt in 1980. Industrial activity continued under the company Somero, before the property was acquired by Gestamp in 2005 and abandoned in 2008.

The site is located south of the hamlet of La Houillère, between the director’s residence and the Saint-Charles shaft. It is connected to the coal mines’ railway network, with a station situated opposite the premises on the other side of the road. In the early 21st century, the premises were used occasionally for exhibitions and recreational shooting activities. The former office building was later severely damaged by a fire and was demolished at the end of 2021.

== History ==
The surroundings of the Saint-Charles mine shaft, central workshops, and large coal mining offices. Slag heaps Mining buildings Mining town Coal mining network Line from Vesoul to Plancher-les-Mines (Haute-Saône local railways) Line from Paris-Est to Mulhouse-Ville (Compagnie des chemins de fer de l'Est, then SNCF)

=== Main offices and workshops of the coal mines ===
Following the opening of the Saint-Charles shaft on 5 May 1844 and its favorable results, the company decided to relocate its central workshops and offices, previously situated in the hamlet of La Houillère, to a site adjacent to the shaft and to connect them to the railway network. The initial facilities comprised three main buildings—a forge, a carpentry workshop, and a warehouse for hoisting cables—as well as housing for the workshop foreman. These installations, however, quickly became inadequate in light of technological developments, leading the company to carry out a number of repairs in private factories in Ronchamp.

The mechanical power required to operate the site was initially supplied by a turbine driven by the flow of the Rahin, diverted into a small canal. This system proved unreliable, as water flow was often insufficient, particularly during frequent summer droughts. The turbine was therefore replaced by a 10-horsepower steam engine, which made it possible to operate a greater number of machine tools. In 1875, this engine was itself replaced by a Wolff-type steam engine with horizontal cylinders, offering roughly double the power. From 1865, timber processing activities were centralized in the mine workshops. Logs were delivered there, cut to size, and then transported by rail to the company’s various shafts for use in mine timbering. The consumption of wood declined in the following century with the gradual adoption of metal supports.

Around 1860, the main office buildings were constructed to house the director, engineers, and surveyors. In the early 20th century, their ground floors accommodated the administrative services of the power plant and the coke works. These premises remained the administrative center of the coal mines until their closure in 1958.

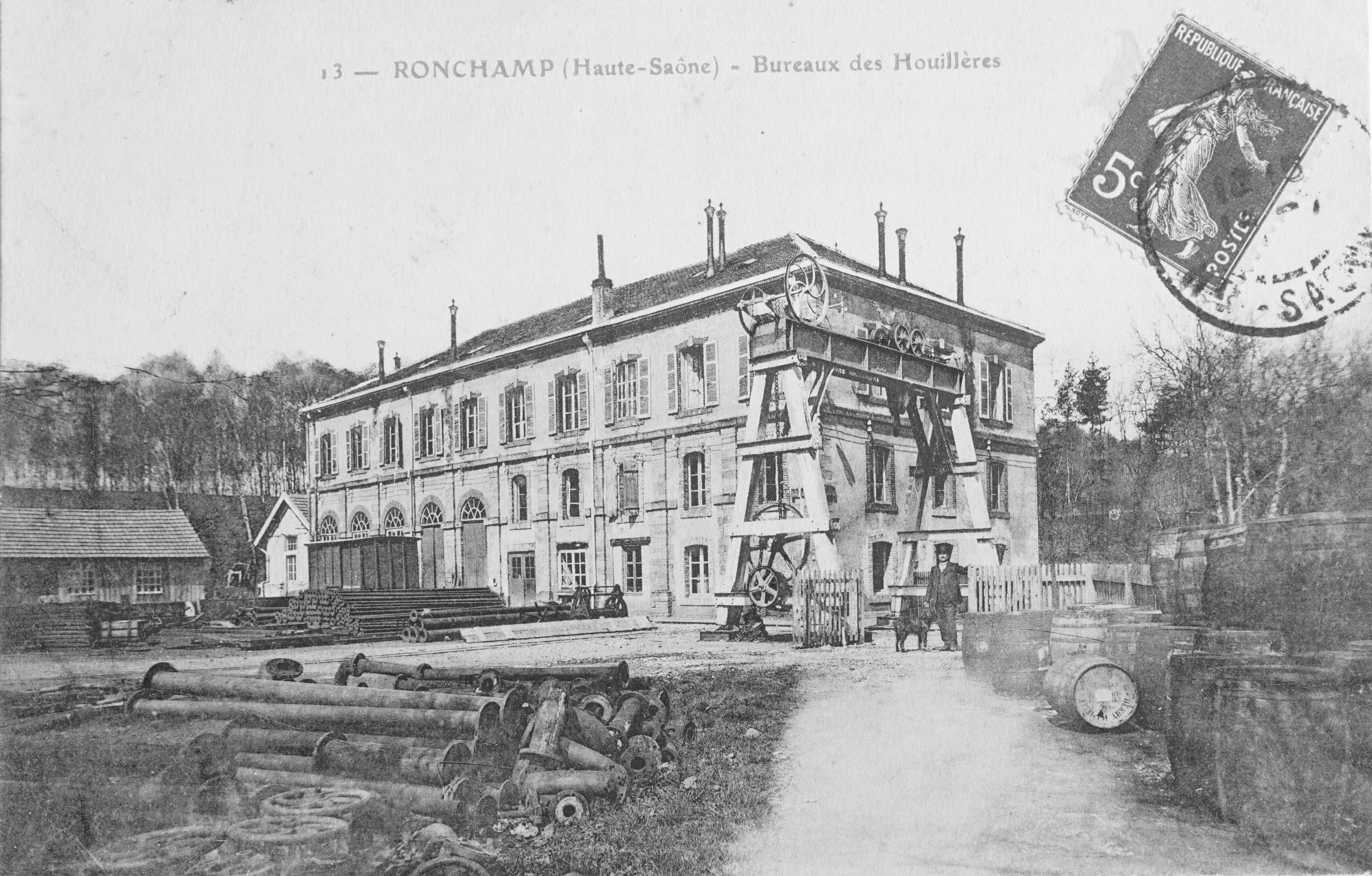
The office building.

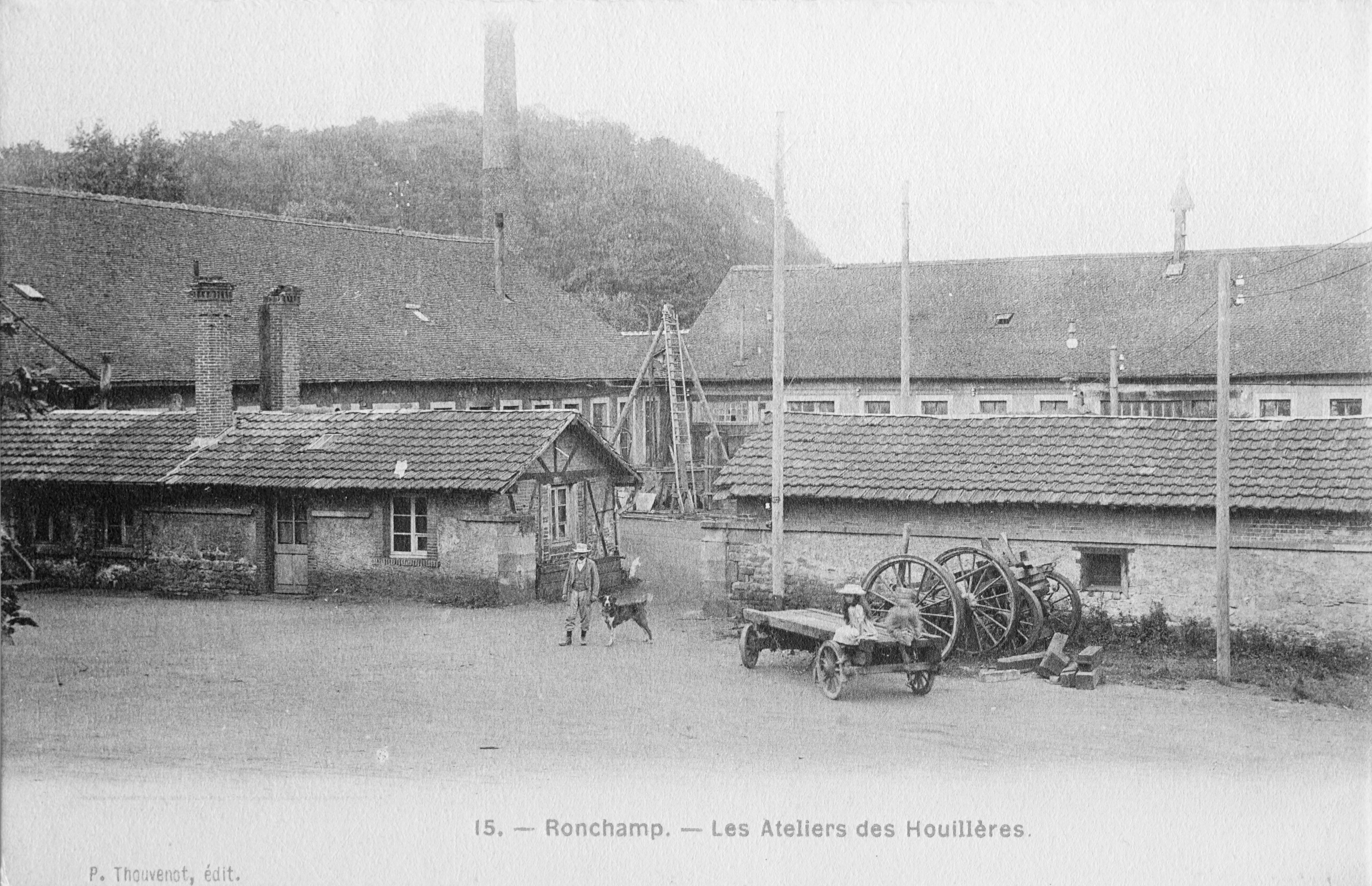
Workshops.

=== MagLum ===
Founded in Sochaux in 1923 under the name Magnéto Lumière (commonly abbreviated as MagLum), the company specialized in the manufacture of components for the automotive industry. In 1958, it established operations in Ronchamp, occupying the former offices and workshops of the coal mines. The company also owned the buildings of the Arthur-de-Buyer shaft, which were used for the storage of industrial waste. One of its stated objectives was to facilitate the retraining and reemployment of former miners who had chosen not to join EDF.

MagLum primarily produced stamped sheet-metal components, including ashtrays, door handles, exhaust pipes, armrests, and handbrake handles. The workforce reached a peak of 1,150 employees in 1969. From 1970 onward, the company was unable to adapt to changes in subcontracting policies demanded by its industrial clients, resulting in a loss of business. MagLum was placed into bankruptcy proceedings in 1980 and subsequently ceased operations.

MagLum also operated sites in Gouhenans (in the former saltworks buildings), Fallon (former forge and foundry buildings), Mélecey (former saltworks), and Conflans-sur-Lanterne. The Conflans facility was later acquired by Happich, a German automotive accessories manufacturer, which produced sun visors; this site remained active at least until 2013. The Giromagny plant, formerly the Boigeol weaving mill, was taken over by a MagLum executive, Mr. Cuyl, who continued producing plastic foam dashboards and attempted to diversify into furniture production; this company has since ceased operations.

=== Somero–Gestamp ===
Following the bankruptcy of MagLum in 1980 and subsequent labor actions, the Ronchamp site was converted into a workers’ cooperative, Somero, initially associated with Setrafac, a former spinning mill. In 1997, Setrafac was dissolved and reconstituted as the new company Somero. In 2005, the site was acquired by the multinational group Gestamp Automoción, which constructed a new factory in Champagney in 2008, employing approximately 200 workers. The former Setrafac premises were acquired by the town of Ronchamp and are used as an exhibition space.

=== Reconversion ===
In 2010–2011, some of the disused MagLum–Somero buildings were temporarily repurposed to host recreational activities such as paintball, airsoft, and laser games.

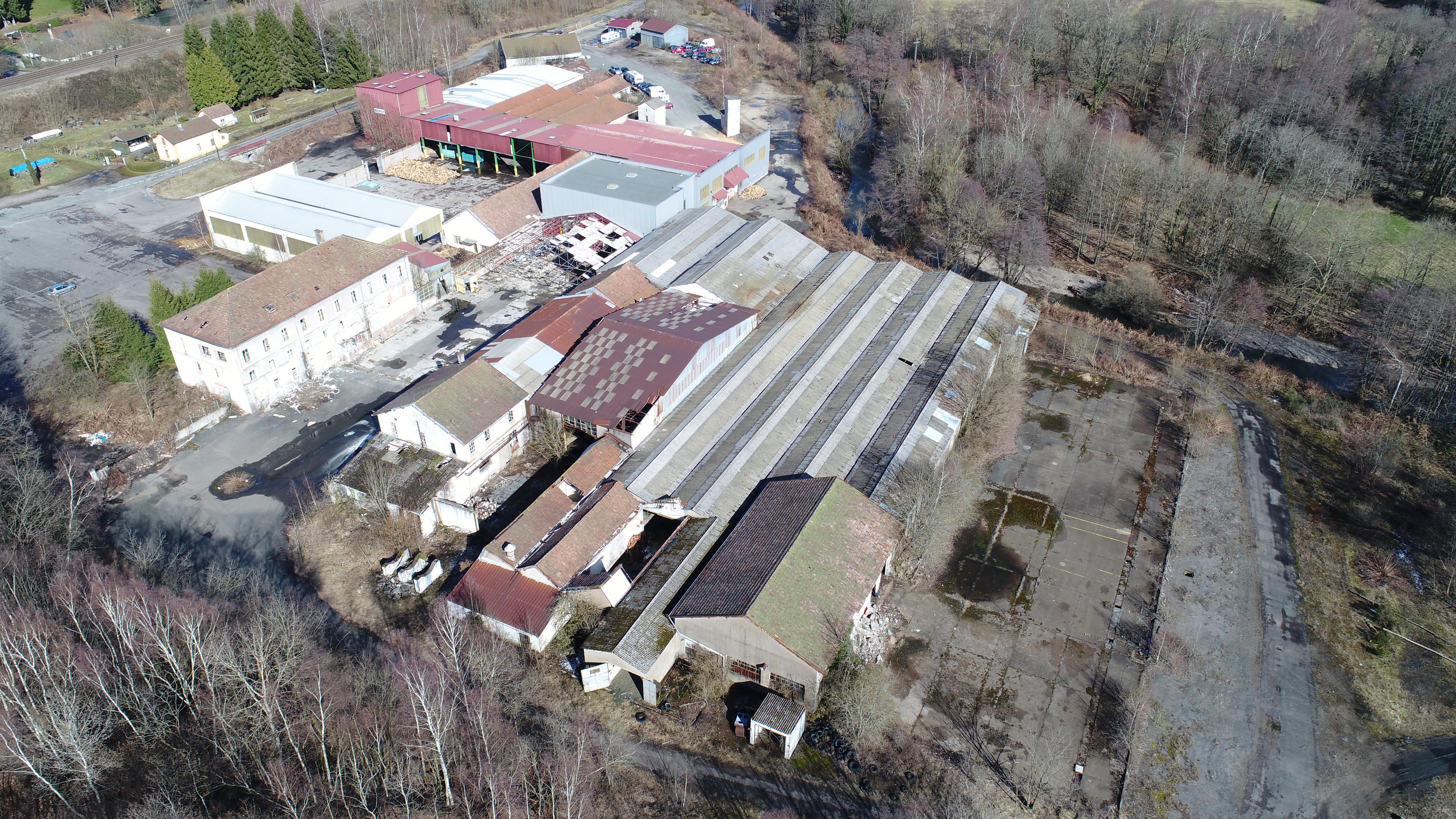
Aerial view in 2018.

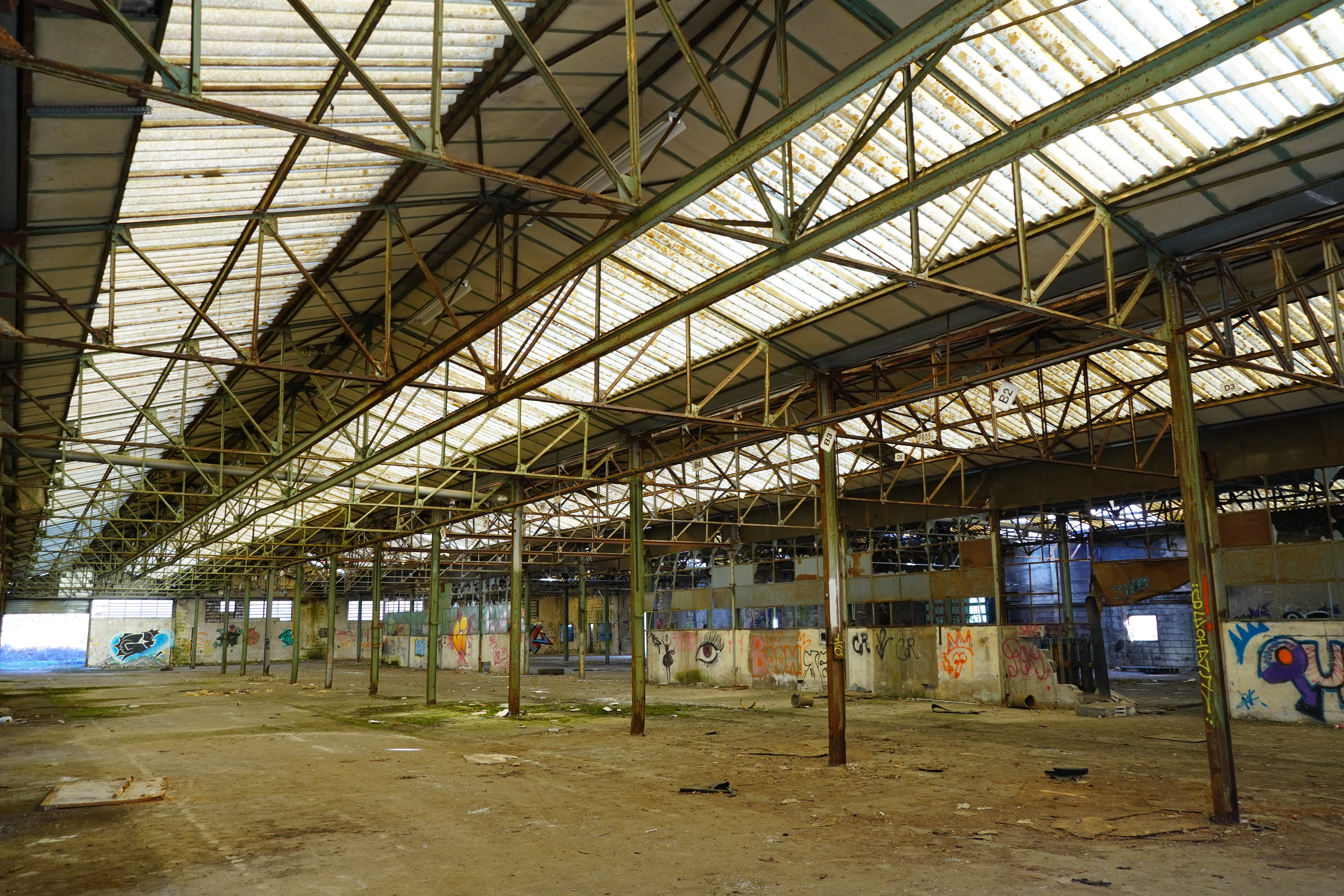
Factory workshops.

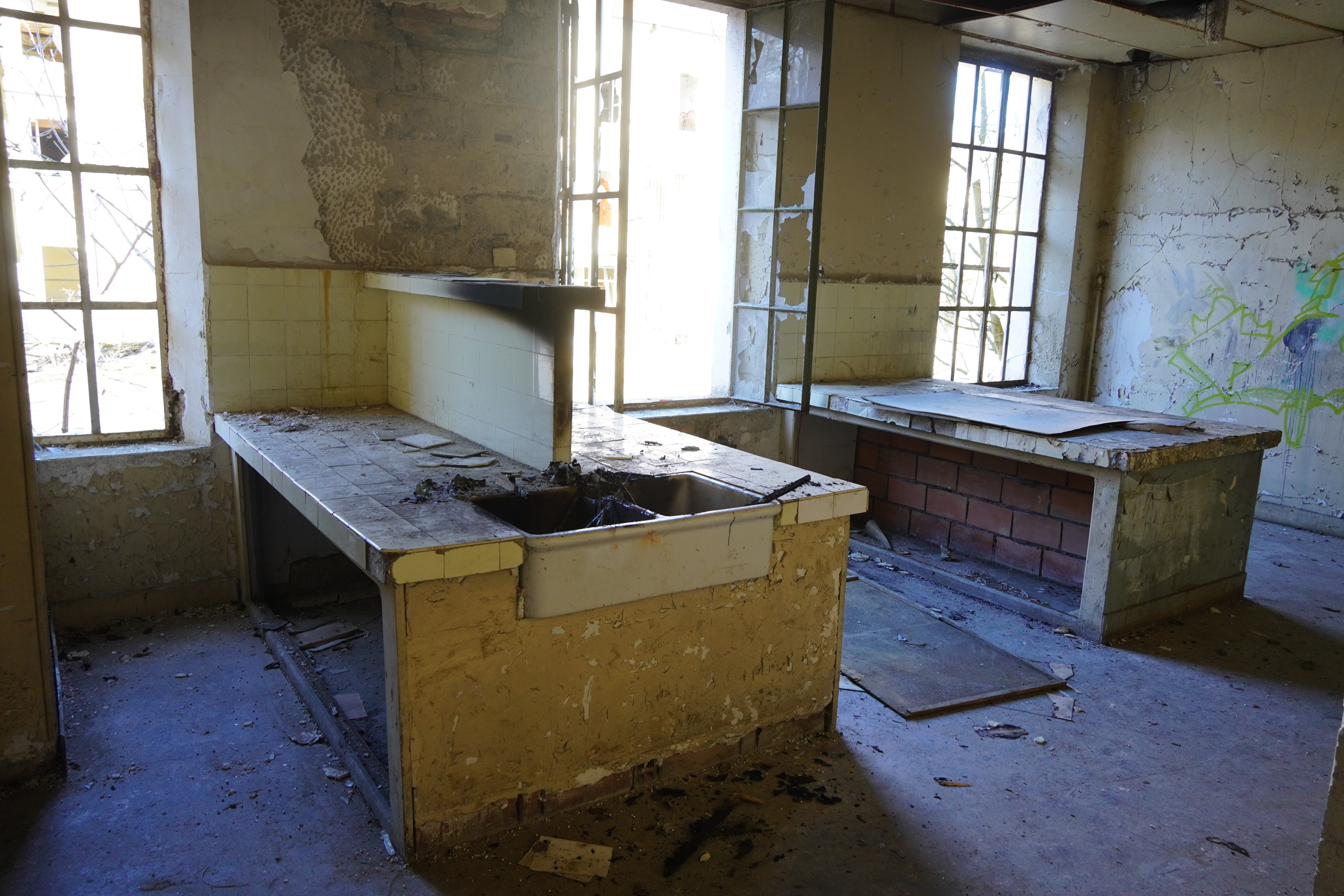
Laboratory.

The main office building, disused since 2008 and the last remaining original structure, gradually deteriorated over time. It was damaged by a minor fire on 25 April 2017 and later destroyed by a larger fire on 13 December 2021.

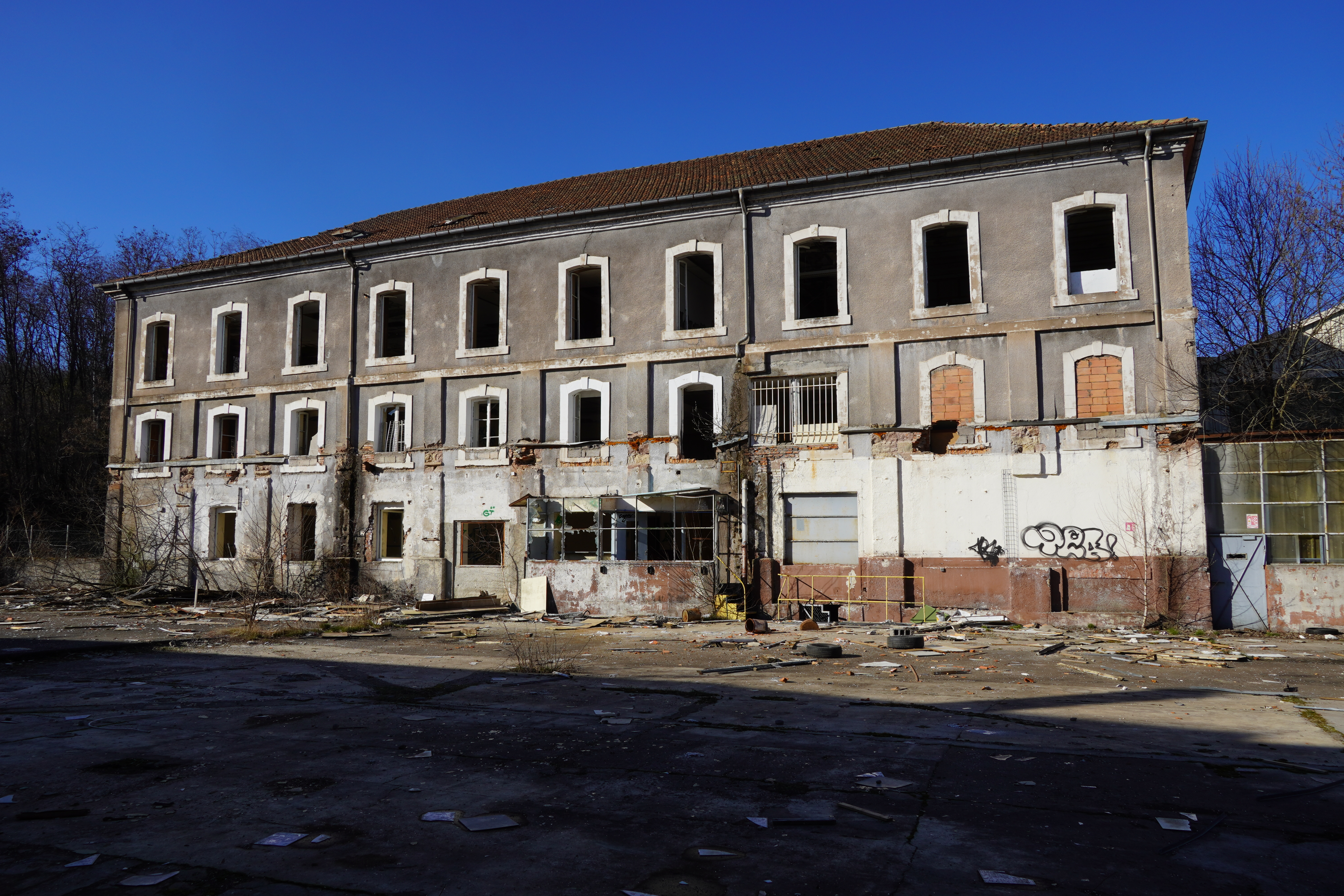
The offices in February 2021 (rear facade).

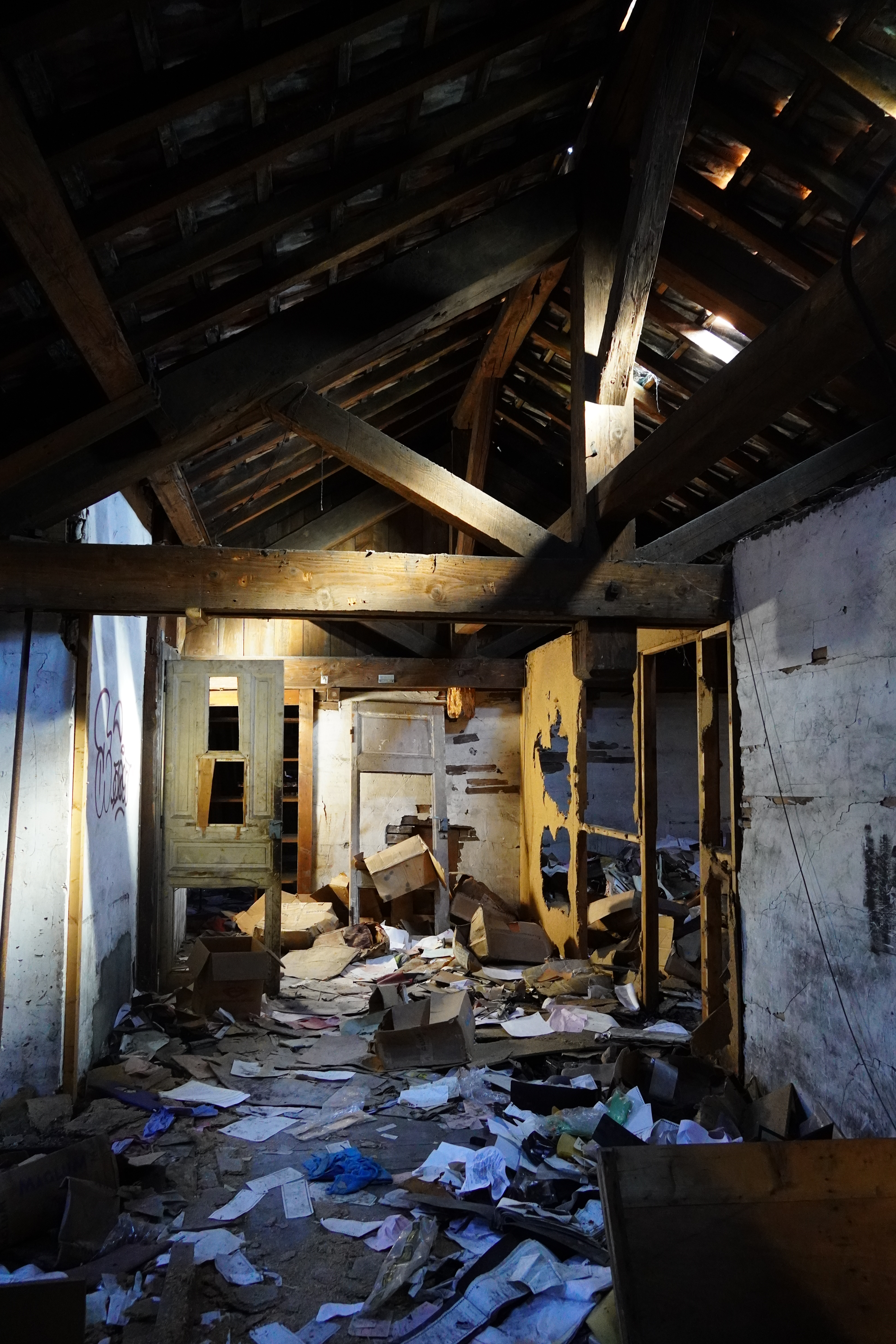
Attic space.

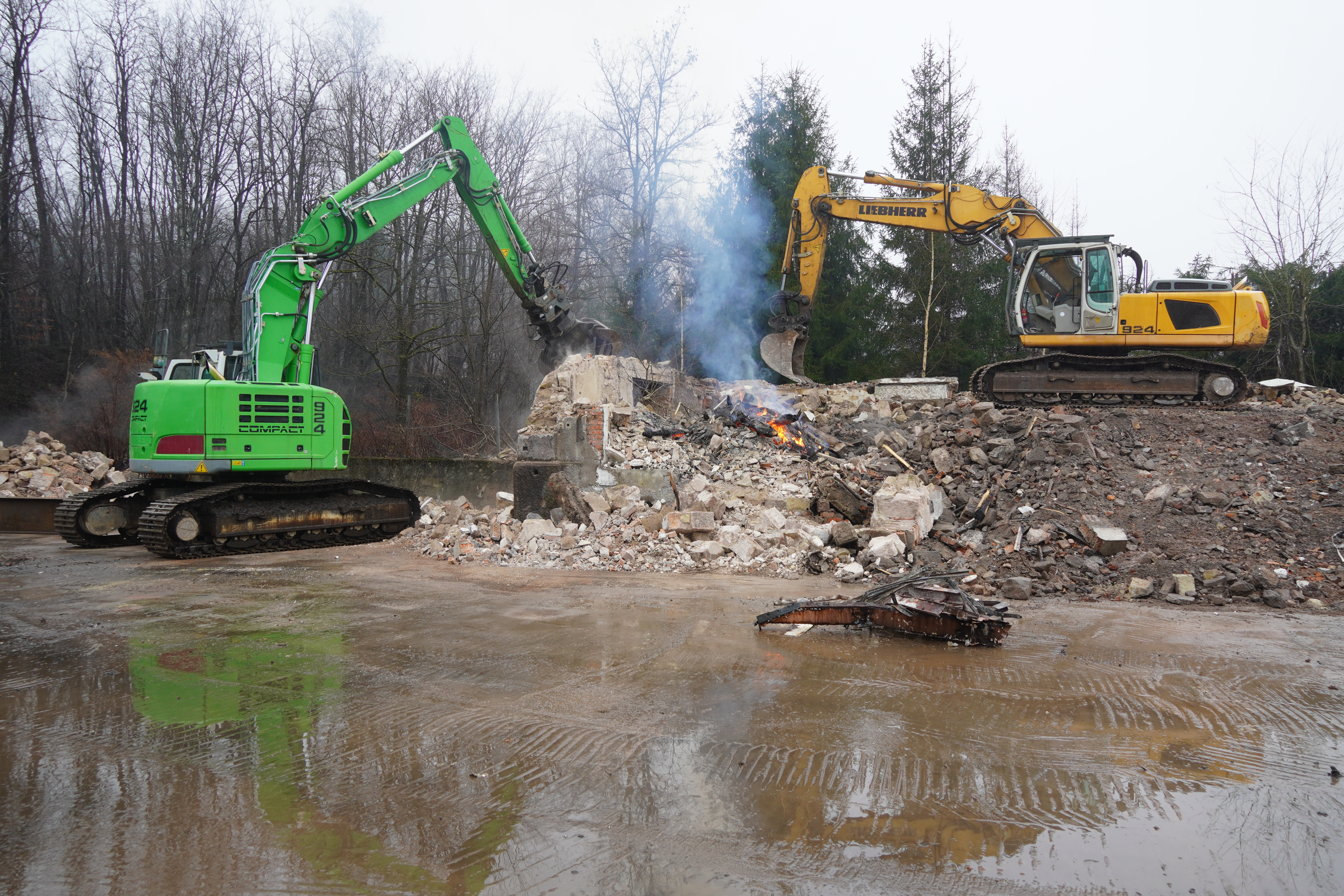
The end of demolition.

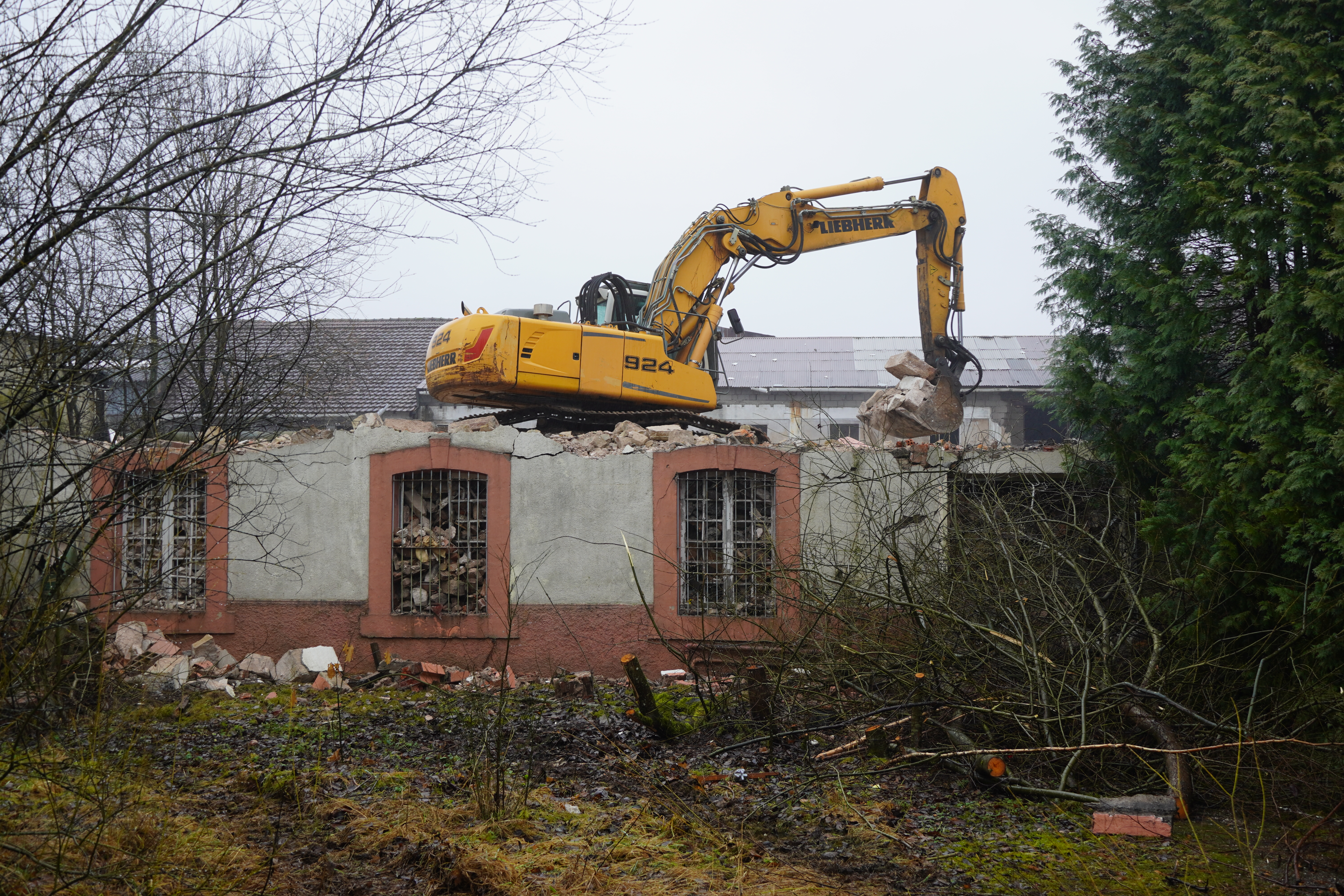

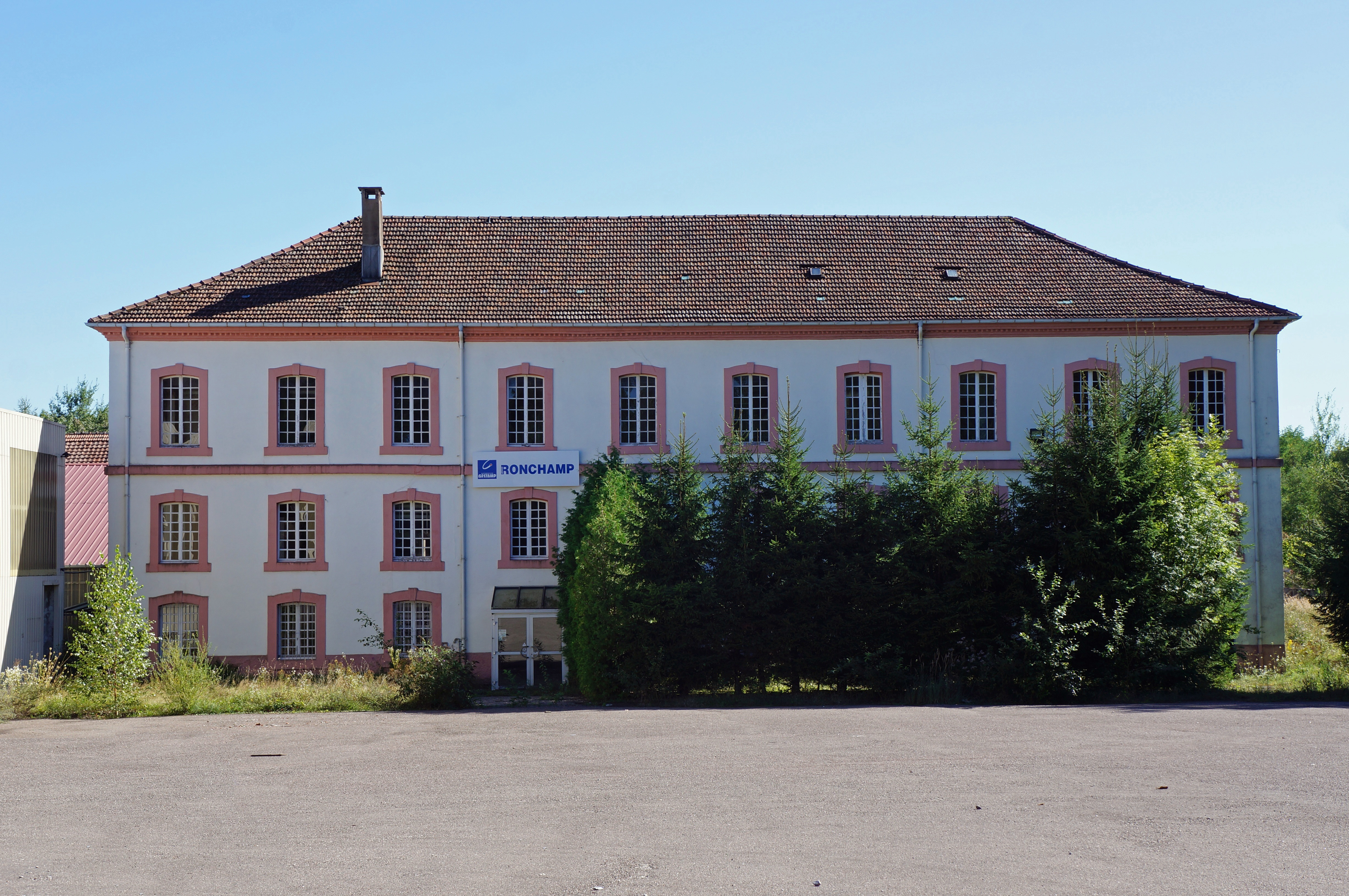
The former offices of MagLum (later Somero and finally Gestamp) in 2012. The logo of the last company is still visible on the façade.

== See also ==
- Ronchamp coal mines
- Ronchamp coal mine railway

== Bibliography ==
- Parietti, Jean-Jacques (2001). Les Houillères de Ronchamp vol. I : La mine [The Ronchamp Coal Mines, Vol. I: The Mine] (in French). Vesoul: Éditions Comtoises. ISBN 978-2-914425-08-7.
- Parietti, Jean-Jacques (2010). Les Houillères de Ronchamp vol. II : Les mineurs [The Ronchamp Coal Mines Vol. II: The Miners] (in French). fc culture & patrimoine. ISBN 978-2-36230-001-1.
- Parietti, Jean-Jacques (1999). Les dossiers de la Houillère 2 : Le puits Arthur de Buyer [The files of Coal Mine 2: The Arthur de Buyer shaft] (in French). Association des amis du musée de la mine.
