= Gestamp =

Spanish multinational automotive engineering company

Gestamp Automoción, S.A.

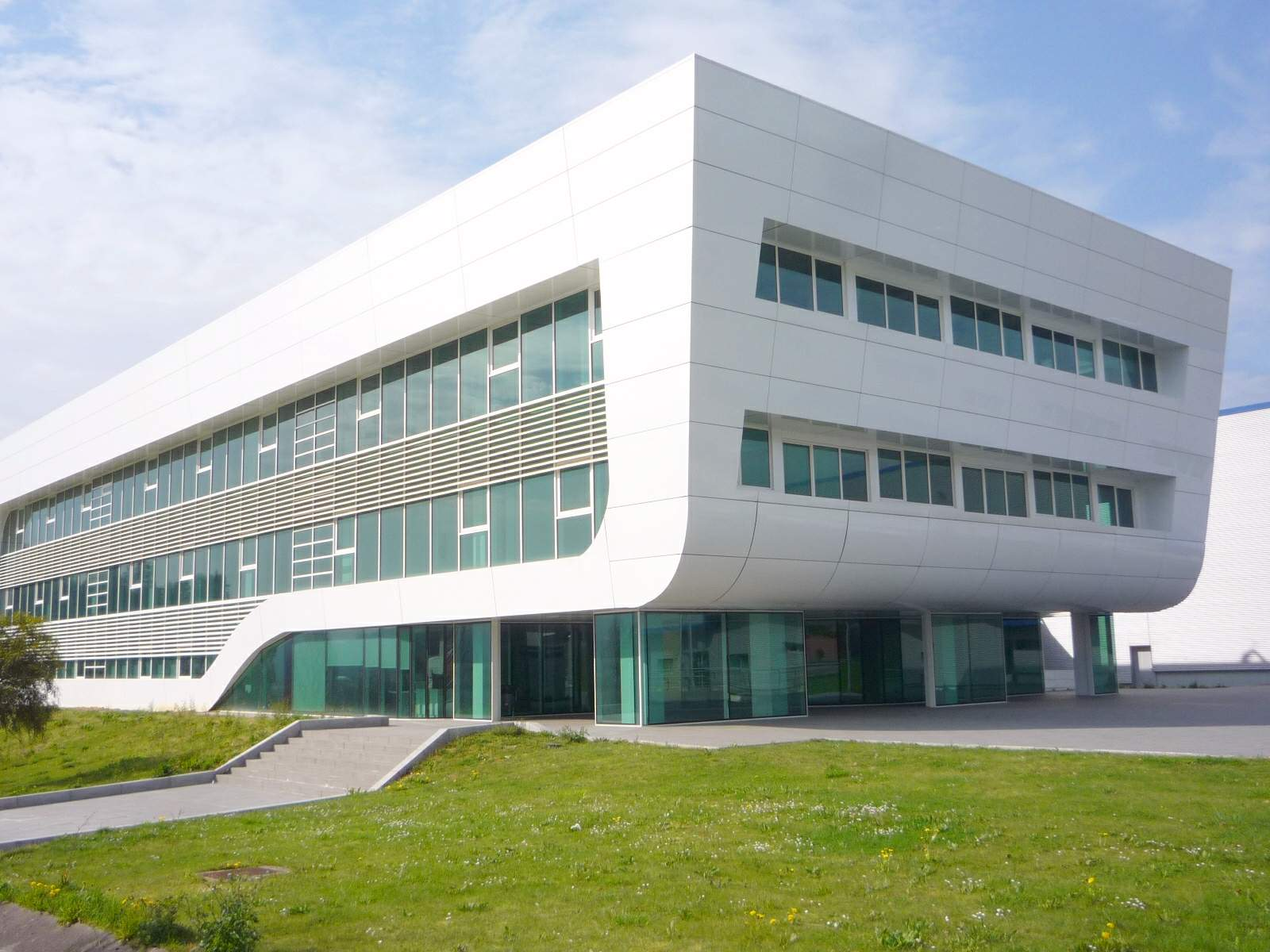
- Operational headquarters in Zamudio, Spain
- Company type: Sociedad Anónima
- Traded as: BMAD: GEST
- ISIN: ES0105223004
- Industry: Automotive
- Founded: 1997
- Headquarters: Madrid, Spain
- Key people: Francisco José Riberas (chairman and CEO)
- Products: Structural chassis assemblies (crossmembers), hinges
- Services: Laser beam welding, hot stamping, cold stamping, HSS stamping, roll forming, hydroforming
- Revenue: ▲€9.602 billion (2019)
- Operating income: ▼€503.963 million (2019)
- Net income: ▲€295.512 million (2019)
- Total assets: ▲€8.847 billion (2019)
- Number of employees: ▲43,938 (2019)
- Website: www.gestamp.com

Gestamp Automoción, S.A. simply known as Gestamp is a Spanish multinational automotive engineering company. It is one of leading firms in the European automotive industry.

== History ==
Corporación Gestamp, Spain's largest automotive supplier steel company was founded in 1997, as a spin-off of Gonvarri, created in 1958; it is wholly owned by the Riberas family.

When Gestamp Automoción was formed, it exclusively supplied SEAT. It had begun from Gonvauto in 1991.

On 29 April 2011 Gestamp Automoción bought ThyssenKrupp Metal Forming (TKMF), formerly owned by ThyssenKrupp, the large German international company. The ThyssenKrupp division employed around 5,700 people.

== Structure ==
It is based in Madrid in the Alfonso XII street just in front of the Retiro´s park.

It has over 100 production plants in 21 countries -

- 45 in western Europe
- 17 in eastern Europe
- 13 in North America
- 13 in South America
- 17 in Asia

It has 13 R&D centres.

== Products ==
- Structural components of automobiles (crossmembers)

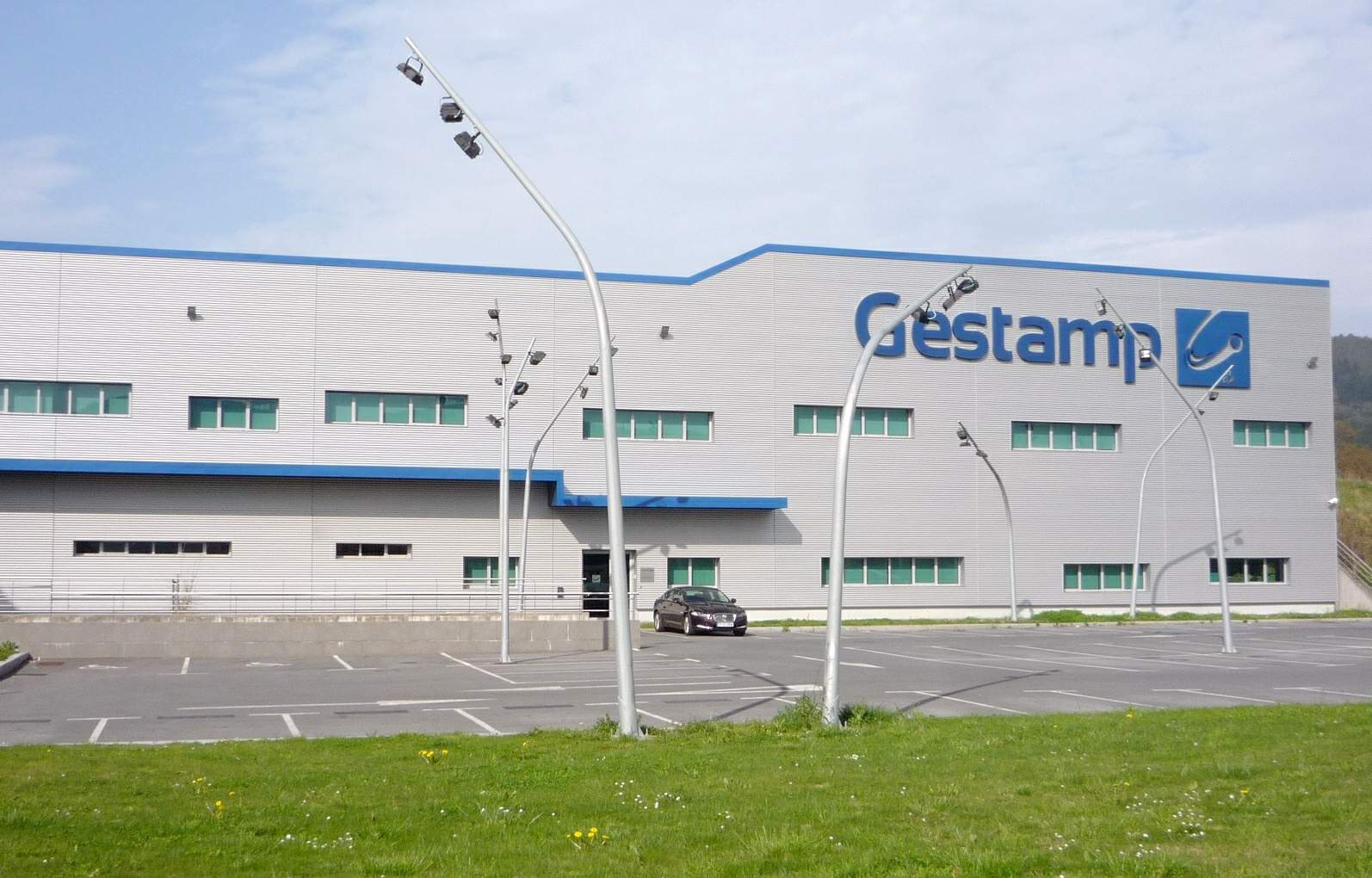
View of the operational headquarters in Zamudio

== See also ==
- Automotive industry in Spain
