= Coal mines and saltworks of Mélecey =

French mining site

Coal Mines and Saltworks of Mélecey
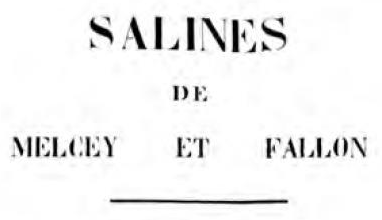
- Founded: 1843
- Defunct: 1865 (coal); 1873 (salt)
- Headquarters: Mélecey, France
- Products: Bituminous coal, halite

The Mélecey coal mines and saltworks were located in the Keuperian basin in the department of Haute-Saône, within the Bourgogne-Franche-Comté region of eastern France. Coal was extracted in the communes of Mélecey and Fallon from 1778 to 1865, and rock salt from 1850 to 1873. Locally mined coal was used to evaporate brine, reducing the production cost of salt. In 1865, a firedamp explosion in the Buissons-Brûlé mine resulted in ten fatalities and led to the cessation of coal extraction in the concession.

Although the site was exploited for a relatively short period compared to the broader salt-mining history of the Haute-Saône region, the buildings remained intact into the early 21st century. This preservation is notable, as the Gouhenans saltworks are in ruins, and no visible remains exist at the Saulnot site. Coal extraction in the area also left several small slag heaps.

== Location ==
The concession covered 480 hectares for coal extraction and 1,458 hectares for salt extraction, distributed across the communes of Mélecey, Fallon, Grammont, and Villargent, in the southeastern part of the Haute-Saône department, within the Bourgogne-Franche-Comté region.

== Geology ==
The coal and halite deposits exploited in Mélecey are located within the Keuperian coal basin of Haute-Saône, which is characterized by alternating layers of sandstone, variegated marl, and cargneule. The salt deposit comprises three layers, totaling approximately 8 meters in thickness and interspersed with saline marl, at an average depth of 135 meters below sea level. The coal deposit also consists of three layers, with a total thickness of 0.6 meters, interspersed with dark schistose clay at an average depth of 30 meters.

== Saltworks ==
=== History ===
Following the denationalization of the saltworks in 1841, a concession request was submitted in April 1843 by the Marquis de Raincourt and Messrs. Legrand, Félix, Dupré, and Bégeot. The application included plans to construct an evaporation facility with 28 furnaces and a total evaporation surface of 1,040 m². The concession was granted on 29 September 1843.

A mine shaft, 3.2 meters long and 1.8 meters wide, was constructed starting on October 10, 1845. The salt mine was worked through underground mining from 1850 to 1862, followed by brine evaporation from 1863 to 1872 to extract halite. Due to the thinness of some layers, conventional mining was not sufficiently profitable. The extracted ore was dissolved with sprayed freshwater and evaporated in surface facilities. A 17-horsepower steam engine was installed in 1849, and a steam boiler was added in 1850 for brine evaporation. Coal supplies were supplemented by the Gémonval and Vy-lès-Lure coal mines, with the latter providing four-fifths of its output to the saltworks in 1858.

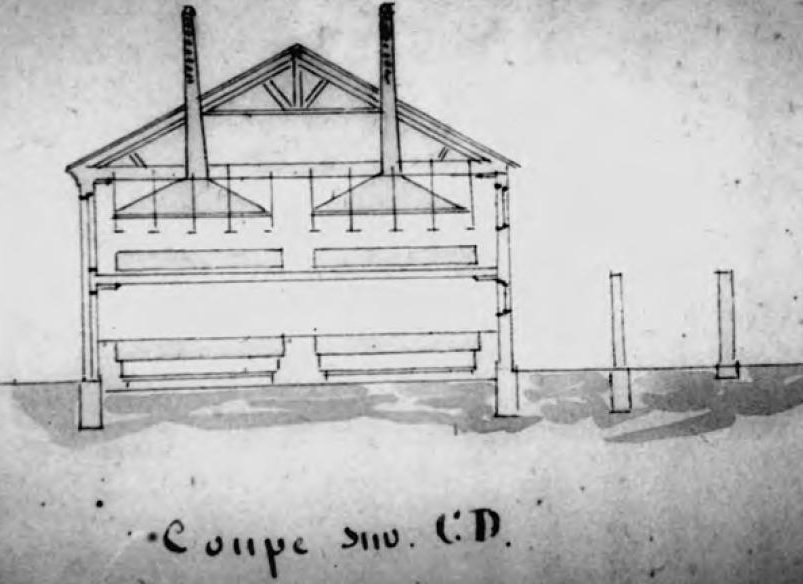
Cross-section of the evaporation building.

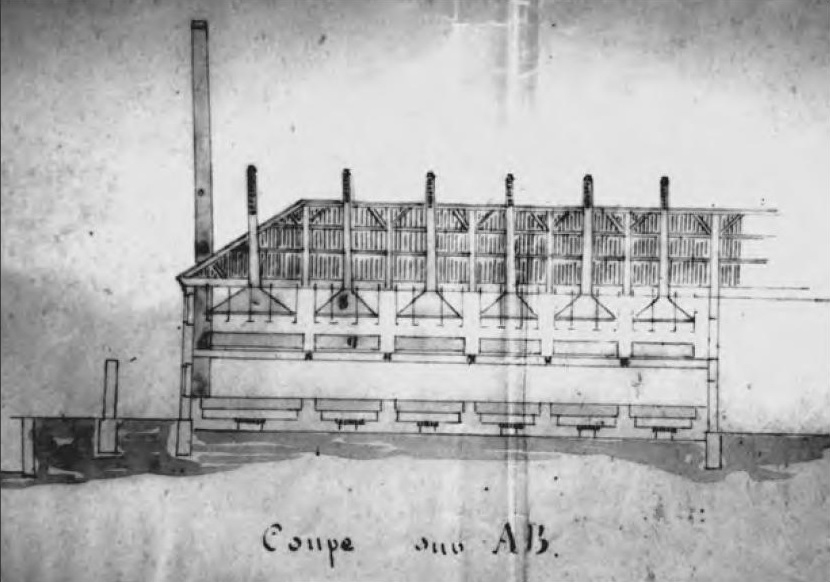
Another cross-section of the same building.

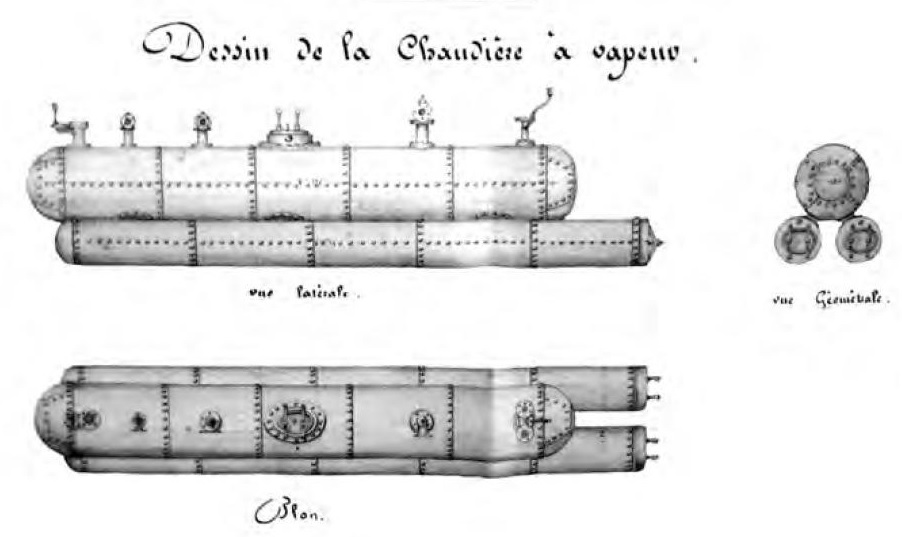
The steam boiler in the saltworks.

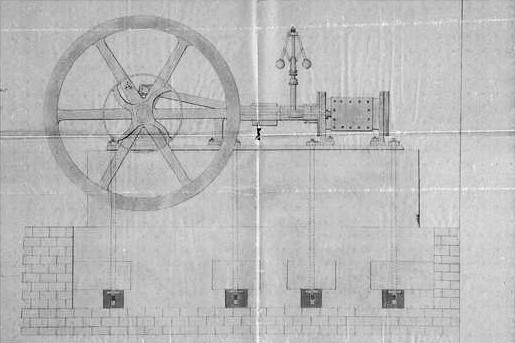
The steam engine.

Around 1850, the salt mine employed nine miners working in three rotating eight-hour shifts, with the company supplying 50 kg of blasting powder monthly, while workers provided their lamp oil. Additional staff included two unloaders, a carpenter, and a blacksmith. Ventilation at the mine's base was facilitated by a hydraulically powered bellows. In October 1845, a pulley used for hoisting buckets failed, resulting in the death of one miner and serious injury to another.

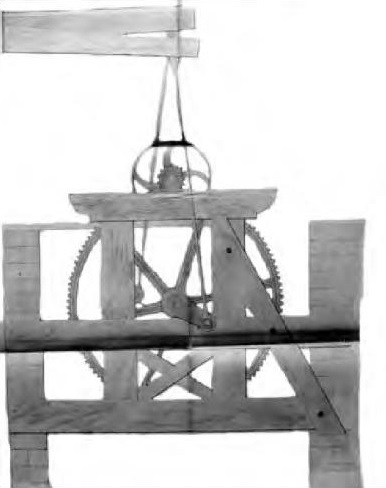
A steam-powered bilge pump.

The extraction shaft, 150.2 meters deep with a 12.5-meter sump, connected directly to the saltworks building. It had a usable cross-section of 3 × 1.35 meters, divided into three compartments: one for bucket extraction, one for miners' ladders, and one for drainage, handling up to 100 hectoliters of water per hour. The shaft, timbered for the first 40 meters, reached a depth of 137 meters. A water wheel, powered by a stream from Fallon, operated three drainage pumps (including a backup) and ventilation below. Adits at the mine's base extended within a 500-meter radius, with a cross-section of 2 × 5 meters. Miners, paid 2 francs daily, extracted 1,120 kg of raw salt per shift, yielding 896 kg of refined salt, targeting only the thickest 2.4-meter layer. The deposit was explored through two adits, one westward and one northward, with reduced layer thickness beyond 60 meters from the shaft. The western adit was repurposed as a drainage reservoir after encountering a water source. Two parallel 120-meter adits were dug southward, following the salt layer’s dip.

In 1857, a 3-horsepower steam engine was installed to pump brine, as the water wheel became inadequate. From 1850 to 1862, annual production averaged 10,000 to 15,000 quintals. Mining operations ceased on July 25, 1862, as recorded by the mining inspector. In October 1862, work resumed, (Note: In salt mining, grid-patterned adits are excavated to extract salt, leaving square natural pillars. After adit excavation, these salt-containing pillars are removed in a process called dépilage.) focusing on clearing 2.5-meter square blocks.

In 1863, flooding of the adits led to the conversion of the extraction shaft into a brine shaft, a more profitable method that continued until 1872 when operations ceased due to deposit depletion, poor salt quality, and the site's unfavorable location. In 1874, an attempt to sell the mine to the Gouhenans saltworks was unsuccessful. The Eastern Saltworks intermittently pumped brine until the late 19th century.

The evaporation building was decommissioned in the early 20th century but maintained by the Compagnie des Salines de l'Est until the 1950s. A revival attempt during World War I was unsuccessful.

The saltworks around 1900.

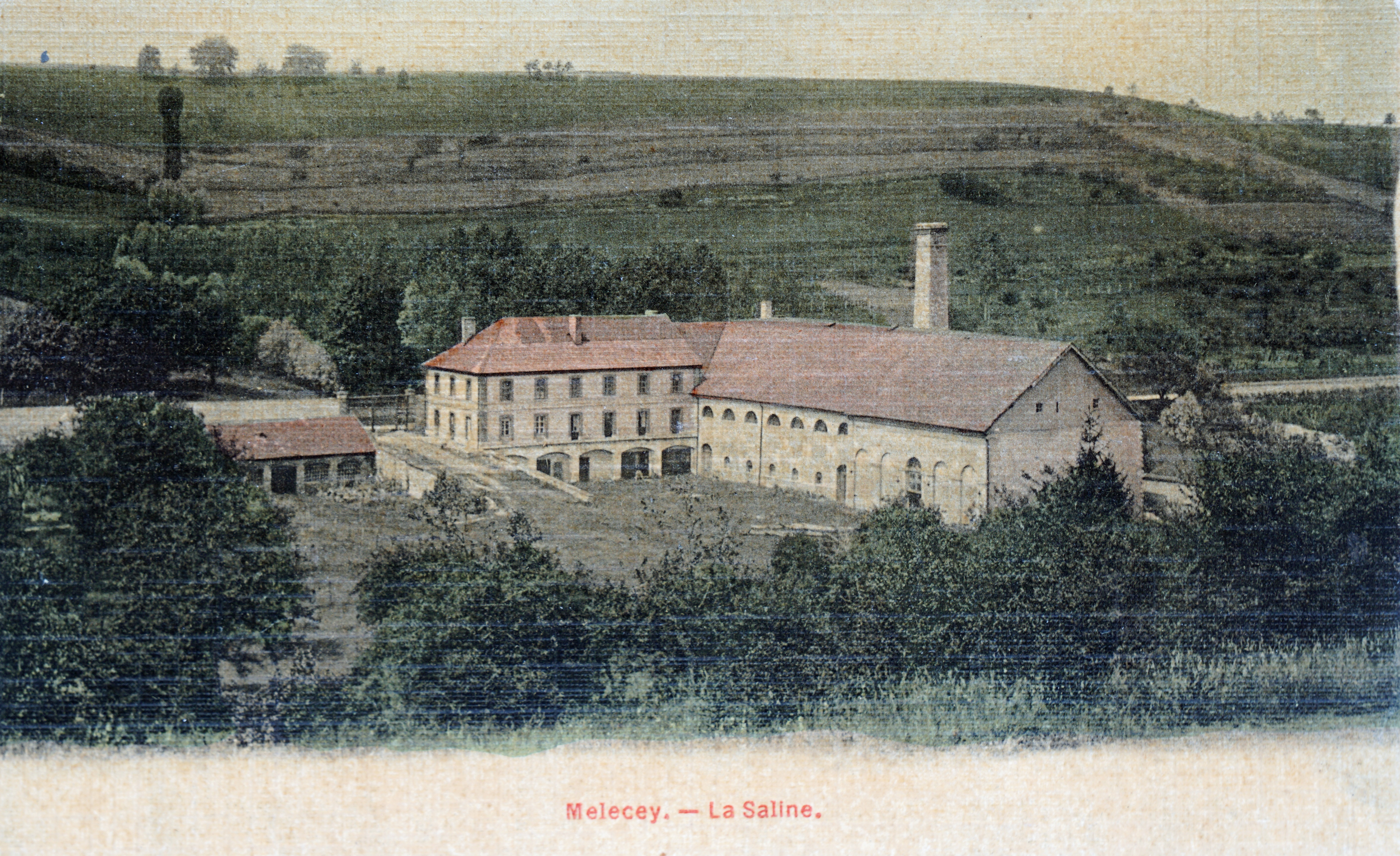

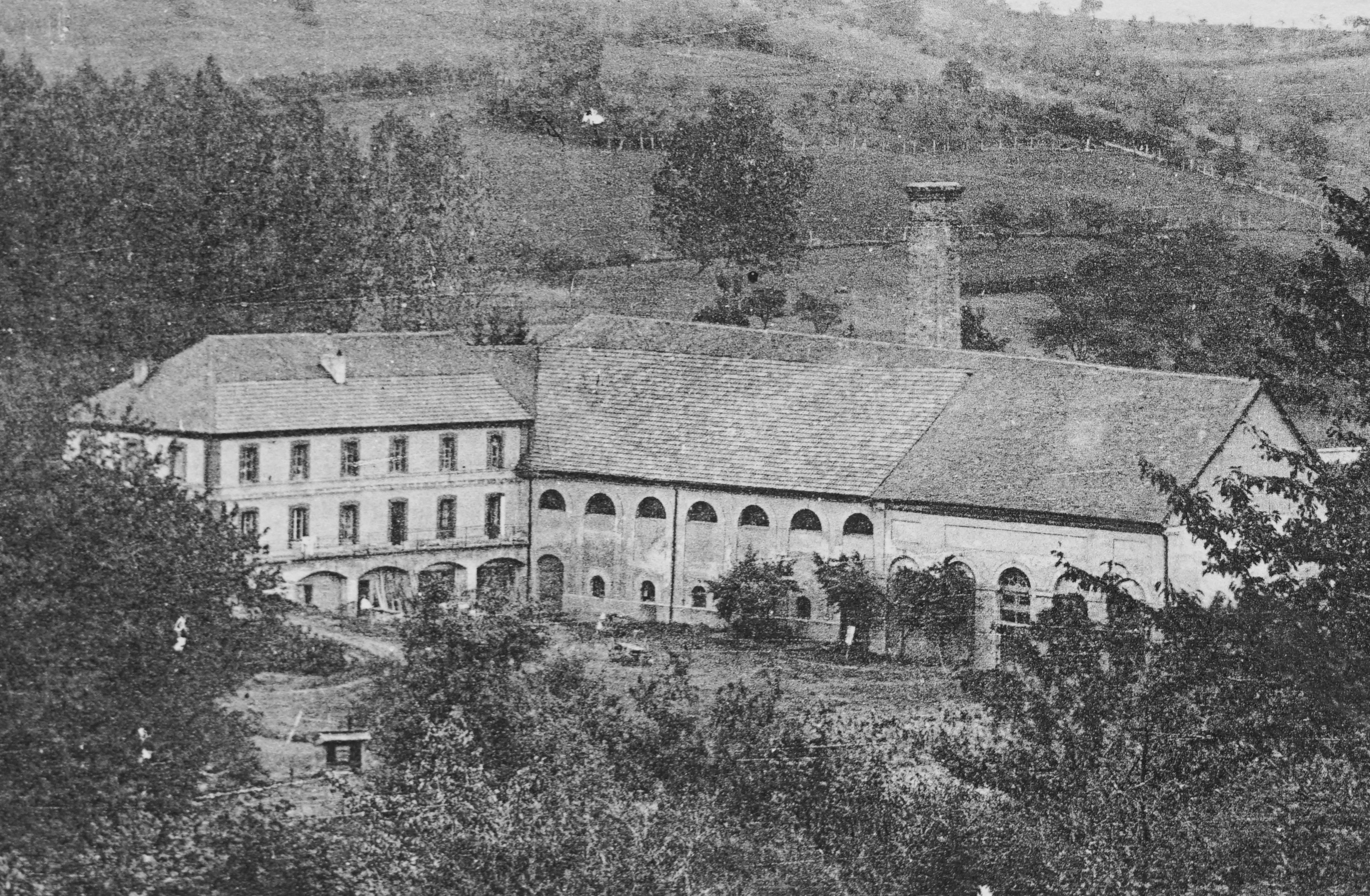

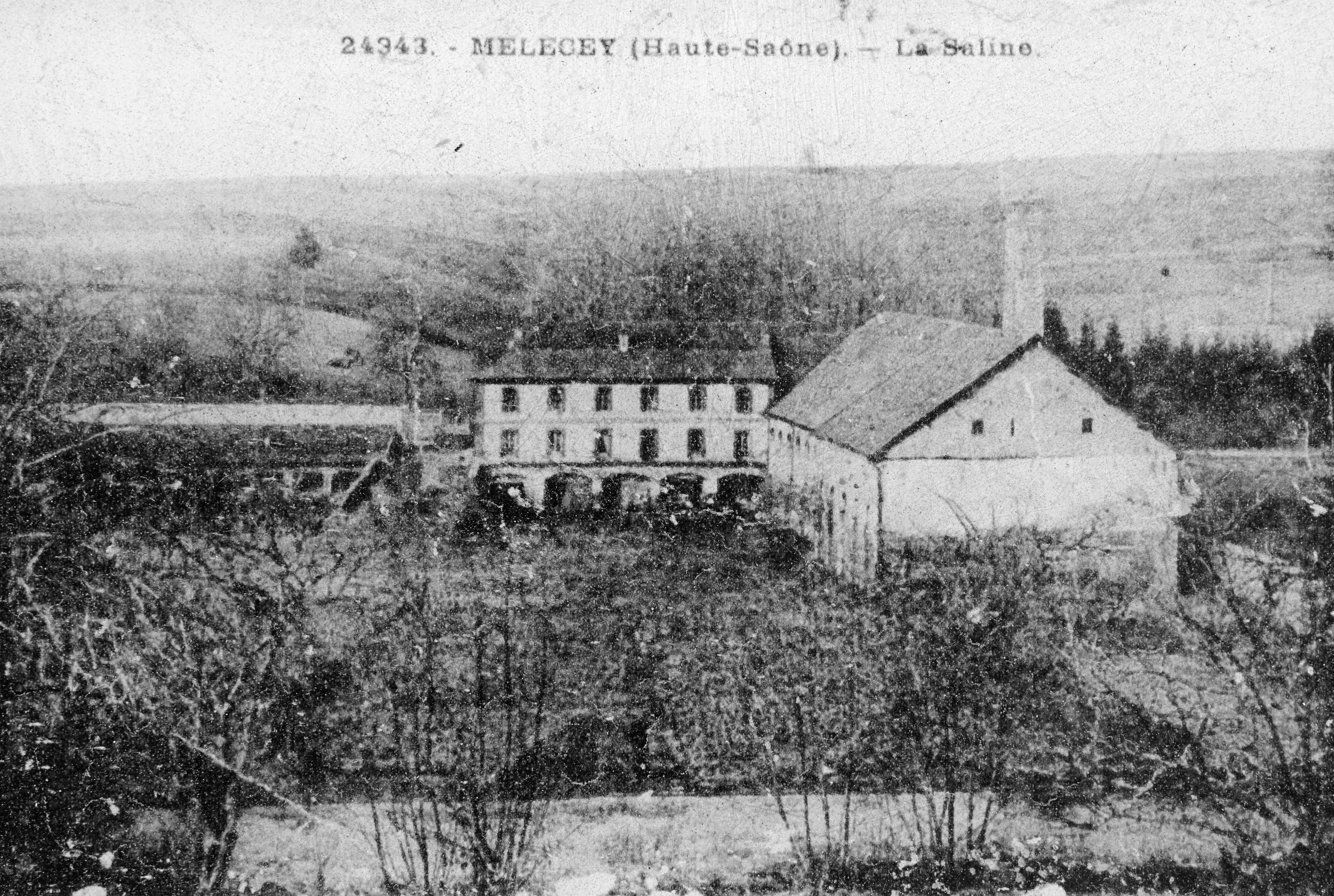

The use of coal extracted from various concessions by saltworks.

=== Production ===
The Mélecey salt mine produced a total of 20,000 tonnes of rock salt, with 8,000 tonnes extracted through dissolution.

Evolution of salt mining in the Mélecey basin
	1863	1864	1865	1866	1867	1868	1869	1870	1871
Production (approximate) in thousands of quintals	5.8	9	8.5	11.5	11.75	10.75	11	9.25	9

=== Conversion ===
Around 1950, the Mélecey saltworks were acquired by MagLum and used to store scrap metal, with its buildings subject to looting. By the early 21st century, the wooden evaporation tank building and factory chimney remained intact, distinguishing the site from the ruined Gouhenans saltworks and the vanished Saulnot saltworks. The site hosted a sound and light show and was listed in the general inventory of cultural heritage on March 11, 2010.

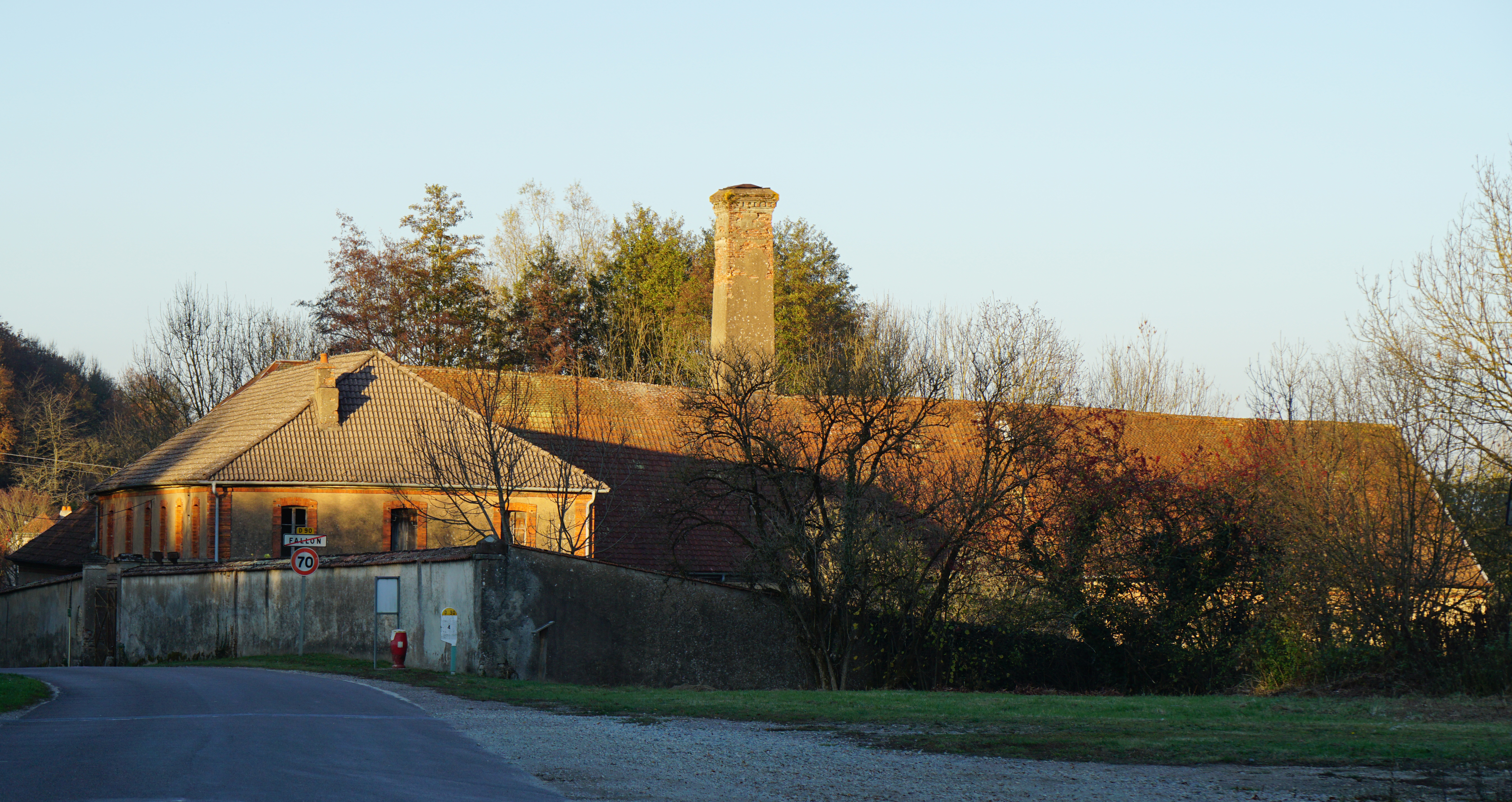
The buildings and chimney of the Mélecey saltworks.

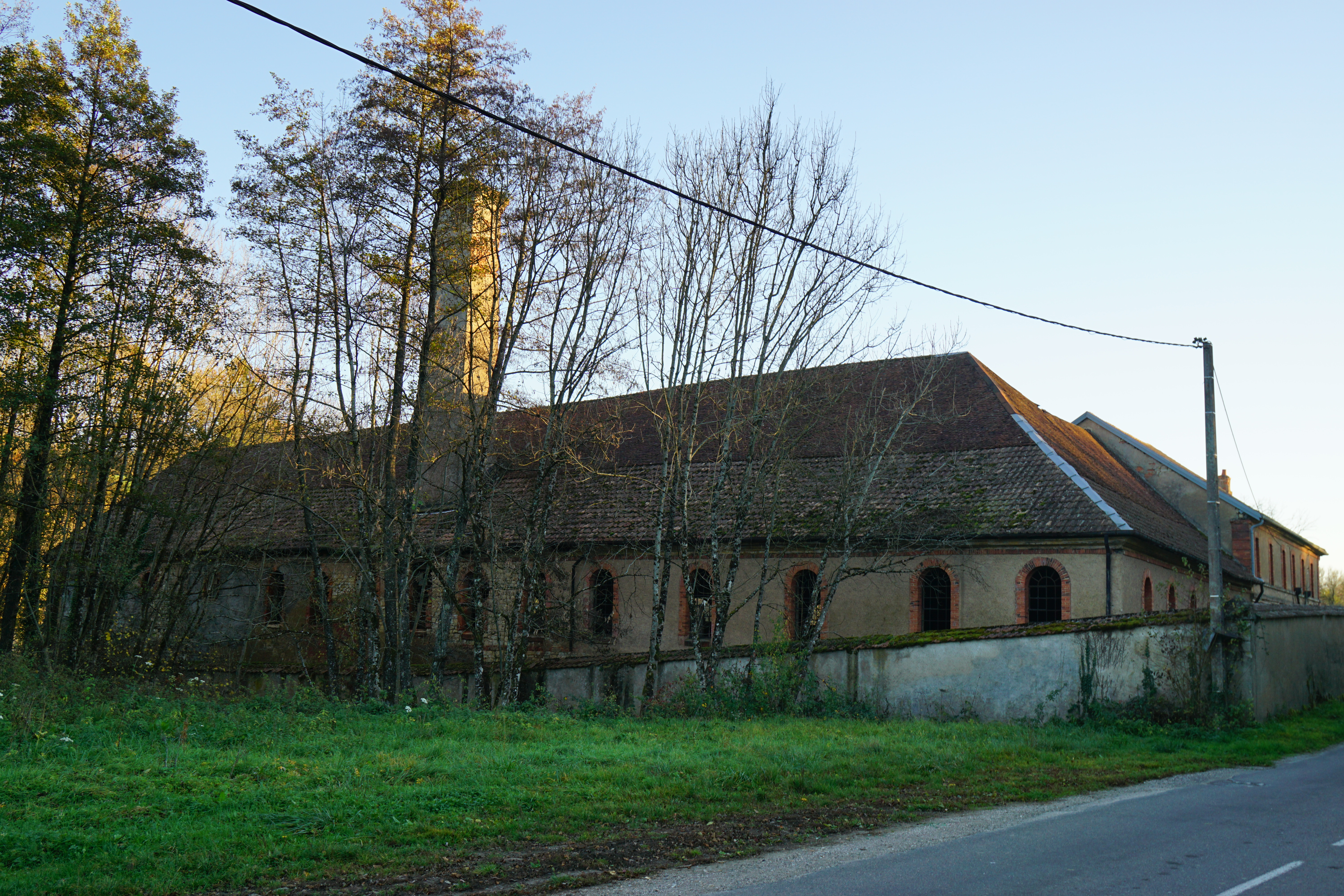
The same buildings seen from the other side.

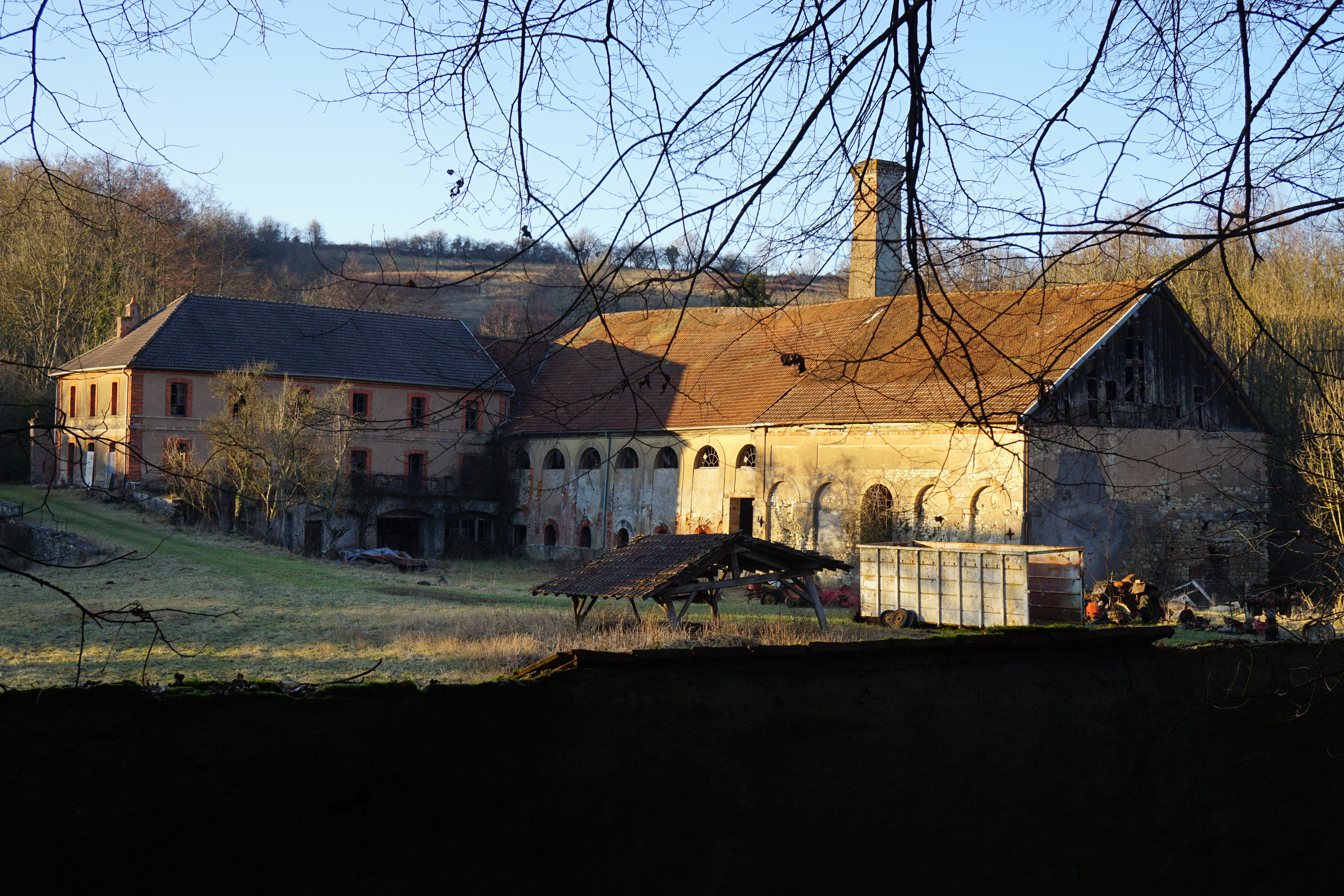
Rear view.

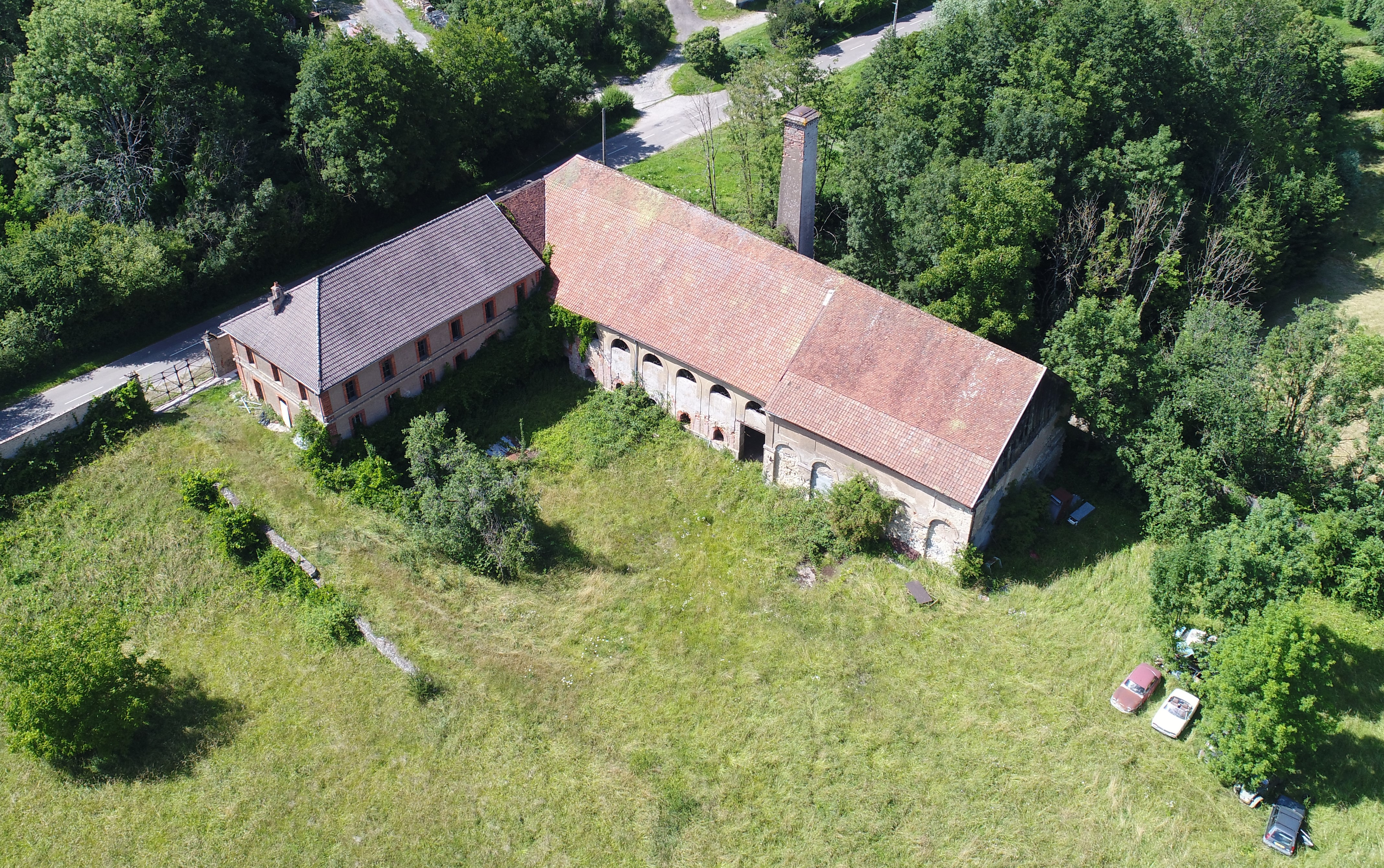
Aerial view.

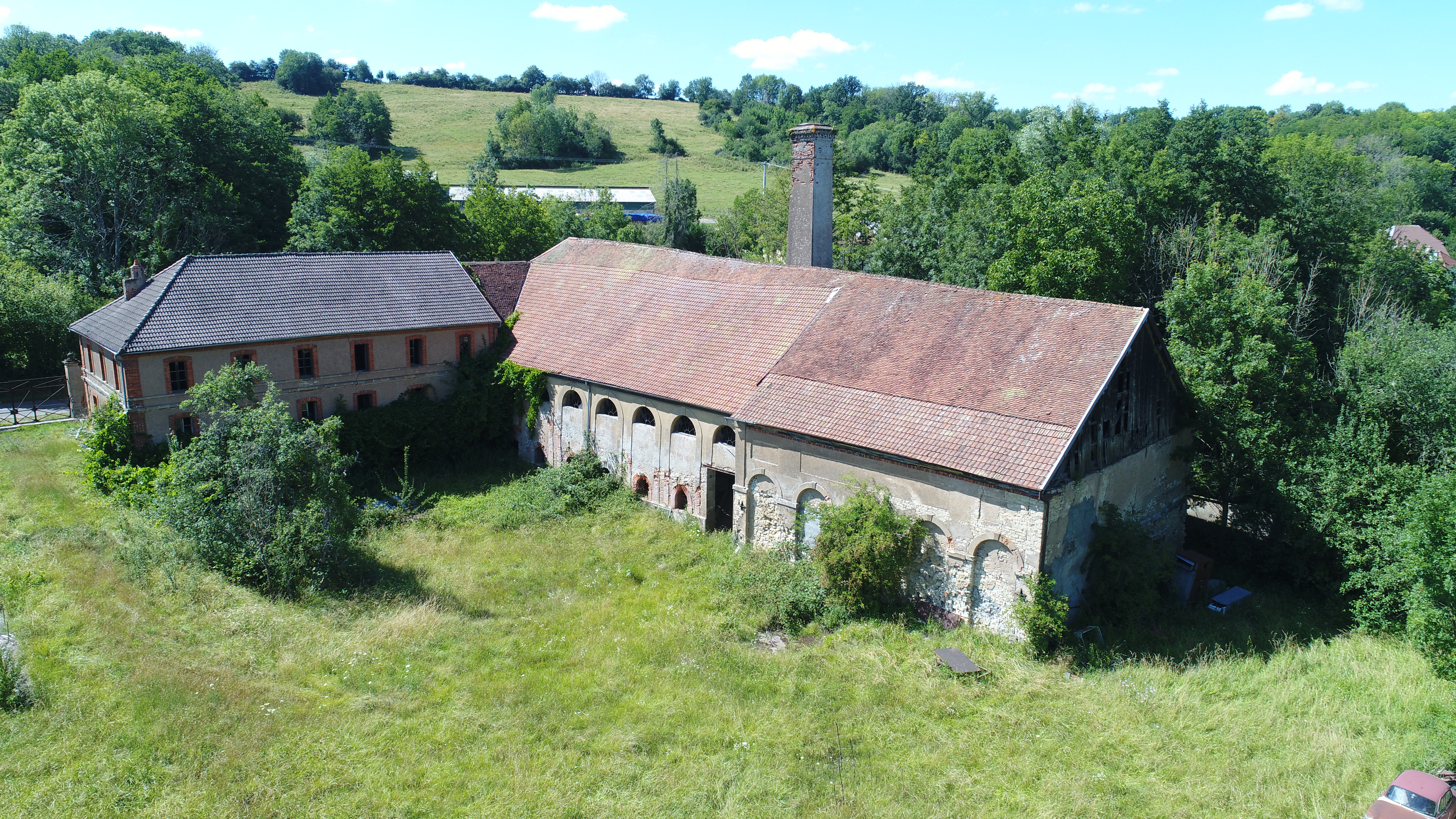
Close-up view.

== Coal mines ==
The various concessions in Haute-Saône for the exploitation of the Keuper basin.

Work on the Mélecey concession in 1843: 1. Buisson Brûlé well; / 7. adit; 2. 1827 well; / 8. 27 m well; 3. Carlotte well; / 9. 7.3 m borehole; 4. 50 m adit; / 10. 1822 shaft; 5. Peute mill; / 11. 16 m borehole; 6. 17 m well; / 12. and 13. Crays shafts.

Coal mining in the region is documented from May 24, 1773, in the neighboring commune of Abbenans. In Mélecey, coal exploration began in 1778 to support a saltworks using brine evaporation, but the coal was of low quality. In 1822, an exploratory shaft was abandoned before reaching coal-bearing strata, and a 50-meter-long adit, inclined at 20°, worked a 50 cm thick coal seam near the Carlotte shaft. In 1827, a shaft was sunk near coal outcrops. From 1838 to 1839, a 17-meter-deep shaft near Mélecey village encountered an 18 cm coal seam, and a westward adit located a 33 cm seam inclined at 30° to the south.

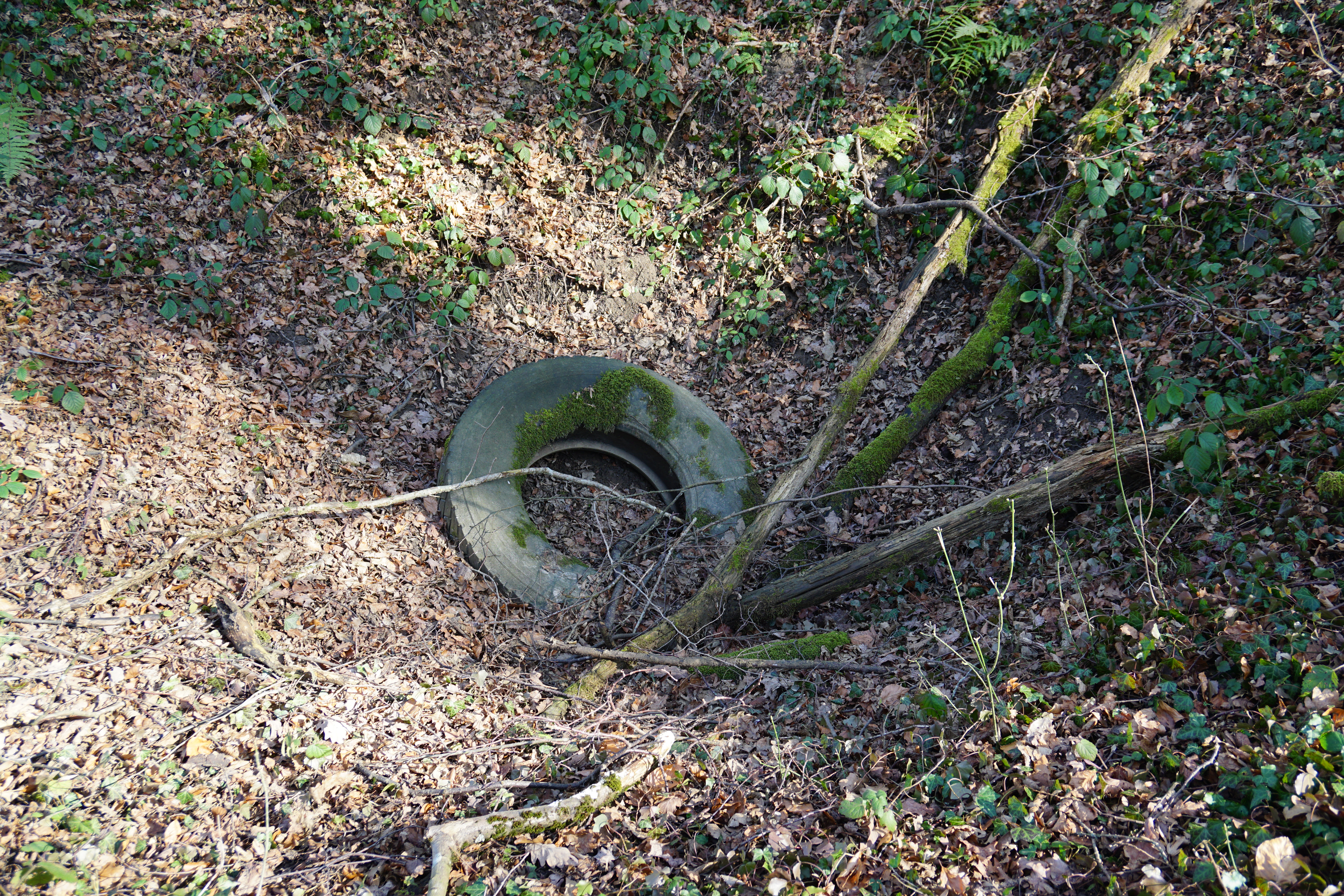
Carlotte well.

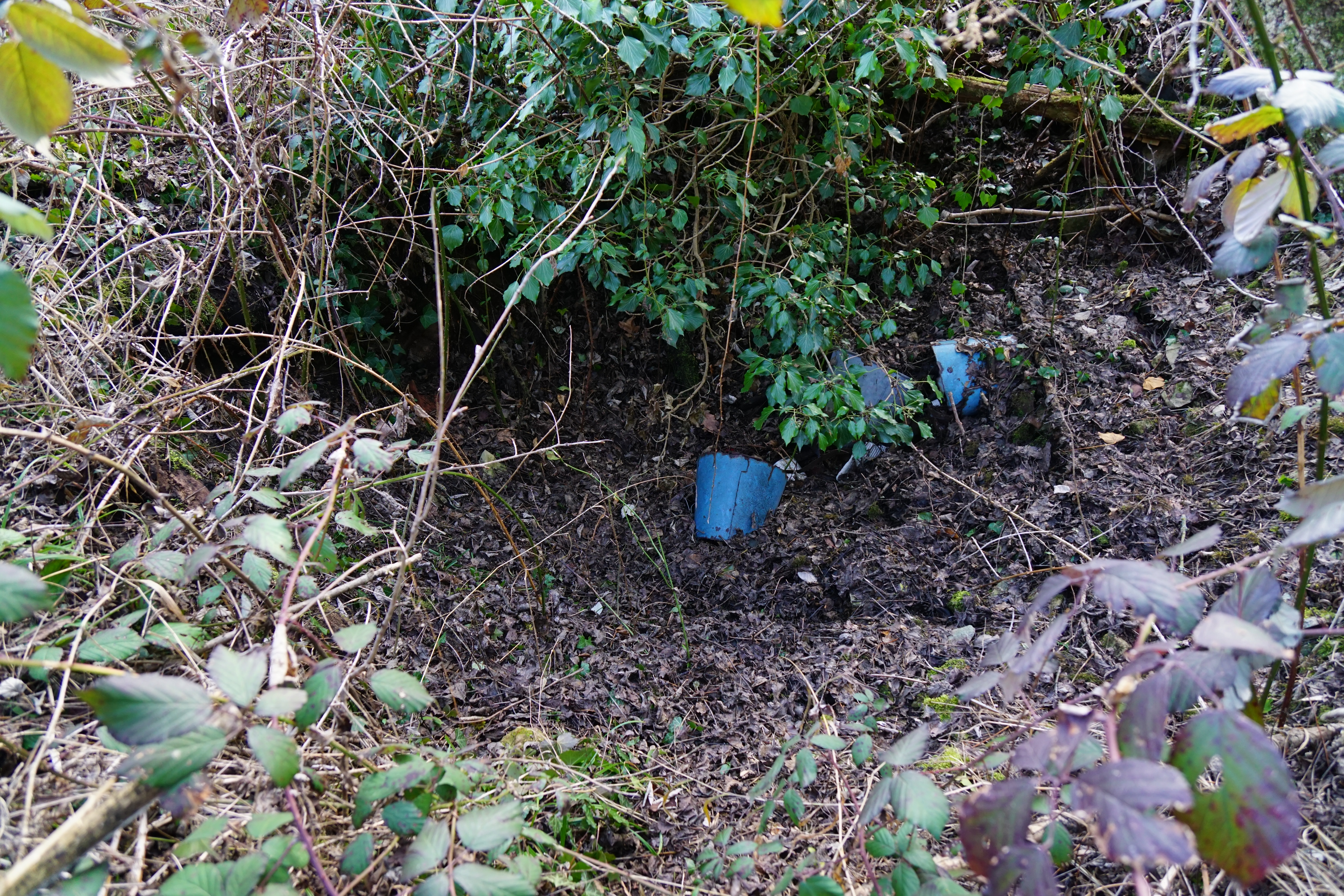
The 17-meter well.

In 1841, an exploratory shaft was dug in Mélecey by Madame Raincourt and associates, reaching a depth of 33 meters. It uncovered a 33 cm thick coal seam containing gypsum, producing coke with a metallic, blistered, and porous appearance.

The Mélecey concession, spanning 480 hectares, was granted on September 29, 1843, for salt and coal extraction. Operations included the "Buissons-Brûlé" shaft, 20 meters deep, which mined a 0.25-meter-thick coal seam using a hand-operated winch. On January 14, 1852, the "Le Fay" shaft, 12.5 meters deep, was completed, equipped with a hand winch and divided into two compartments: one for cable passage, the other for water pumping, worker access via ladder, and ventilation through a duct connected to a 4.5-meter chimney. Fourteen workers mined coal seams ranging from 18 to 30 cm thick daily. The shaft ceased operations in 1853 due to insufficient profitability.

The Mélecey coal mines, closed in 1854, were later reopened. In 1855, the "Saint-Pierre" shaft was dug at Derrière-Lachaud, employing 15 miners and 11 laborers. This led to the temporary closure of the Buissons-Brûlé shaft before the Saint-Pierre shaft itself closed in February 1857. Operations continued at a reduced pace until 1861 when a master miner from Vy-lès-Lure revitalized efforts. On July 2, 1861, a new shaft reached coal at 9.3 meters. Timbered square adits, 70 cm wide, were excavated, with wooden planks laid for improved haulage. One adit extended eastward, while three northward adits merged after eight meters. Water was removed using a manual pump, and coal was separated from waste rock in a hand-operated washhouse. The mine employed seven miners and three surface workers.

In July 1862, a new shaft was dug at the Buissons-Brûlé locality in Mélecey, with regular coal extraction starting in October. In 1864, the mine produced 556.1 tonnes of coal, sold at 1.39 francs per quintal. In 1865, a firedamp explosion at the Buissons-Brûlé mine killed ten workers, halting coal extraction in the concession. The Mélecey saltworks then relied on coal from the Gouhenans mines until its closure in 1873. Around 1874, a final shaft was dug to revive saltworks operations, but the attempt was unsuccessful.

Most shafts of the Mélecey concession were situated in the Fallon woods. One shaft caused a fire before 1943.

List of main extraction wells
Name	Depth	Activity
Buissons-Brûlé Well	20 m	1843 – 1854
Le Cray Well	12.50 m	1852 – 1853
Saint-Pierre Well		1855 – 1857
Well No. 4	9.30 m	1861 – 1865
Buissons-Brûlé Well II	23.10 m	1862 – 1865

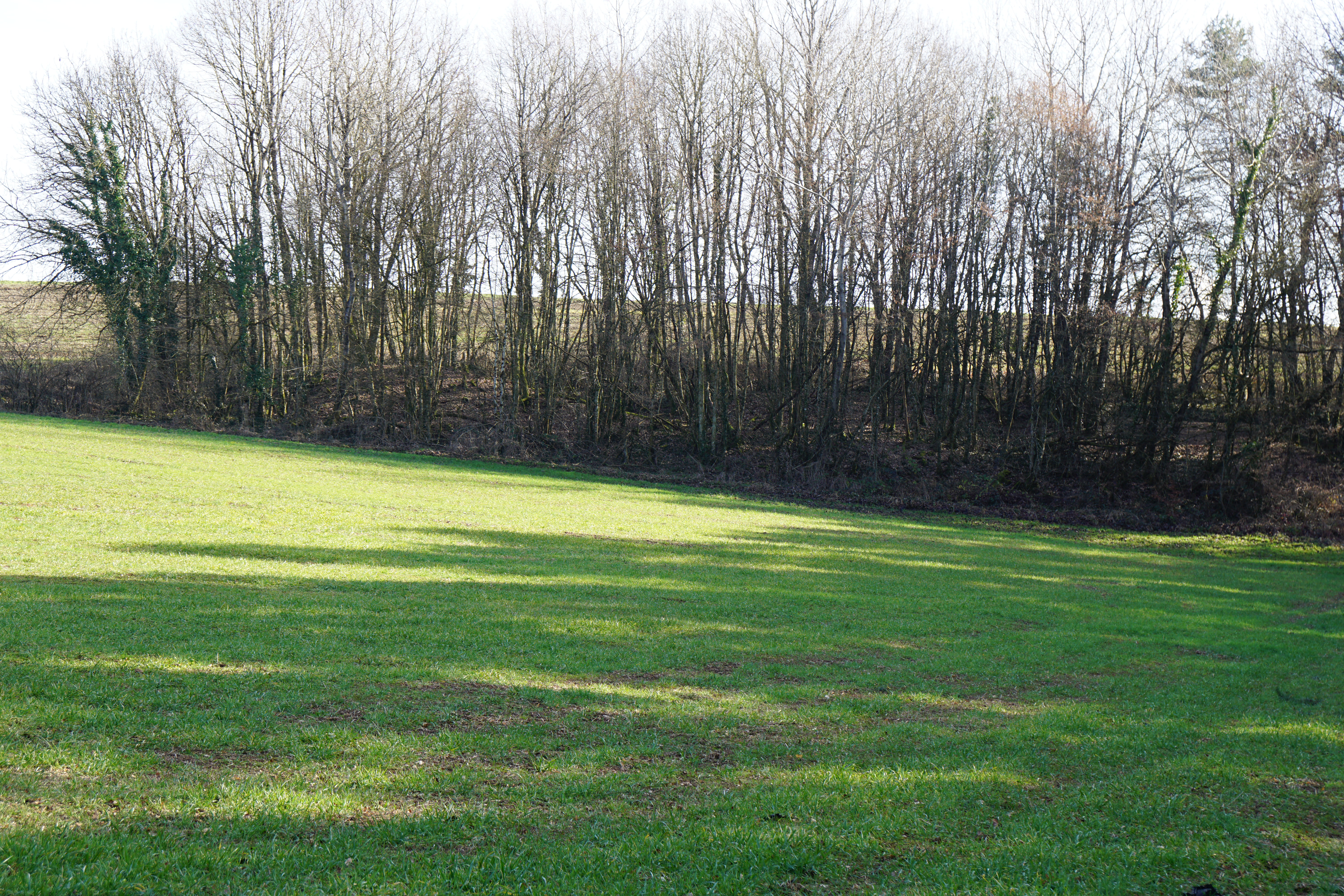
Distant view of the Saint-Pierre mine slag heap.

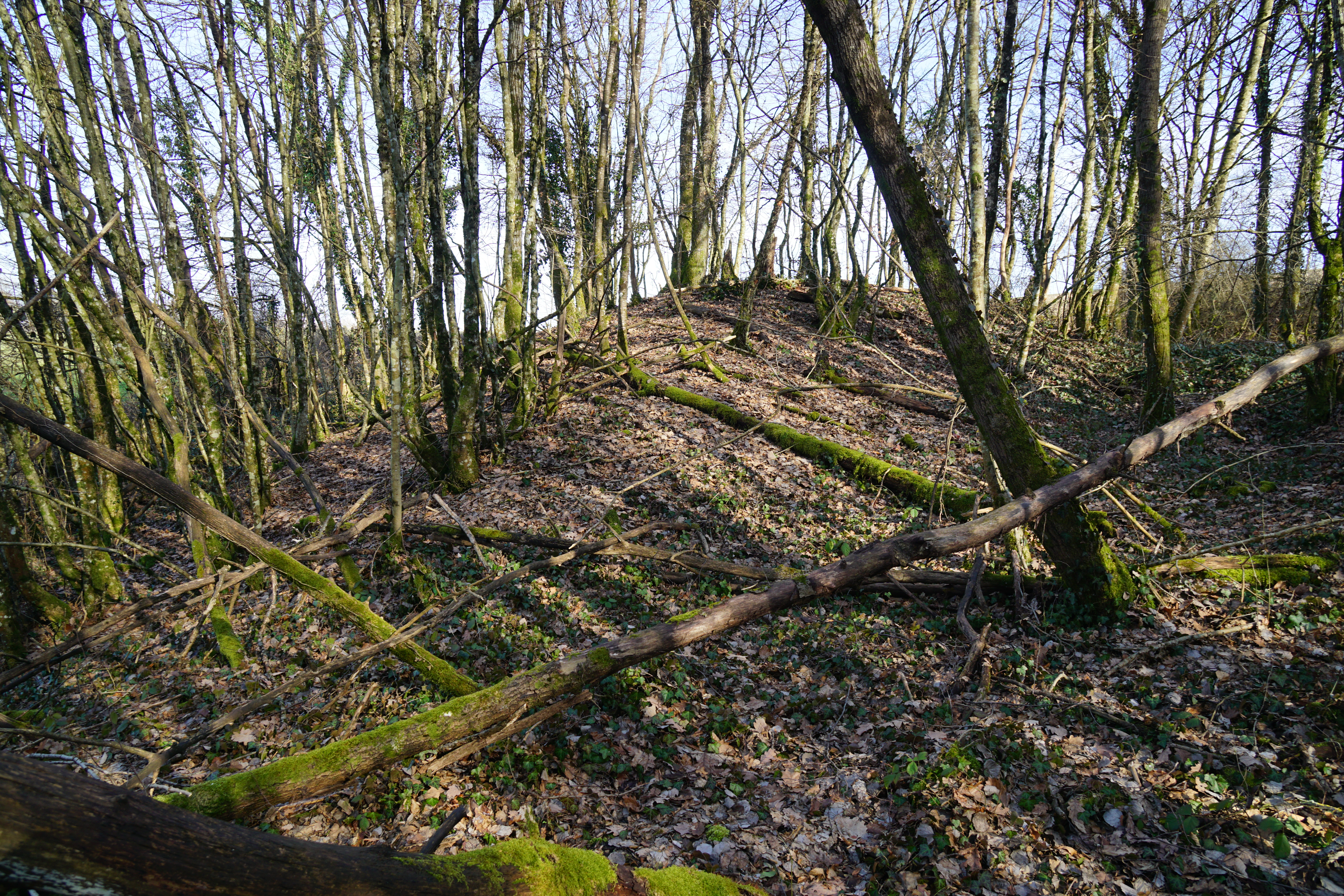
Close-up view of the Saint-Pierre mine slag heap.

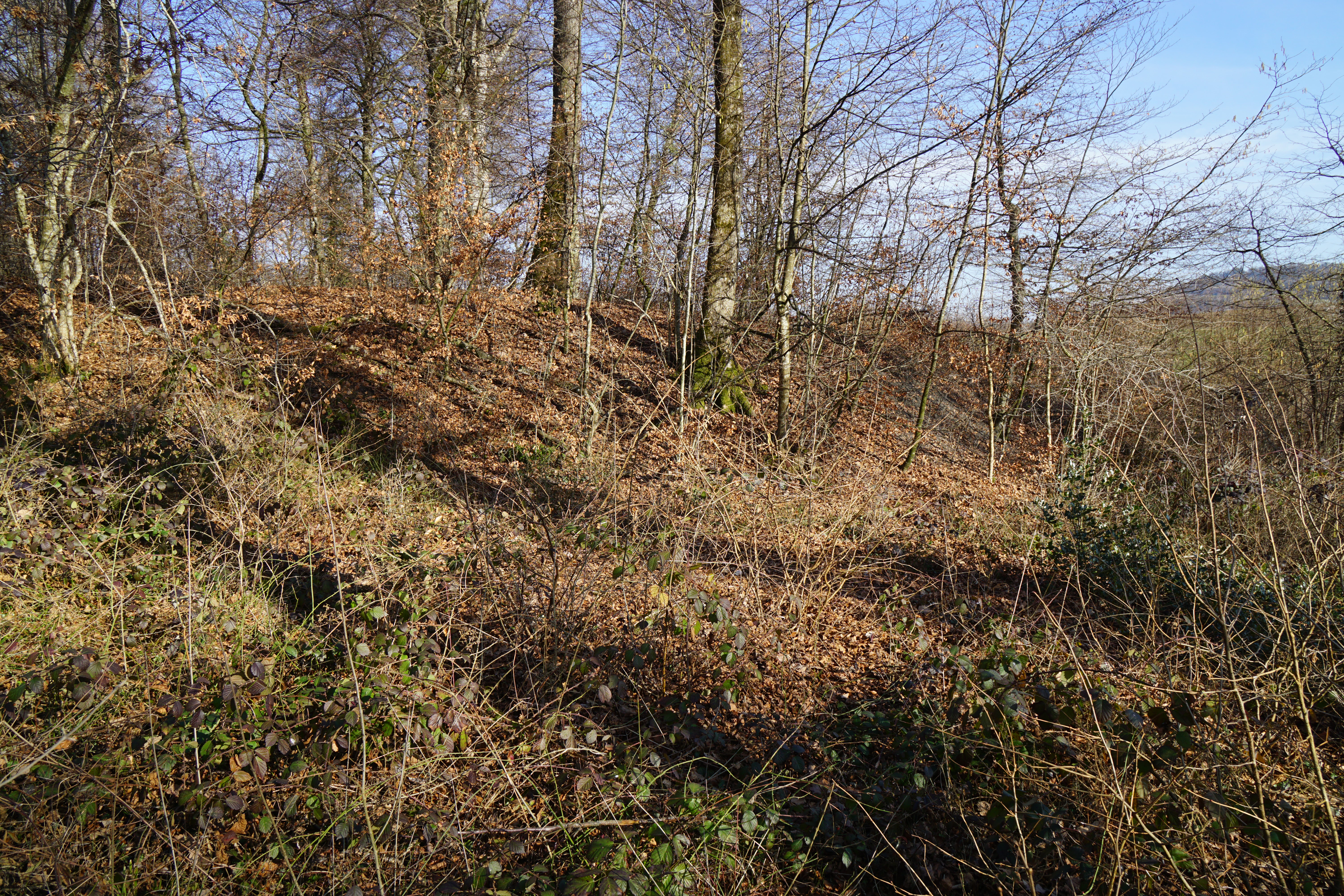
The side of the Buissons-Brûlé mine slag heap.

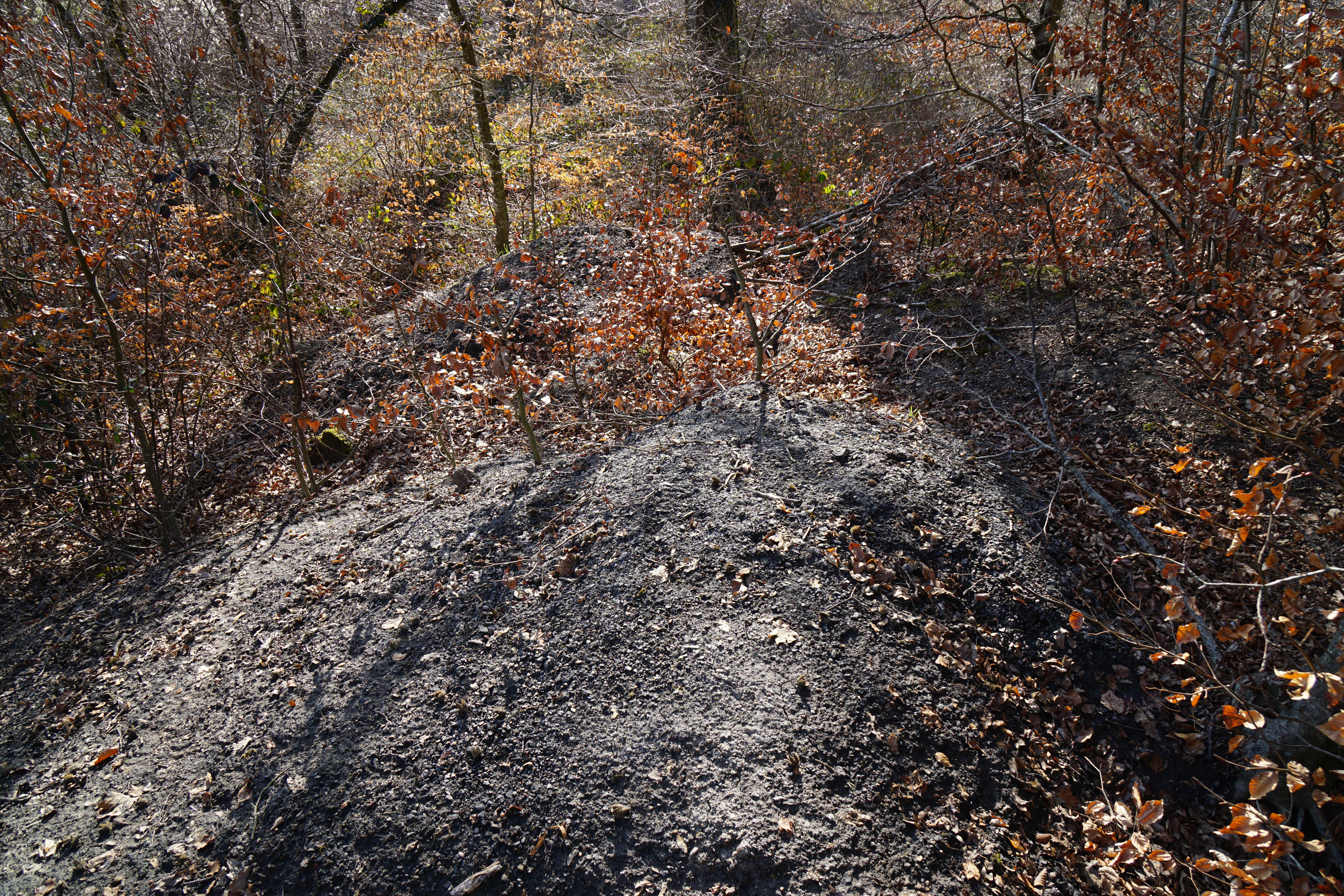
The rocks of the Buissons-Brûlé mine slag heap from the top.

== See also ==
- Mélecey
- Fallon, Haute-Saône
- Franche-Comté saltwater basin
- Haute-Saône Keuperian coal mining basin

== Bibliography ==
- Société d'agriculture, lettres, sciences et arts de la Haute-Saône (1831). Recueil agronomique, industriel et scientifique [Agronomic, industrial, and scientific compendium] (in French). Vol. 3–4. pp. 345–351.
- Thirria, Édouard (1869). Manuel à l'usage de l'habitant du département de la Haute-Saône [Manual for residents of the Haute-Saône department] (in French). pp. 182–186.
- Dormois, R; Ricours, J (1943). Houille triasique sur le versant N.O. du Jura [Triassic coal on the northwestern slope of the Jura Mountains] (PDF) (in French). BRGM.
- Benoit, Paul (1999). Le charbon de terre en Europe occidentale avant l'usage industriel du coke [Charcoal in Western Europe before the industrial use of coke] (in French). Turnhout: Brepols. ISBN 978-2-503-50891-7.
- Morin, Denis (2008). "La saline de Melecey-Fallon (Haute-Saône). Traditions et innovations techniques dans la fabrication du sel au XIXe siècle… Quand le bois remplace le charbon de terre" [The Melecey-Fallon saltworks (Haute-Saône). Traditions and technical innovations in salt production in the 19th century... When wood replaced coal]. Sel, eau, forêt. D'hier à aujourd'hui [Salt, water, forest. From yesterday to today] (in French). Besançon: Presses universitaires de Franche-Comté. pp. 479–504. doi:10.4000/books.pufc.25777. ISBN 978-2-84867-230-4.
- Bregnard, Michel (2010). Les Vosges saônoises de A à Z [The Vosges Saônoises from A to Z] (in French). Saint-Cyr-sur-Loire: Éditions Alan Sutton. ISBN 978-2-8138-0168-5.
