= Franche-Comté saltwater basin =

Geological salt deposit in Franche-Comté, France, formed during the Late Triassic

Rock salt and coal Rock salt only Saline springs

The Franche-Comté salt basin is a geological formation that developed during the Late Triassic on the northwestern flank of the Jura Mountains. It stretches diagonally across the Franche-Comté region, from southeastern Haute-Saône to the central Jura department.

The salt deposits are primarily located in the Jura and Doubs departments, with exploitation dating from Antiquity to the 21st century. In Haute-Saône, extraction occurred from the 12th to the 20th centuries, where the salt basin coexists with the Keuper coal basin of Haute-Saône, which provided coal for evaporating brine, reducing production costs for mining companies. Since the 19th century, this activity has been linked to the chemical industry.

== Formation of the salt deposits ==
Formation of the salt and coal deposits.

Approximately 215 million years ago during the Late Triassic, the Panthalassa ocean, covering eastern France (then part of the supercontinent Pangaea), receded, leaving a shallow lagoon of seawater brine. Through evaporation, this formed a substantial layer of over 100 meters of evaporite deposits, including halite (rock salt). Over time, these were buried under more than 200 meters of marl and limestone through sedimentation. The Jura Mountains formed around 35 million years ago during the Priabonian due to compression and folding from the Alps pushing westward. The evaporite layer rose closer to the surface in some areas due to folding and erosion. Groundwater infiltrated the deposits, dissolved salt, and reemerged as springs.

The main historical industrial salt deposits in the Jura lie between Besançon and the Bresse plain, along the foothills of the Jura Mountains. Key sites include Lons-le-Saunier (Latin: Ledo Salinarius, meaning "salt city") and Salins-les-Bains (named after the Muire spring), as well as deposits in Montmorot, Tourmont, Grozon, Poligny, and Miserey-Salines. The basin extends into Haute-Saône and beyond Franche-Comté into Lorraine, Champagne-Ardenne, Germany, Poland, the Bresse plain, and the Alps.

The basin is divided into two stratigraphic parts. The first consists of three salt layers totaling over 250 meters thick, separated from the second by a thin layer of reed-bearing sandstone. The second part includes gypsum-bearing marls, anhydrite, red marls, dolomite, iridescent marls, and a fragmented coal deposit. The sequence is capped by Rhaetian sandstones and shales, approximately 15 meters thick.

== Exploitation ==
=== Prehistory to the Middle Ages ===
Evidence of salt extraction from the Neolithic period has been found at Grozon and Gouhenans, dated between 4821 and 4534 BCE. Extraction at Grozon began around 3900–3540 BCE. As the region became more populated, exploitation intensified by the 13th century BCE.

In September 2014, rescue archaeology at Grozon uncovered remnants of a High Middle Ages saltworks (7th century), including wooden and stone building foundations.

=== Modern times, then nationalization during the Revolution ===
Before the French Revolution, saltworks in Franche-Comté included Montmorot and Salins-les-Bains in the Jura, Arc-et-Senans in the Doubs, and Saulnot in Haute-Saône. These were nationalized, becoming a state monopoly under the Eastern Saltworks and Mines Company, which managed all rock salt in Franche-Comté and Lorraine. This system faced opposition from local residents and liberal politicians. In 1831, two entrepreneurs illegally operated the Gouhenans saltworks.

=== Liberalization in the 19th Century ===
The salt market was liberalized in Franche-Comté and Lorraine by the law of June 17, 1840, allowing private companies to operate under mining administration oversight. In 1843, the saltworks of Montmorot, Salins-les-Bains, and Arc-et-Senans were auctioned. Three concessions were granted in Haute-Saône: Gouhenans (legalized), Mélecey-Fallon (operational from 1850), and Époisses (granted in 1848 but unexploited). A concession for Grozon in the Jura was granted in 1845.

Legal disputes arose among entrepreneurs due to the competitive salt market. The Gouhenans saltworks were implicated in the Teste-Cubières scandal, a corruption case tried by the Court of Peers in July 1847. A proposed merger of Montmorot, Salins-les-Bains, and Arc-et-Senans into a joint-stock company by Jean-Marie de Grimaldi with Spanish capital was rejected by the Council of State in 1847 and 1855 to prevent market monopolization. In 1862, the Société anonyme des anciennes salines domaniales de l'Est was established, forming a cartel known as the "Nancy syndicate." New concessions in the Doubs and Jura followed, including Miserey (1868), Châtillon-le-Duc (1875), Pouilley-les-Vignes (1889), Perrigny (1892), Poligny (1894), and Serre-les-Sapins (1898, unexploited). These were absorbed by the cartel in 1877. Initially, concessions encouraged competition, but overproduction and closures of Mélecey, Grozon, Arc-et-Senans, and Montferrand led to cartel consolidation. Two concessions were denied on July 31, 1907, to stabilize the market.

=== Decline in the 20th Century ===
Salt production in Franche-Comté continued until 1962.

== See also ==
- Saltworks – Salt mine
- Geology of the Jura Mountains
- Salt mining
- Evaporite
- Triassic
- Chemical industry
- History of salt
- Royal Saltworks at Arc-et-Senans
- Coal mines and saltworks of Mélecey

== Bibliography ==
- Bichet, Vincent; Campy, Michel (2009). Montagnes du Jura: Géologie et paysages [Mountains of the Jura: Geology and Landscapes] (in French) (2 ed.). Besançon: Néo Éditions. ISBN 978-2-914741-61-3.
- Sommaruga, Anna (2000). Géologie du Jura central et du bassin molassique: nouveaux aspects d'une chaîne d'avant-pays plissée et décollée sur des couches d'évaporites [Geology of the Central Jura and the Molasse Basin: New Insights into an Evaporite-Based Foreland Fold and Thrust Belt] (in French). Neuchâtel: Société neuchâteloise des Sciences naturelles. ISBN 2-88347-001-4.
- Dormois, R.; Ricours, J. (1943). Houille triasique sur le versant N.O. du Jura [Triassic Coal on the Northwestern Slope of the Jura] (PDF). BRGM.
- Morin, Denis (2008). "La saline de Melecey-Fallon (Haute-Saône). Traditions et innovations techniques dans la fabrication du sel au XIXe siècle… Quand le bois remplace le charbon de terre" [The Mélecey-Fallon Saltworks (Haute-Saône): Traditions and Technical Innovations in 19th-Century Salt Production… When Wood Replaces Coal]. In Weller, Olivier; Dufraisse, Alexa; Petrequin, Pierre (eds.). Sel, eau, forêt. D'hier à aujourd'hui [Salt, Water, Forest: From Yesterday to Today]. Besançon: Presses universitaires de Franche-Comté. pp. 479–504. doi:10.4000/books.pufc.25777. ISBN 978-2-84867-230-4.
- Clerget, Yves (2015). Il était une fois... des salines en Franche-Comté [Once Upon a Time... Saltworks in Franche-Comté] (PDF). Muséum Cuvier Montbéliard and Action culturel du Rectorat. Archived from the original (PDF) on 7 October 2015.
- Boully, Vincent (2013). Entre liberté d'entreprendre et surveillance par l'État: Les salines de Franche-Comté dans la seconde moitié du XIXe siècle (1840-1907) [Between Entrepreneurial Freedom and State Oversight: The Saltworks of Franche-Comté in the Second Half of the 19th Century (1840–1907)]. sorbonne.fr.
