= Fallon, Haute-Saône =

Fallon
- Commune
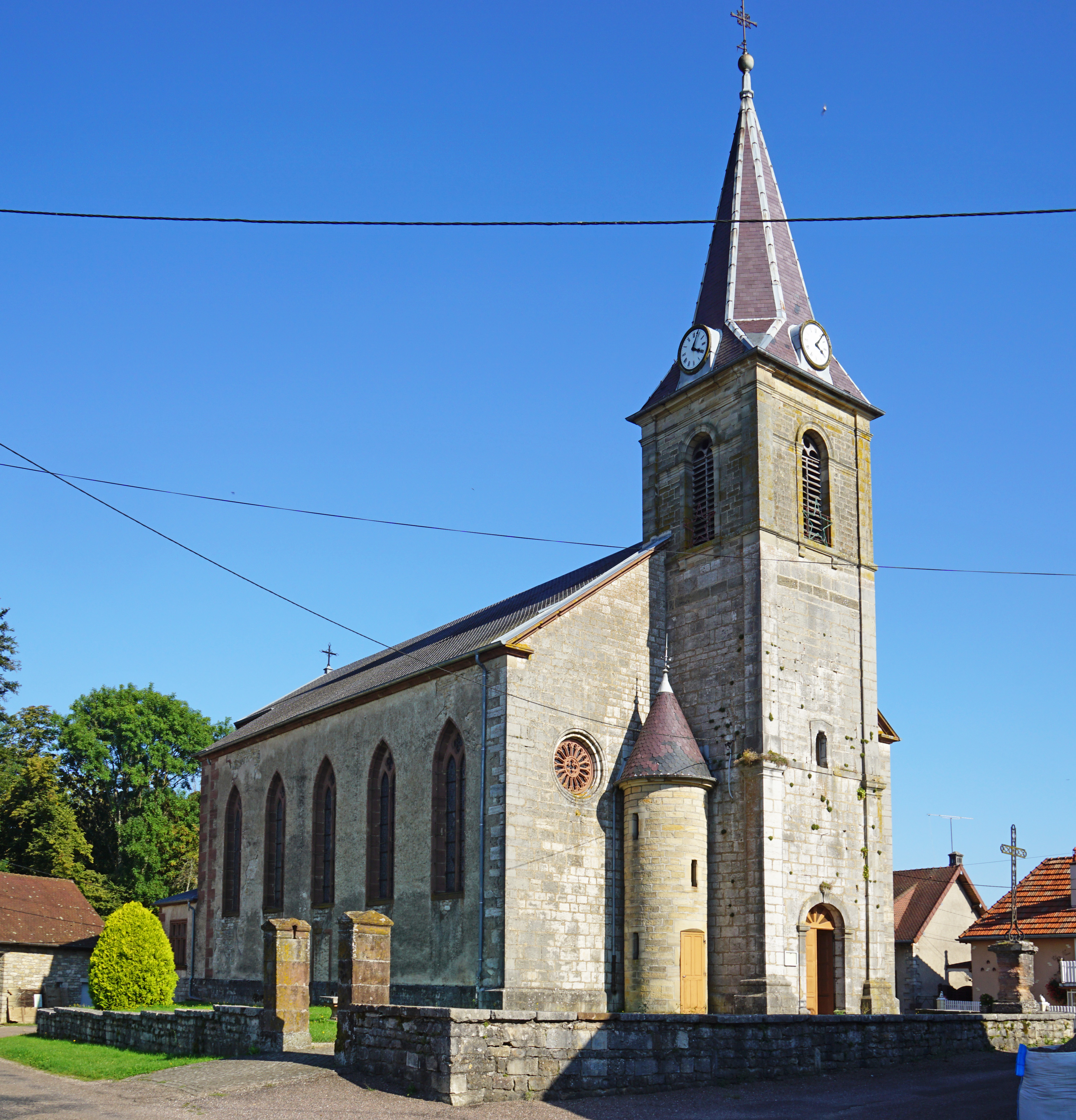
- The church in Fallon

- Coat of arms
- Location of Fallon
- Location within France Location within Bourgogne-Franche-Comté
- Coordinates: 47°30′27″N 6°28′55″E
- Country: France
- Region: Bourgogne-Franche-Comté
- Department: Haute-Saône
- Arrondissement: Lure
- Canton: Villersexel

Government
  - Mayor (2020–2026): Jean-Paul Blandin
- Area^{1}: 5.64 km^{2} (2.18 sq mi)
- Highest elevation: 434 m (1,424 ft)
- Lowest elevation: 294 m (965 ft)
- Population (2023): 306
  - Density: 54.3/km^{2} (141/sq mi)
- Time zone: UTC+01:00 (CET)
  - Summer (DST): UTC+02:00 (CEST)
- INSEE/Postal code: 70226 /70110
- ^{1} French Land Register data, which excludes lakes, ponds, glaciers > 1 km^{2} (0.386 sq mi or 247 acres) and river estuaries.

Fallon (French pronunciation: [falɔ̃]) is a commune in the Haute-Saône department in the region of Bourgogne-Franche-Comté in eastern France.

== See also ==
- Communes of the Haute-Saône department
- Coal mines and saltworks of Mélecey
