= Cold stamping =

Application Diagram for Cold-foil Stamping: 1. First substrate; 2. Application of glue; 3. Cold-foil stamping; 4. UV radiation; 5. Worn-cold stamping foil; 6. Print refined foil

Cold stamping, also known as press working, is a manufacturing operation in which thermoplastics in sheet form are cold-formed using methods similar to those used in metalworking. A precut thermoplastic sheet, possibly reinforced, is softened by heating to a temperature particular to the plastic in use. The heated sheet is then shaped by stamping using a press. Fiberglass-reinforced thermoplastic sheets are formed using metal stamping presses after the sheets are preheated to about 200 °C (392 °F).
