= Abbenans =

- Commune
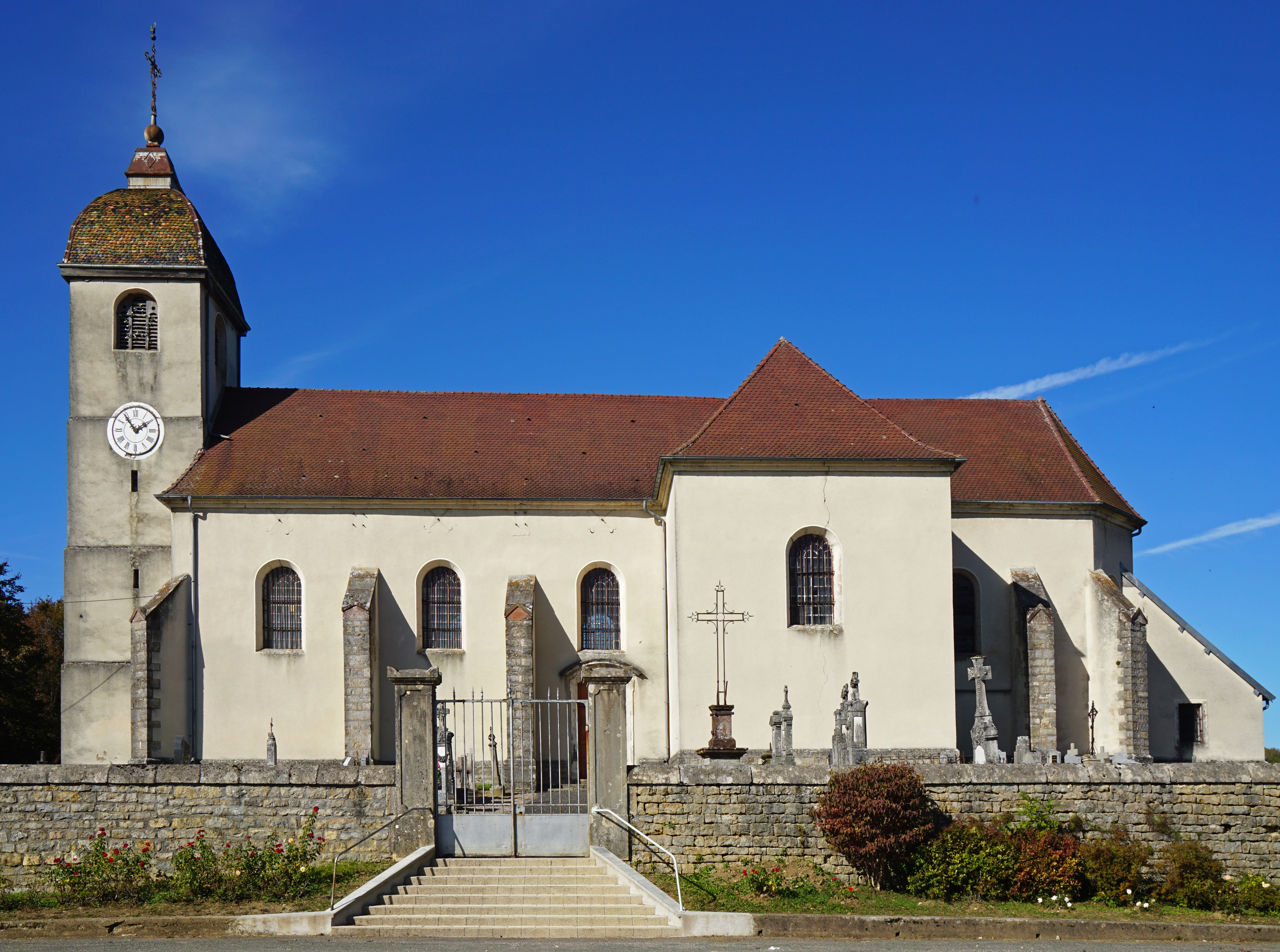
- The church in Abbenans
- Location of Abbenans
- Location within France Location within Bourgogne-Franche-Comté
- Coordinates: 47°30′03″N 6°27′05″E
- Country: France
- Region: Bourgogne-Franche-Comté
- Department: Doubs
- Arrondissement: Besançon
- Canton: Baume-les-Dames
- Intercommunality: Deux Vallées Vertes

Government
  - Mayor (2024–2026): Rodney Hedin
- Area^{1}: 11.17 km^{2} (4.31 sq mi)
- Highest elevation: 447 m (1,467 ft)
- Lowest elevation: 270 m (890 ft)
- Population (2023): 321
  - Density: 28.7/km^{2} (74.4/sq mi)
- Demonym(s): Abbenanais, Abbenanaises
- Time zone: UTC+01:00 (CET)
  - Summer (DST): UTC+02:00 (CEST)
- INSEE/Postal code: 25003 /25340
- ^{1} French Land Register data, which excludes lakes, ponds, glaciers > 1 km^{2} (0.386 sq mi or 247 acres) and river estuaries.

Abbenans (French pronunciation: [abnɑ̃]) is a commune in the Doubs department in the Bourgogne-Franche-Comté region in eastern France.

== Population ==
Historical population

Year	Pop.	±% p.a.
1793	699	—
1800	670	−0.60%
1806	817	+3.36%
1821	821	+0.03%
1831	943	+1.40%
1836	1,005	+1.28%
1841	1,063	+1.13%
1846	1,014	−0.94%
1851	957	−1.15%
1856	824	−2.95%
1861	866	+1.00%
1866	866	+0.00%
1872	709	−3.28%
1876	690	−0.68%
1881	675	−0.44%
1886	591	−2.62%
1891	545	−1.61%
1896	513	−1.20%
1901	457	−2.29%

Year	Pop.	±% p.a.
1906	439	−0.80%
1911	386	−2.54%
1921	356	−0.81%
1926	317	−2.29%
1931	302	−0.96%
1936	269	−2.29%
1946	266	−0.11%
1954	296	+1.34%
1962	331	+1.41%
1968	324	−0.36%
1975	377	+2.19%
1982	403	+0.96%
1990	353	−1.64%
1999	370	+0.52%
2007	353	−0.59%
2012	352	−0.06%
2017	342	−0.57%
2023	321	−1.05%

Source: EHESS and INSEE

== See also ==
- Communes of the Doubs department
