= Mélecey =

- Commune
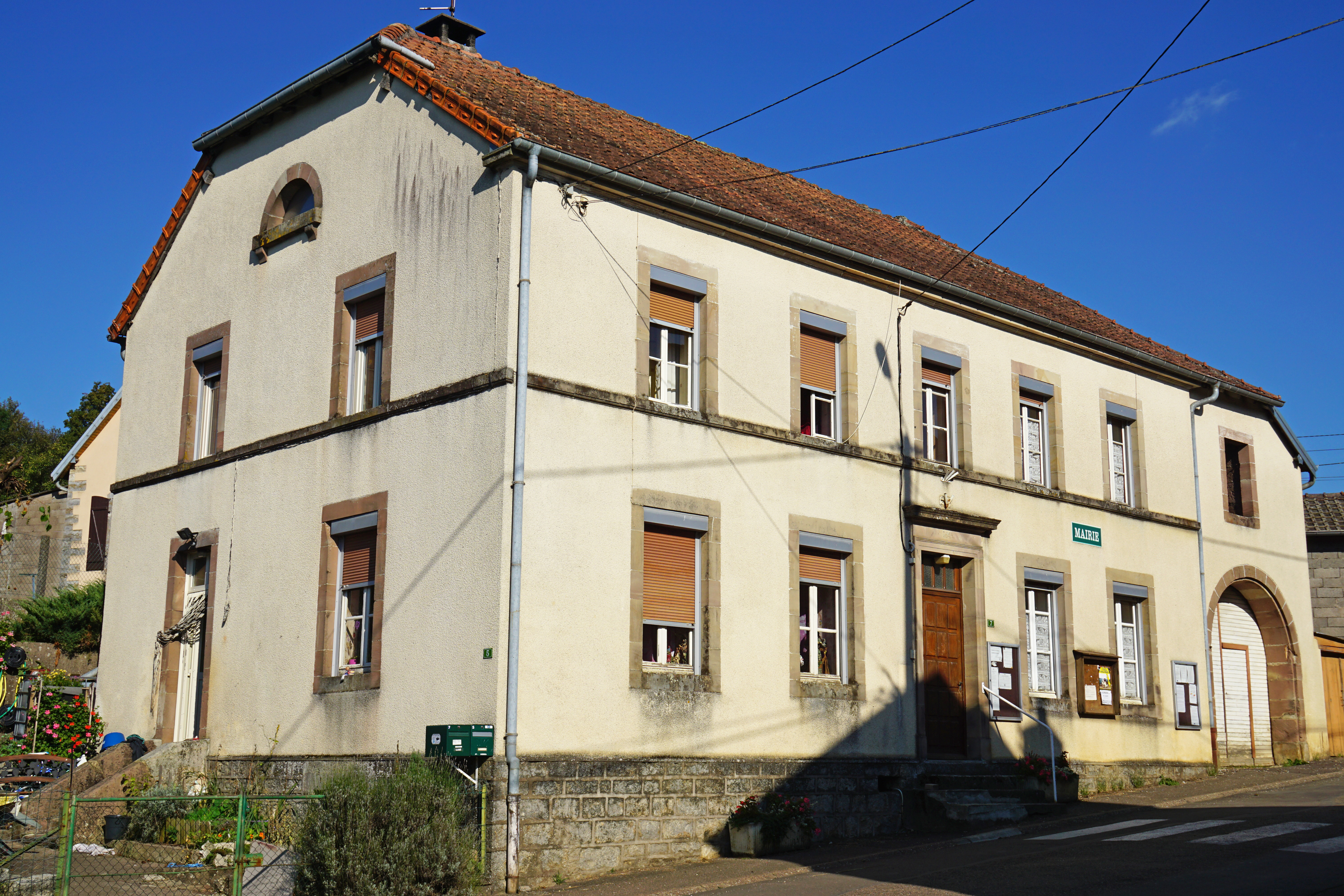
- The town hall in Mélecey
- Location of Mélecey
- Location within France Location within Bourgogne-Franche-Comté
- Coordinates: 47°31′12″N 6°29′28″E
- Country: France
- Region: Bourgogne-Franche-Comté
- Department: Haute-Saône
- Arrondissement: Lure
- Canton: Villersexel
- Area^{1}: 3.35 km^{2} (1.29 sq mi)
- Highest elevation: 375 m (1,230 ft)
- Lowest elevation: 283 m (928 ft)
- Population (2023): 137
  - Density: 40.9/km^{2} (106/sq mi)
- Time zone: UTC+01:00 (CET)
  - Summer (DST): UTC+02:00 (CEST)
- INSEE/Postal code: 70336 /70110
- ^{1} French Land Register data, which excludes lakes, ponds, glaciers > 1 km^{2} (0.386 sq mi or 247 acres) and river estuaries.

Mélecey is a small commune in the Haute-Saône department in the region of Bourgogne-Franche-Comté in eastern France.

Coal mines are operated in the village.

== See also ==
- Communes of the Haute-Saône department
- Coal mines and saltworks of Mélecey
