= Aimé =

- Pronunciation: French: [ɛ.me]
- Gender: Male
- Language: French

Other gender
- Feminine: Aimée

Origin
- Meaning: "beloved"
- Region of origin: France

Other names
- Variant forms: Amé, Aimè, Aimer
- Related names: Amado (Spanish), Amato (Italian), Amatus (Latin)

Aimé (French: [ɛ.me]) is a French masculine given name and a surname. The feminine form is Aimée, translated as "beloved".

Aimé may refer to:

== Given name ==
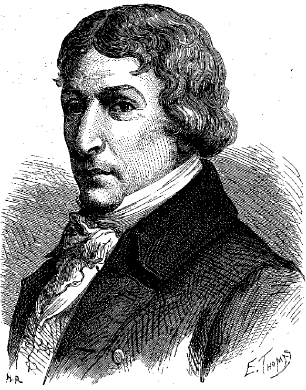
Aimé Argand

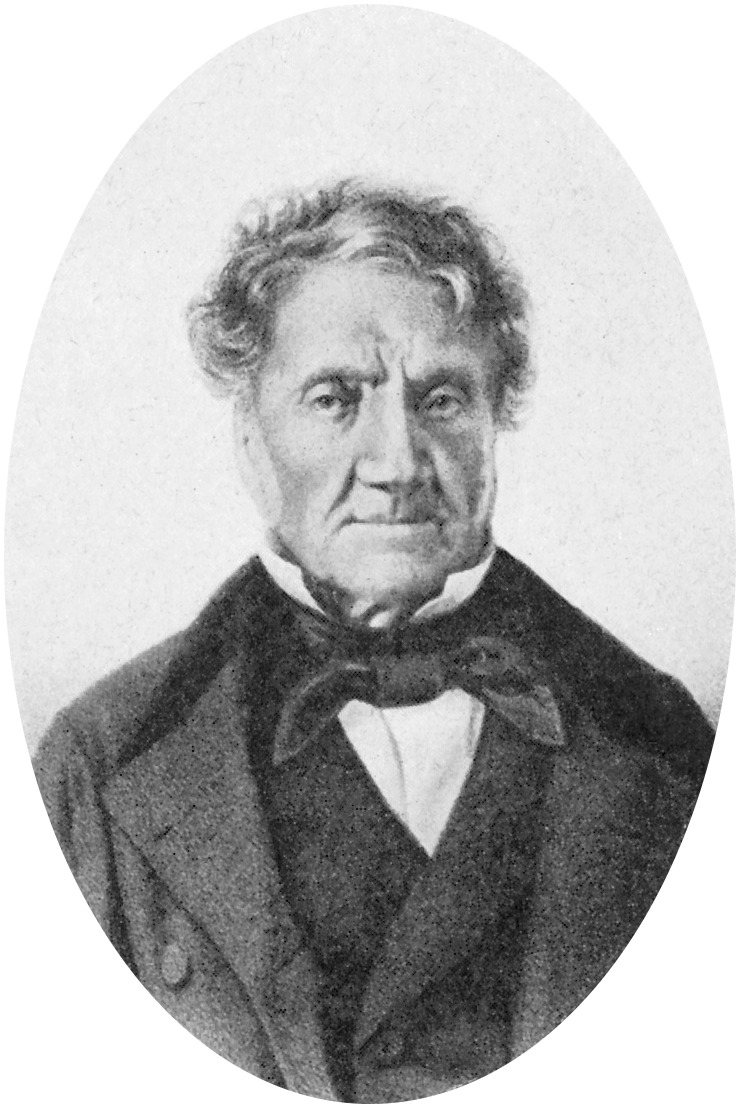
Aimé Bonpland

- Saint Amatus or Saint Aimé (died 690), Benedictine monk, saint, abbot and bishop in Switzerland
- Aimé, duc de Clermont-Tonnerre (1779–1865), French general, Minister of the Navy and the Colonies and Minister of War
- Aimé Adam (1913–2009), Canadian politician
- Aimé Anthuenis (born 1943), Belgian former football coach and player
- Aimé Barelli (1917–1995), French jazz trumpeter, vocalist and bandleader
- Aimé Barraud (1902–1954), Swiss painter
- Aimé Bazin (1904–1984), French art director
- Aimé Majorique Beauparlant (1864–1911), Canadian politician
- Aimé Bénard (1873–1938), Canadian politician
- Aimé Bergeal (1912–1973), French politician
- Aimé Boji, Congolese politician, member of the National Assembly since 2006
- Aimé Bonpland (1773–1858), French explorer and botanist
- Aimé Boucher (1877–1946), Canadian politician
- Aimé Brun (1887–1969), French philatelist
- Aimé Picquet du Boisguy (1776–1839), French Royalist general during the French Revolution
- Aimé Cassayet-Armagnac (1893–1927), French rugby union player
- Aimé Césaire (1913–2008), French poet, author and politician
- Aimé Clariond (1894–1959), French stage and film actor
- Aimé Cotton (1869–1951), French physicist
- Aimé De Gendt (born 1994), Belgian racing cyclist
- Aimé Deolet (1906–1986), Belgian racing cyclist
- Aimé Desprez (1783–1824), French vaudeville playwright and chansonnier
- Aimé Dossche (1902–1985), Belgian racing cyclist
- Aimé Dupont (1842–1900), Belgian-born American sculptor and photographer
- Aimé Duval or Père Duval, (1918–1984), French Jesuit priest, singer-songwriter and guitarist
- Aime Forand (1895–1972), American politician
- Aimé Fritz (1884–1950), American cyclist
- Aimé Thomé de Gamond (1807–1876), French engineer who devoted his life to championing a tunnel between France and England
- Amédée (Aimé) Gibaud (1885–1957), French chess master
- Aimé Girard (1831–1898), French chemist, agronomist and professor
- Aimé Gruet-Masson (1940–2014), French biathlete
- Aimé Guertin (1898–1970), Canadian business owner and politician
- Aimé Haegeman (1861–1935), Belgian equestrian
- Aimé Halbeher (1936–2021), French political activist and syndicalist
- Aimé Humbert (1819–1900), Swiss politician
- Aimé Charles Irvoy (1824–1898), French sculptor
- Aimé Jacquet (born 1941), French retired football coach and player
- Aime Kitenge (born 1975), Burundian retired football goalkeeper
- Aimé Koudou (born 1976), Ivorian former footballer
- Aimé Langlois (1880–1954), Canadian politician
- Aimé Leborne (1797–1866), Belgium-born French composer and music educator
- Aimé Laussedat (1819–1907), French scientist
- Aimé Lavie (born 1984), French footballer
- Aimé Lepercq (1889–1944), French soldier, member of the Resistance, industrialist and politician
- Aimé Mabika (born 1998), Zambian footballer
- Aimé Maeght (1906–1981), French art dealer, collector, lithographer and publisher
- Aimé Maillart (1817–1871), French composer best known for his operas
- Aimé Martin (1781–1844), French writer
- Aimé Leon Meyvis (1877–1932), Flemish landscape painter
- Aimé Michel (1919–1992), French ufologist
- Aimé Mignot (1932–2022), French former football manager and player
- Aimé Millet (1819–1891), French sculptor
- Aimé Morot (1850–1913), French painter and sculptor
- Aimé Ngoy Mukena (fl. 2000–present), Congolese politician, Minister of Petroleum and Gas since 2015 and former Minister of Defence and Veterans' Affairs (2014–2015)
- Aimé Nzohabonayo (born 1989), Burundian footballer
- Aimé Olivier de Sanderval (1840–1919), French explorer, entrepreneur and author
- Aimé Paris (1798–1866), French scholar and developer of a method of stenography
- Aimé Pelletier (1914–2010), Canadian surgeon and novelist under the pen name Bertrand Vac
- Aimé Perpillou (1902–1976), French geographer
- Aimé Proot (1890–1959), Belgian long-distance runner
- Aimé Rakotondrajaona, Malagasy politician
- Aimé Reynaud (1808–1876), French naval officer
- Aimé Rosso (born 1955), French former footballer
- Aimé Simard (1968–2003), Canadian contract killer
- Aimé Simon-Girard (1889–1950), French film actor
- Aimé Terme (born 1945), French former weightlifter
- Aimé Teisseire (1914–2008), French officer who served in World War II and Indochina, a Grand Officier of the Légion d'Honneur
- Aimé Trantoul (1908–1986), French cyclist
- Aimé Félix Tschiffely (1895–1954), Swiss-born Argentine professor, writer and adventurer
- Aimé Venel (born 1950), French painter
- Aimé Vingtrinier (1812–1903), French printer, writer and amateur historian
- Aimé Emmanuel Yoka (fl. 1980–present), Congolese politician

== Surname ==
- Boman Aimé (born 1989), Ivorian footballer
- Léon Aimé (1924–2021), French politician
- Valcour Aime (1798–1867), American sugar planter, philanthropist and pioneer in the large-scale refining of sugar

== See also ==
- Aime, an Estonian feminine given name
- Bien-Aimé (disambiguation), which includes a list of people with the surname
- Aimé Leon Dore, fashion and lifestyle brand
