= Aimée =

Aimee
- Gender: Female
- Language: French

Origin
- Meaning: beloved

Aimée, often unaccented as Aimee, is a feminine given name of French origin, translated as "beloved". The masculine form is Aimé. The English equivalent is Amy. It is also occasionally a surname. It may refer to:

== Given name Aimée ==
- Aimée Bologne-Lemaire (1904–1998), Belgian feminist, member of the resistance and Walloon activist
- Aimée Antoinette Camus (1879–1965), French author
- Aimée Castle (born 1978), Canadian actress
- Aimée Croysdill (born 1989), English fashion stylist
- Aimée Dalmores (1890–1920), Italian-born American actress
- Aimée Delamain (1906–1999), English actress
- Aimée du Buc de Rivéry (1776–1817), French heiress, a cousin of Empress Josephine
- Aimée Duvivier (1766–?), French painter
- Aimée de Heeren (1903–2006), Brazilian socialite
- Aimée de Jongh (born 1988), Dutch cartoonist
- Aimée Lallement (1898–1988), French activist
- Aimée R. Kreimer (born 1975), American cancer epidemiologist
- Aimée Zebeyoux (born 1959), Ivorian judge and human rights activist
- Princess Aimée of Orange-Nassau, van Vollenhoven-Söhngen (born 1977), a princess of the Netherlands by marriage
- Aimée Leduc, a fictional character in crime novels by Cara Black

== Given name Aimee ==
- Aimee Banks (born 2002), Irish soprano
- Aimee Bender (born 1969), American novelist and short story writer
- Aimee Betro (born 1979), American woman convicted of attempting to carry out a contract killing in the UK
- Aimee Buchanan (born 1993), American-born Olympic figure skater for Israel
- Aimee Carrero (born 1988), Dominican—American actress
- Aimee Carter (born 1986), American writer
- Aimee Carty, Irish singer-songwriter
- Aimee Challenor (born 1997), British politician and transgender activist
- Aimee Chan (born 1981), Canadian born actress based in Hong Kong
- Aimee Anne Duffy (born 1984), Welsh singer-songwriter known professionally as Duffy
- Aimee Echo (born 1970), American vocalist
- Aimee Garcia (born 1978), American actress
- Aimee Johnson, American mathematician
- Aimee La Joie, American actress
- Aimee Mann (born 1960), American rock guitarist, bassist, and singer-songwriter
- Aimee Mullins (born 1976), American amputee athlete
- Aimee Nezhukumatathil (born 1974), Asian-American poet
- Aimee Osbourne (born 1983), English actress and singer, daughter of Ozzy and Sharon Osbourne
- Aimee Phan (born 1977), American author
- Aimee Richardson (born 1997), Northern Irish actress
- Aimee Semple McPherson (1890–1944), Canadian evangelist and founder of the Foursquare Church
- Aimee Sutorius (born 1979), New Zealand rugby union and sevens player
- Aimee Teegarden (born 1989), American actress
- Aimee Willard (1974–1996), American lacrosse player who was murdered
- Aimee Lou Wood (born 1994), English actress

== Surname ==
- Anouk Aimée (1932–2024), stage name of French film actress Françoise Florence Dreyfus
- Cyrille Aimée (born 1984), French jazz singer
- Patrick Aimée (born 1976), Mauritian footballer

== See also ==
- Aimée & Jaguar, a 1999 German drama film set during World War II
- Aurore and Aimée, a French literary fairy tale written by Jeanne-Marie Le Prince de Beaumont
- Amie (disambiguation)
