= AIME =

AIME, Aime, or Aimé may refer to:

== People ==
- Aime (Estonian name), a feminine Estonian given name
- Aimé, a masculine French given name and given name

== Organizations ==
- American Institute of Mining, Metallurgical, and Petroleum Engineers
- Australian Indigenous Mentoring Experience, of which Jeff McMullen was a director

== Other uses ==
- Aime, France, a former commune
- American Invitational Mathematics Examination, a mathematics contest
- Average Indexed Monthly Earnings, used in the US Social Security system
- Aime, an online service by Sega

== See also ==
- AIM (disambiguation)
