= Bien-Aimé =

Bien-Aimé may refer to:

== Ships ==
- French ship Bien-Aimé, several ships of the French Navy
- Bien-Aimé class ship of the line - see French ship Victoire (1770)

== People with the surname ==
- Gabriel Bien-Aimé (died 2010), former Minister of National Education of Haiti
- Paul Antoine Bien-Aimé, former Minister of Interior and Territorial Collectivities of Haiti
- Sonia Bien-Aime (born 1971), president of the Turks and Caicos Islands Football Association
- Taina Bien-Aimé (fl. 1992-present), Swiss activist and lawyer

== See also ==
- Bienaimé (disambiguation)
- Bien Aimée (disambiguation)
