= Duvivier =

Duvivier (or du Vivier) is a French surname. Notable people with the surname include:

- Aimée Duvivier (1766–?), French painter
- Edgar Duvivier (born 1955), Brazilian sculptor and musician
- François du Pont Duvivier (1676–1714), French navy captain who served in Acadia
- François Dupont Duvivier (1705–1776), Acadian-born merchant and officer of the French colonial troupes de la marine
- George Duvivier (1920–1985), American jazz double-bass player
- Gregorio Duvivier (born 1986), Brazilian actor, comedian and poet, son of Edgar
- Jean Duvivier (1687–1761), French medallist
- Jean-Bernard Duvivier (1762–1837), painter and drawer of historical and religious subjects and portraits
- Julien Duvivier (1896–1967), French film director
- Marthe Duvivier (1850–?), French opera singer
- Paul Duvivier (1869–1956), French journalist
- Pierre-Simon-Benjamin Duvivier (1730–1819), French engraver of coins and medals
