= Croasdale =

Croasdale is a surname of English origin. It is a habitational name, named after an unidentified place, possibly Crowsdale Wood in North Yorkshire or Croasdale in Cumbria. The earliest record of the name occurs is of Johannes de Crosdale in 1379. Possible variations of the surname include: Croasdell, Croisdale, Crossdale, Croasdaile, Crosdill, Croisdall, Crosdil, Crosedale, Crowsdale, Croysdill, Crossdil, Crousdale, Croasdoll, Croosdale, Croysdale, Crosdale, Crossdell, and Crosdall.

Notable people with the surname include:

- Mark Croasdale (born 1965), English athlete
- Ryan Croasdale (born 1994), English footballer

Croisdale

- Lindsay Croisdale-Appleby (born 1973), British diplomat

Crossdale

- Ali Crossdale (born 1998), English footballer
- Martell Taylor-Crossdale (born 1999), English footballer

Crosdill

- John Crosdill (1751–1825), English musician

Croysdill

- Aimée Croysdill (born 1989), fashion stylist
