= Cara Black (author) =

American writer

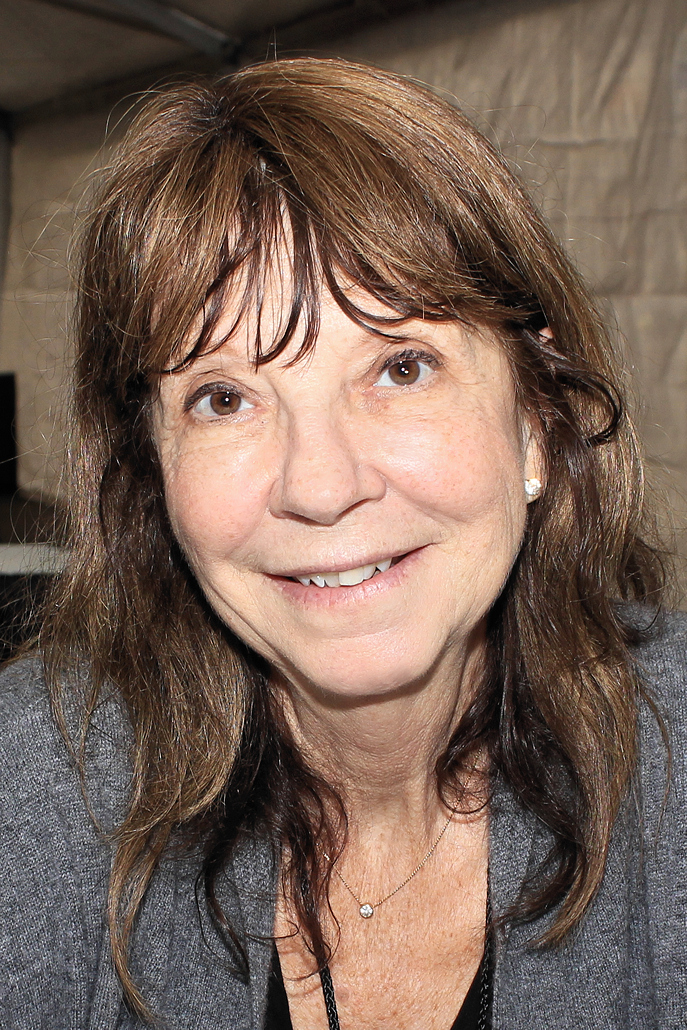
- Black at the 2016 Texas Book Festival
- Born: November 14, 1951 (age 74); Chicago, Illinois, USA
- Occupation: Novelist
- Writing career
- Genre: Crime
- Notable work: Aimée Leduc mystery novels
- Website: carablack.com

Cara Black (born November 14, 1951) is an American mystery writer. She is best known for the twenty-one novel mystery series featuring Aimée Leduc a female Paris-based private investigator, as well as the thrillers Three Hours in Paris, a national bestseller, and Night Flight to Paris. Black is included in the Great Women Mystery Writers by Elizabeth Lindsay 2nd edition. Her first novel Murder in the Marais was nominated for an Anthony Award for best first novel and the third novel in the series, Murder in the Sentier, was Anthony-nominated for Best Novel. Her books have been translated into German, Norwegian, Japanese, French, Spanish, Italian, and Hebrew.

== Biography ==
Black was born in Chicago, Illinois on November 14, 1951. She was educated at Cañada College in California, Sophia University in Yotsuya, Tokyo in Japan, and finished her schooling at San Francisco State University where she earned bachelor's and master's degrees in education.

She has worked as a preschool teacher and as director of a preschool. Black lives in San Francisco with her husband, Jun Ishimuro, a bookseller. They have a son.

== Awards ==
Awards for Black's writing
Year	Title	Award	Result	Ref.
2000	Murder in the Marais	Anthony Award for Best First Novel	Finalist	
2000	Murder in the Marais	Macavity Award for Best First Novel	Finalist	
2003	Murder in the Sentier	Anthony Award for Best Novel	Finalist	
2014	Murder Below Montparnasse	Left Coast Crime Calamari Award	Finalist	

== Works ==
=== Aimée Leduc Series ===
- Murder in the Marais (1998), ISBN 1-56947-212-2.
- Murder in Belleville (2000), ISBN 1-56947-279-3.
- Murder in the Sentier (2002), ISBN 1-56947-331-5.
- Murder in the Bastille (2003), ISBN 1-56947-364-1.
- Murder in Clichy (2004), ISBN 1-56947-411-7.
- Murder in Montmartre (2005), ISBN 1-56947-445-1.
- Murder on the Ile Saint-Louis (2007), ISBN 1-56947-475-3.
- Murder in the Rue de Paradis (2008), ISBN 1-56947-542-3.
- Murder in the Latin Quarter (2009), ISBN 1-56947-541-5.
- Murder in the Palais Royal (2010), ISBN 978-1-56947-883-7.
- Murder in Passy (2011), ISBN 1-56947-882-1.
- Murder at the Lanterne Rouge (2011), ISBN 978-1-61695-061-3.
- Murder below Montparnasse (2013), ISBN 978-1-61695-215-0.
- Murder in Pigalle (2014), ISBN 978-1-48296-837-8.
- Murder on the Champ de Mars (2015), ISBN 978-1-61695-286-0.
- Murder on the Quai (2016), ISBN 978-1-61695-678-3.
- Murder in Saint-Germain (2017), ISBN 978-1-61695-770-4.
- Murder on the Left Bank (2018), ISBN 978-1-61695-927-2.
- Murder in Bel-Air (2019), ISBN 978-1-61695-930-2.
- Murder at the Porte de Versailles (2022), ISBN 978-1-64129-043-2.
- Murder at La Villette (2024), ISBN 978-1-64129-447-8.

=== Other Novels ===
- Three Hours in Paris (2020), ISBN 978-1-64129-041-8.
- Night Flight to Paris (2023), ISBN 978-1-64129-355-6.
