= Murder in the Marais =

1998 novel by Cara Black

- Author: Cara Black
- Series: Aimee Leduc
- Genre: Mystery
- Publisher: Soho Press
- Publication date: 1998
- ISBN: 1-56947-212-2
- Followed by: Murder in Belleville

Murder in the Marais is a 1998 mystery novel by American novelist Cara Black. It is the first installment in the series following French private investigator Aimee Leduc.

== Background ==
Murder in the Marais was partially inspired by the mother of Black's friend, who discovered that her parents had been taken to Auschwitz in 1943, when she came to her apartment and found them gone. When writing the novel, Black reportedly had no plans to write a series, but was encouraged to do so by her editor.

As part of her research for the novel, Black interviewed three female private investigators from Paris, including Madeleine Dieudonné.

== Publication ==
Murder in the Marais was first published in 1998 by Soho Press.

== Plot summary ==
Aimee Leduc, a private detective who specializes in computer forensics, is hired by Soli Hecht, an acquaintance of her late police officer father, to unencrypt a photograph taken during the German occupation during World War II. Hecht asks her to deliver the photograph to Lili Stein, a Jewish women who lives in The Marais neighborhood of Paris. When Leduc arrives at Stein's home, she finds that the woman has been murdered, and that a swastika has been carved into her forehead. Leduc begins an investigation that reveals secrets from both the past and the present.
