= De Buyer =

French cookware manufacturer

- Type: Private
- Industry: Consumer Goods
- Founded: 1830
- Founder: de Buyer family
- Headquarters: Le Val-d'Ajol, France
- Products: Cookware, bakeware, tabletop, accessories
- Website: www.debuyer-usa.com

de Buyer (/də buːˈjeɪ/ də boo-YAY) is a French cookware manufacturer, founded in 1830, from the village Le Val-d'Ajol in the Vosges department. de Buyer produces around 3,000 different products: cookware made of steel, stainless steel, copper and non stick aluminium, mandoline slicers, silicone moulds, pastry utensils, etc. On June 23, 2016, de Buyer acquired Marlux, a pepper, salt and spice mills manufacturer in France.

de Buyer products are mainly targeted at professional and serious gourmet consumers.

== History ==
Blason of de Buyer family.

A metallurgy manufactory was founded in 1830 at the locality of Faymont in the Val-d'Ajol commune, situated in the Vosges department in Lorraine, France. Initially, the company produced sheet metal and hand-crafted wrought iron utensils using iron ore extracted from the surrounding mountains. It gradually industrialized between 1850 and 1950 under the leadership of the de Buyer family, which acquired the production site in 1867.

In 1957, Hervé de Buyer joined the company as a demonstrator and later took over its management in 1988. Facing competition from mass retailing and emerging countries, he decided to reposition production towards the high-end market.

== See also ==
- Le Val-d'Ajol
- Arthur de Buyer Coal Mine (the name is based on the same family)
