= Bienaimé =

Bienaimé is a surname. Notable people with the surname include:

- Didier Bienaimé (1961–2004), French actor
- Émile Bienaimé (1802–1869), French composer
- Luigi Bienaimé (1795–1878), sculptor working in Italy
- Robert Bienaimé (1876–1960), French perfumer

== See also ==
- Bien-Aimé (disambiguation)
- Bien Aimée (disambiguation)
- Irénée-Jules Bienaymé (1796–1878), French statistician
