= Bien Aimée =

Bien Aimée or Bien-Aimée (French for "beloved") may refer to:

- La Bien-aimée, a 1967 French television drama
- Bien Aimée, a 1928 one-act ballet choreographed by Bronislava Nijinska
- "La Bien-aimée!", a 1904 song by Eugène Héros
- French frigate Dur (1671), a 24-gun frigate later renamed Bien Aimée - see List of sail frigates of France
- French frigate Dur (1673), a 28-gun frigate later renamed Bien Aimée - see List of sail frigates of France

== See also ==
- Bien-Aimé (disambiguation)
- Bienaimé (disambiguation)
