= Le Val-d'Ajol =

- Commune
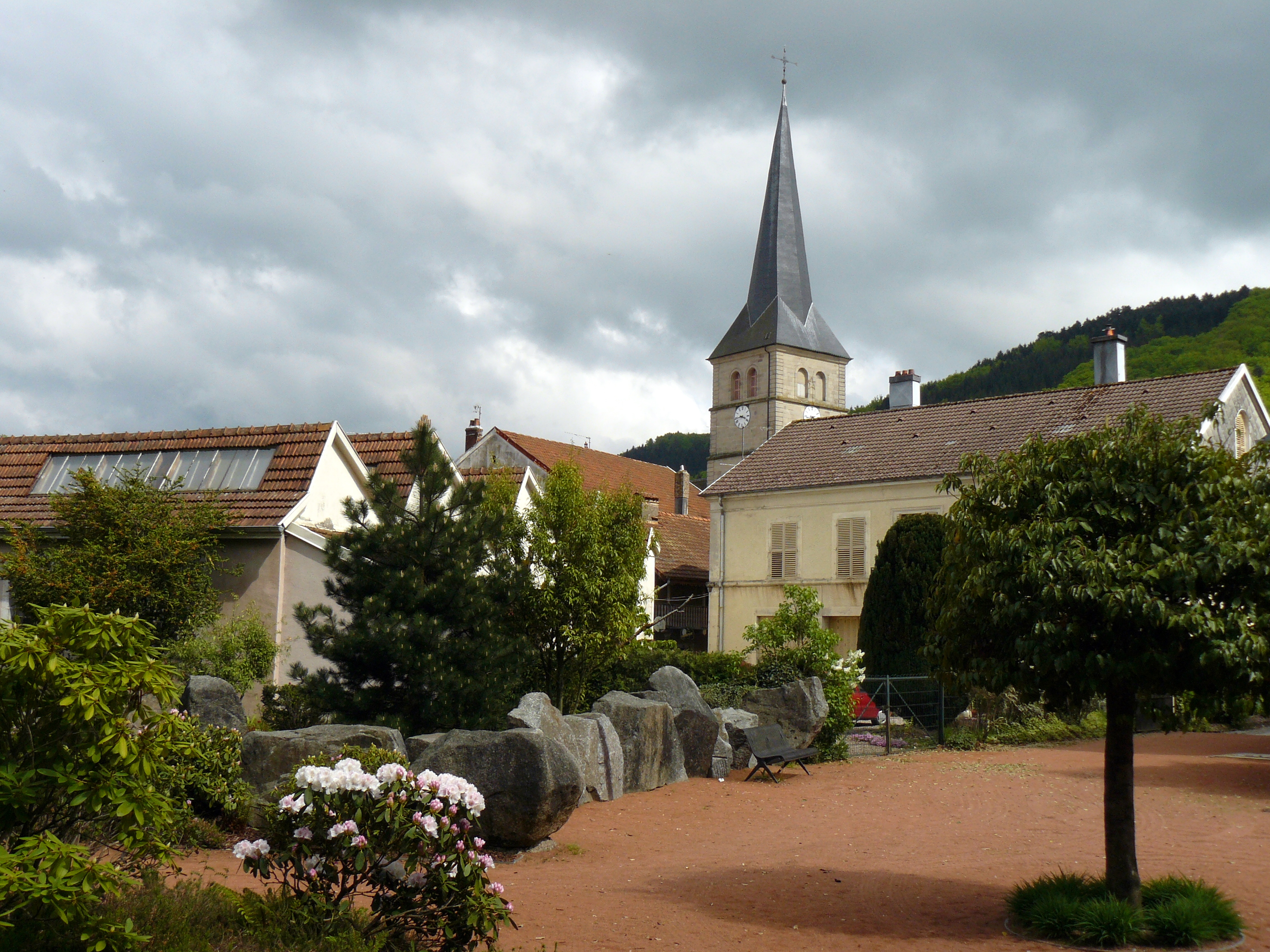
- The church and surroundings in Le Val-d'Ajol

- Coat of arms
- Location of Le Val-d'Ajol
- Location within France Location within Grand Est
- Coordinates: 47°55′33″N 6°29′01″E
- Country: France
- Region: Grand Est
- Department: Vosges
- Arrondissement: Épinal
- Canton: Le Val-d'Ajol
- Intercommunality: CC Porte des Vosges Méridionales

Government
  - Mayor (2023–2026): Thomas Vincent
- Area^{1}: 73.33 km^{2} (28.31 sq mi)
- Highest elevation: 761 m (2,497 ft)
- Lowest elevation: 328 m (1,076 ft)
- Population (2023): 3,885
  - Density: 52.98/km^{2} (137.2/sq mi)
- Time zone: UTC+01:00 (CET)
  - Summer (DST): UTC+02:00 (CEST)
- INSEE/Postal code: 88487 /88340
- ^{1} French Land Register data, which excludes lakes, ponds, glaciers > 1 km^{2} (0.386 sq mi or 247 acres) and river estuaries.

Le Val-d'Ajol (French pronunciation: [lə val daʒɔl]) is a commune in the Vosges department in Grand Est in northeastern France. The Jesuit priest and singer Aimé Duval (1918–1984) was born in Le Val-d'Ajol.

== Population ==
Historical population
Year	Pop.	±% p.a.
1968	5,802	—
1975	5,573	−0.57%
1982	5,229	−0.91%
1990	4,877	−0.87%
1999	4,452	−1.01%
2007	4,138	−0.91%
2012	3,967	−0.84%
2017	3,871	−0.49%
2023	3,885	+0.06%
Source: INSEE

== See also ==
- Communes of the Vosges department
- De Buyer
