= Arthur de Buyer Coal Mine =

Mine in France

Coal mine Arthur de Buyer
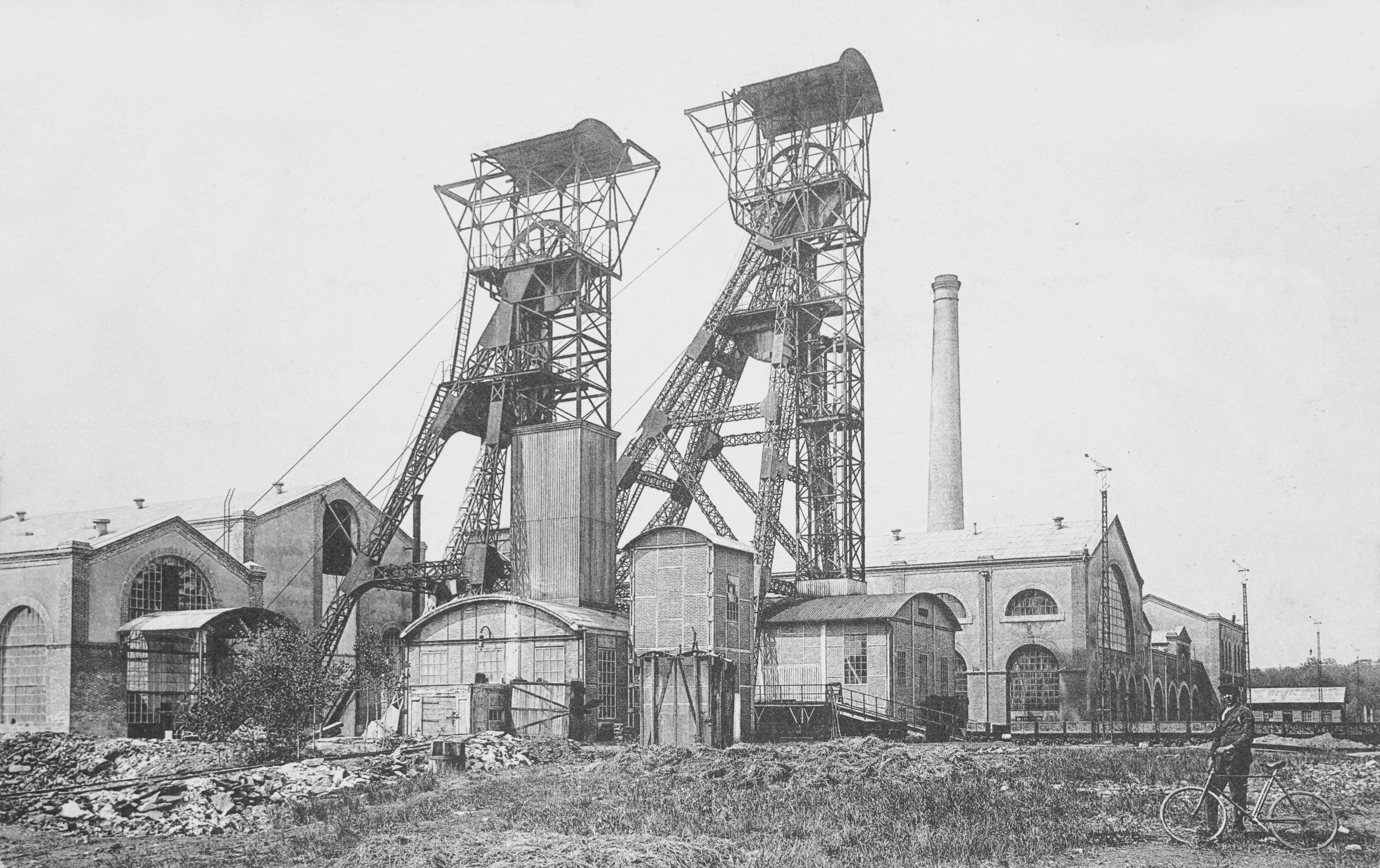
- The coal mine Arthur de Buyer in activity

- Location within France

Location
- Location: Magny-Danigon; 47.677008°N 6.614247°E

History
- Opened: 1900
- Closed: 1954

Owner
- Company: Ronchamp coal mines

The Arthur de Buyer Coal Mine, or coal mine #11, was one of the major Ronchamp coal mines, which is in the area of the commune of Magny-Danigon in the French region of Franche-Comté. Digging started in 1894 in an attempt to ensure the future of the company, which was in a difficult position at that time. The project was directed by Leon Poussigue, director of the company since 1891. He was responsible for organizing the excavation, designing buildings and installing each machine. The seat is named as a tribute to Arthur de Buyer (the same family of the De Buyer owner), the president since 1876. He retired during the commissioning activity of the mine.

Active from 1900 to the early 1950s, it was 1010 meters deep, making it the deepest mine in France in the early 20th century and the first to pass the symbolic depth of 1,000 meters.

After it had produced coal for almost half a century, there were, up to the 21st century, several conversion attempts. Today only ruins remain. A project to install a solar photovoltaic power plant in the municipality has been under study since June 2012.

== Pictures ==
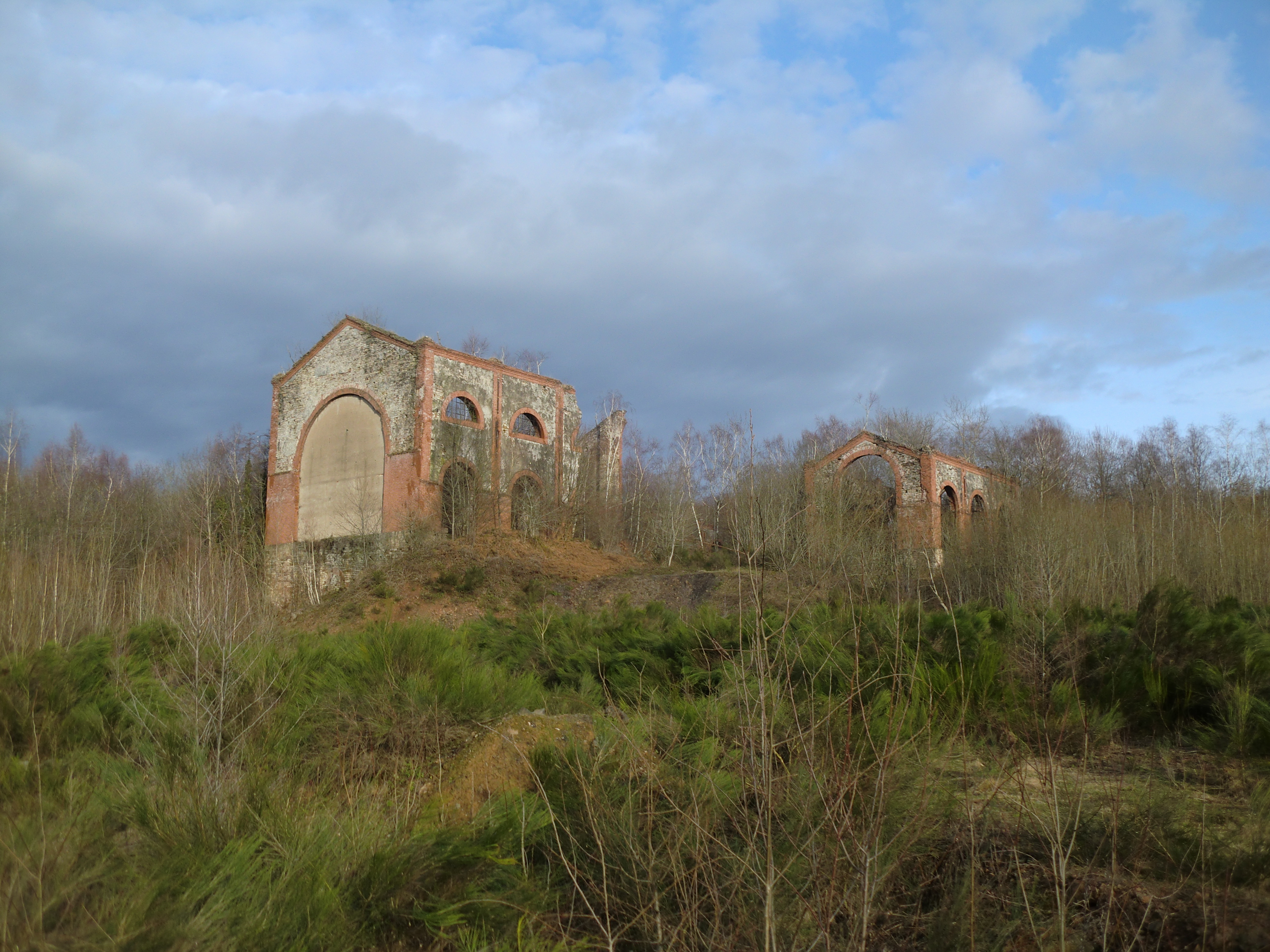
The ruins.

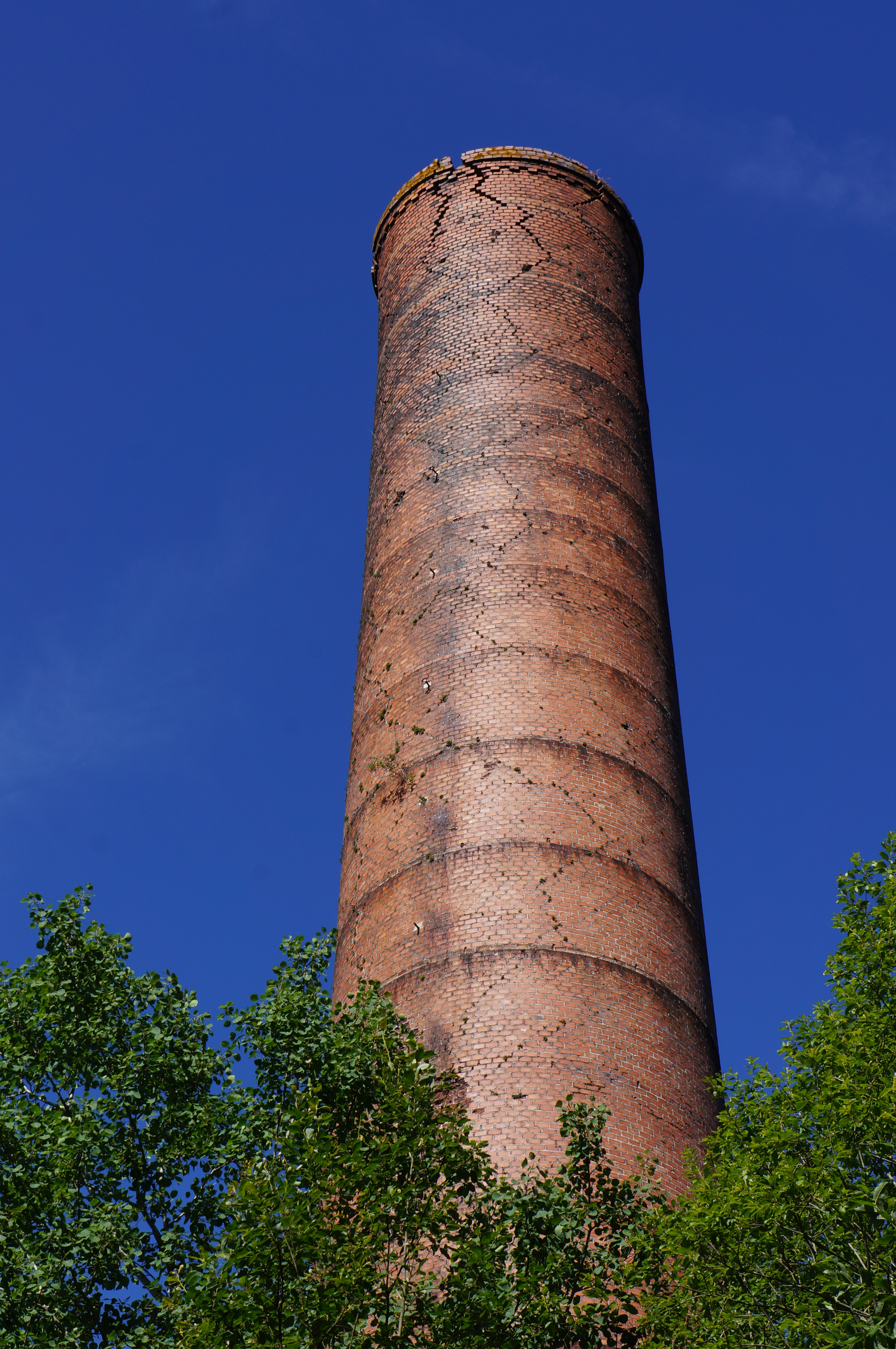
The chimney.

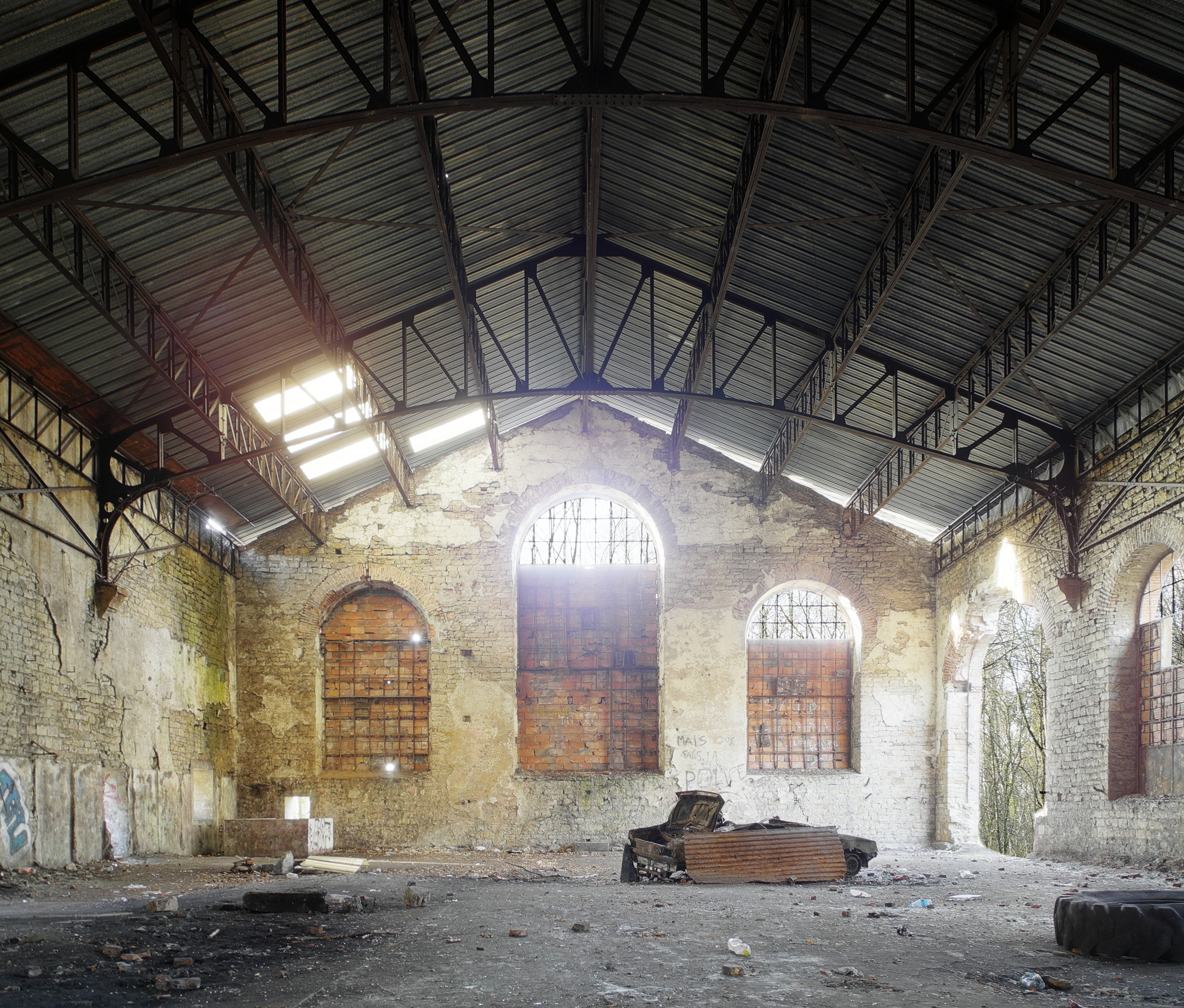
The locker room.

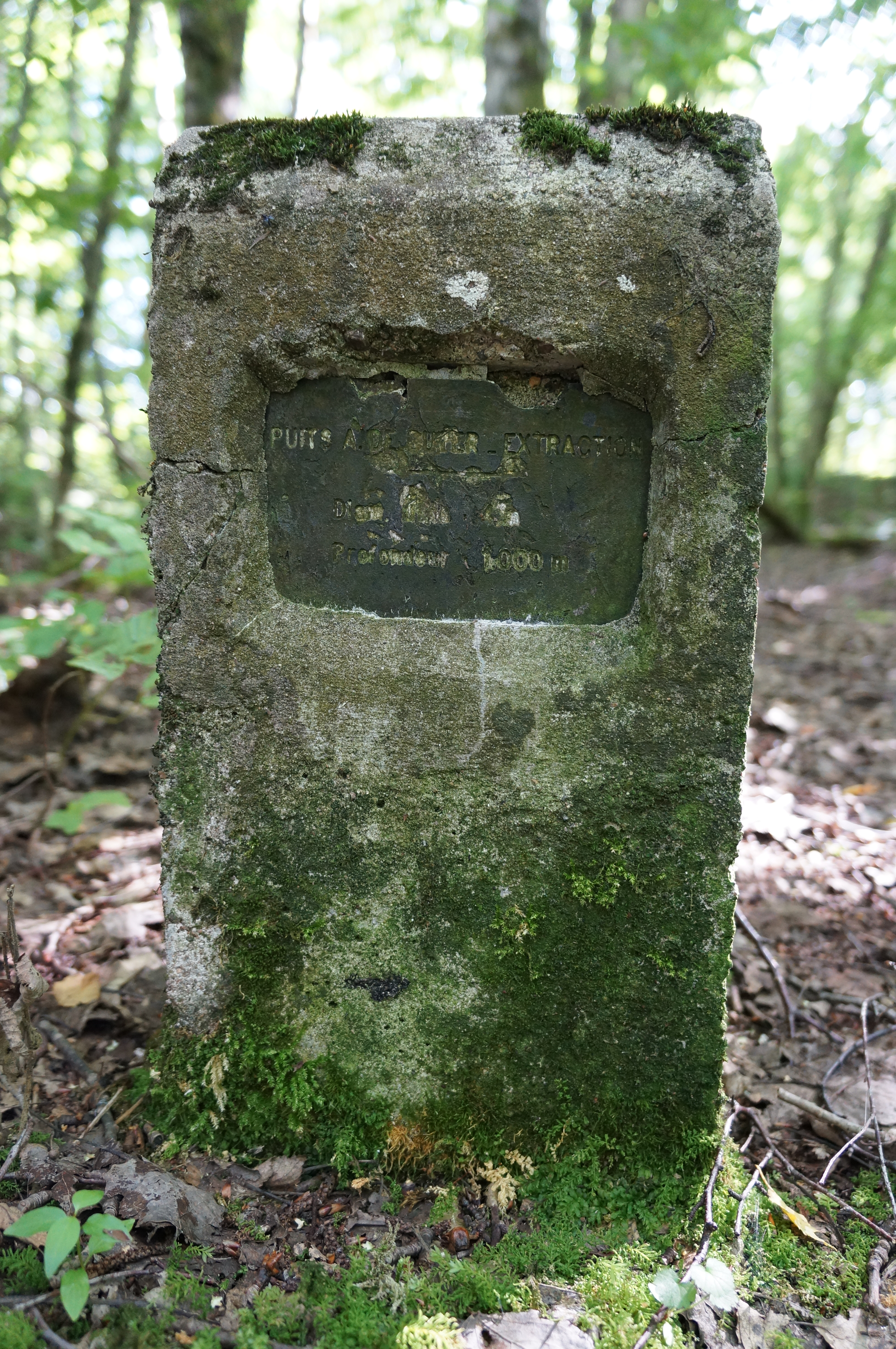
Indication of Pit A.

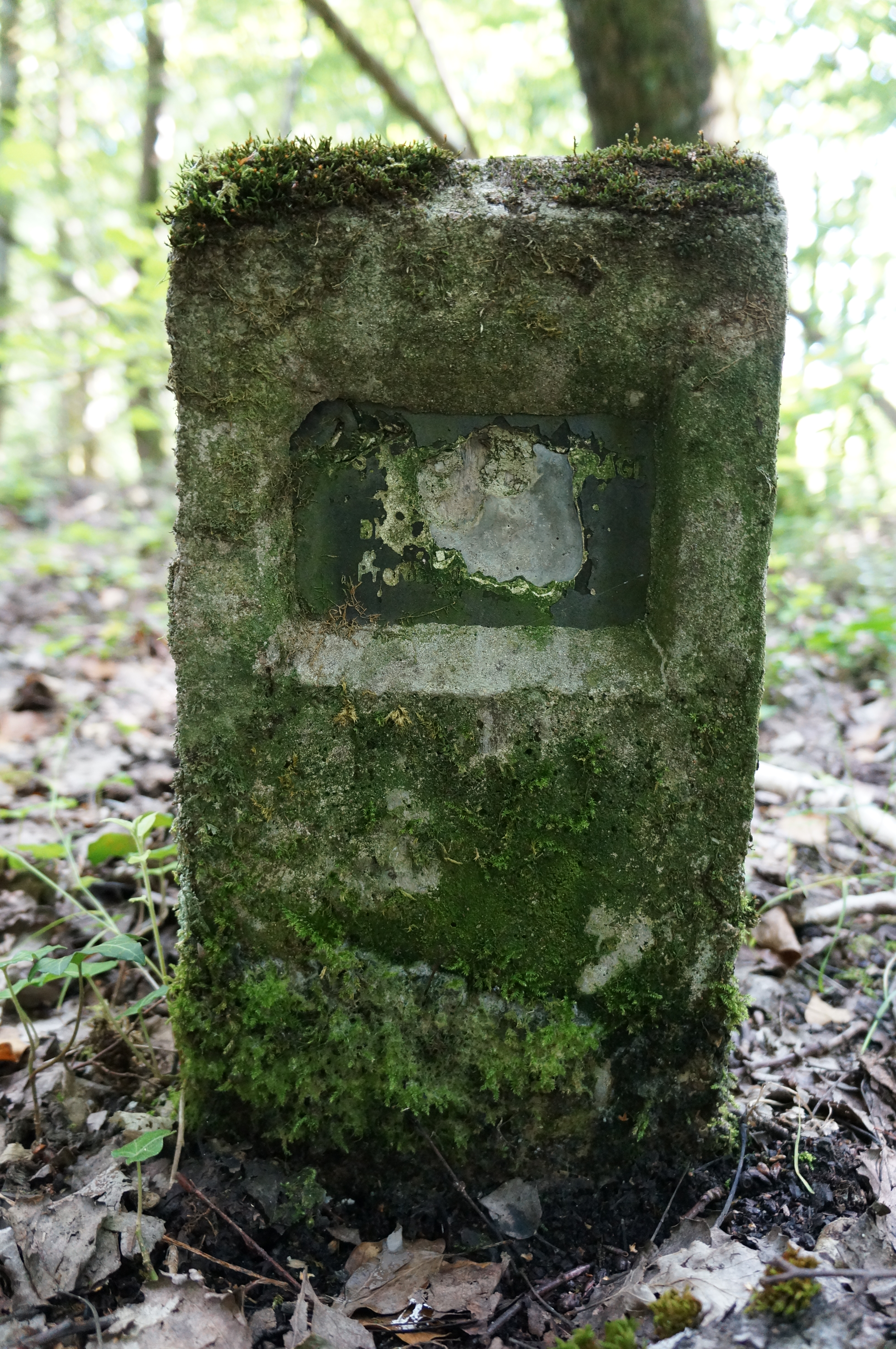
Indication of Pit B.

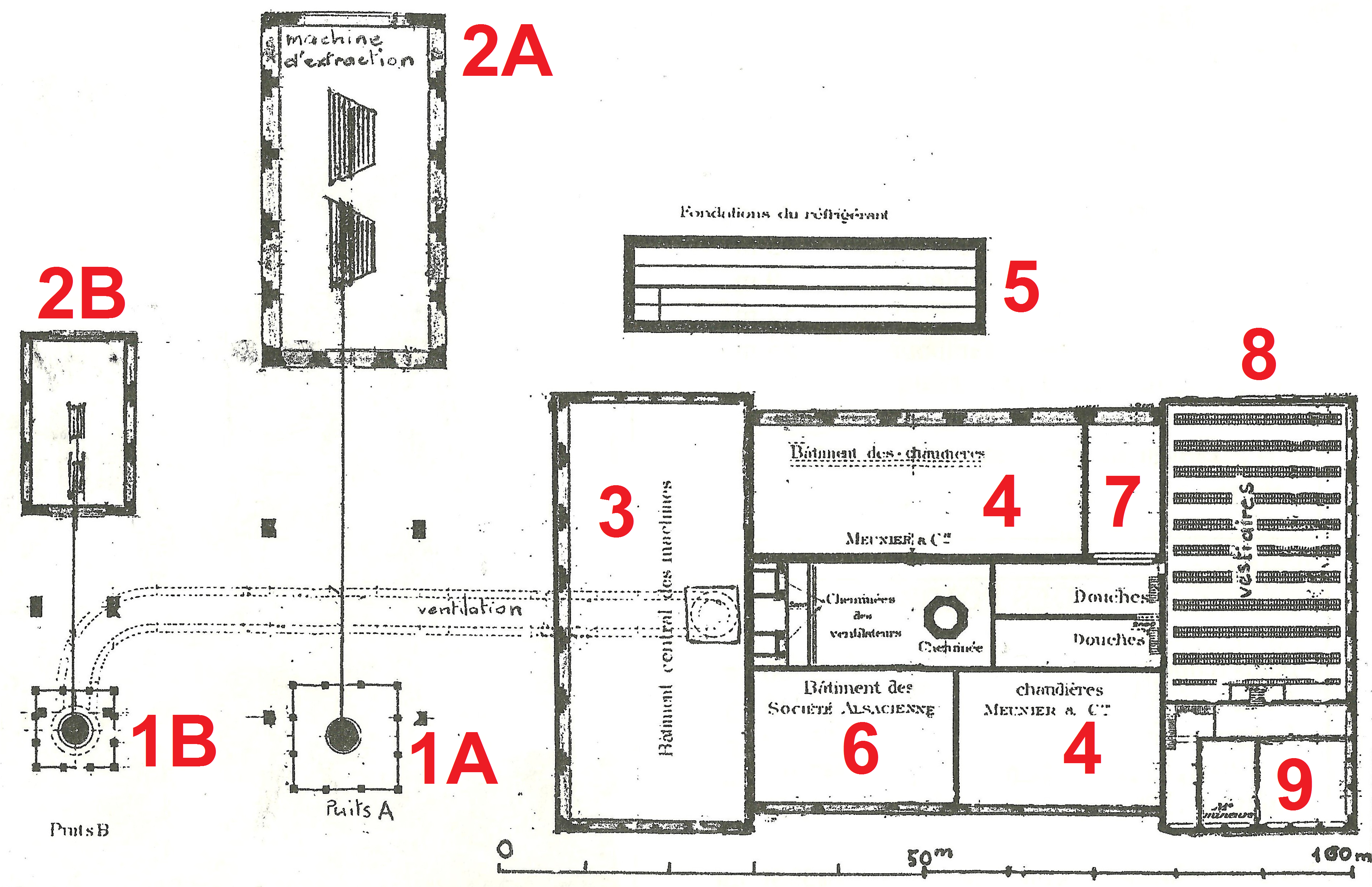
Organization of buildings : 1A. Shaft mining A (extraction); 1B. Shaft mining B (relief); 2A. Winding engine A; 2B. Winding engine B; 3. underground mine ventilation mechanical fan, Air compressor, Electric generator; 4. Boiler; 5. Cooling tower; 6. Alsatian companies room; 7. schower; 8. cloakroom; 9. offices and lampisteria.

Doubled headframe and electric winding engine

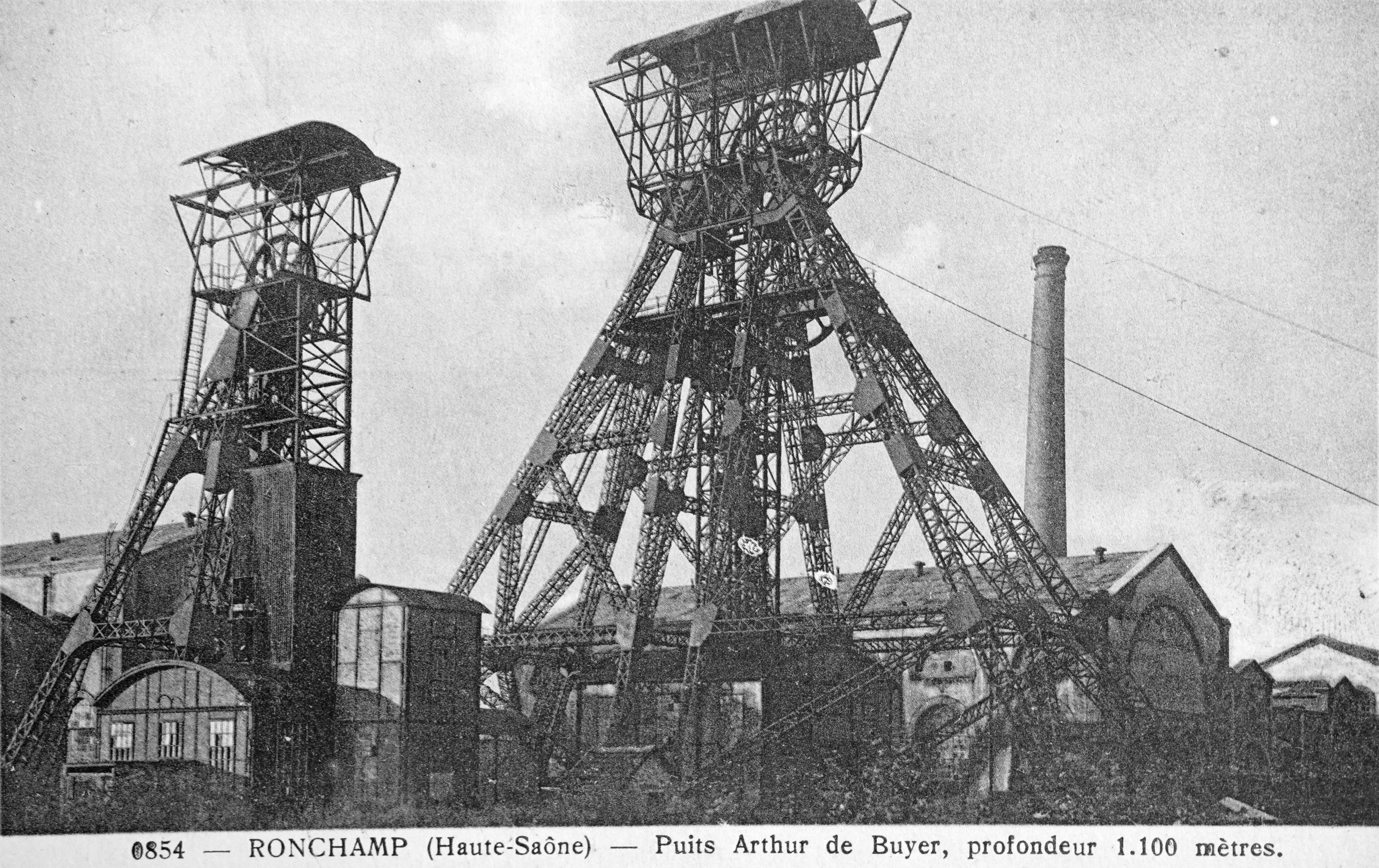

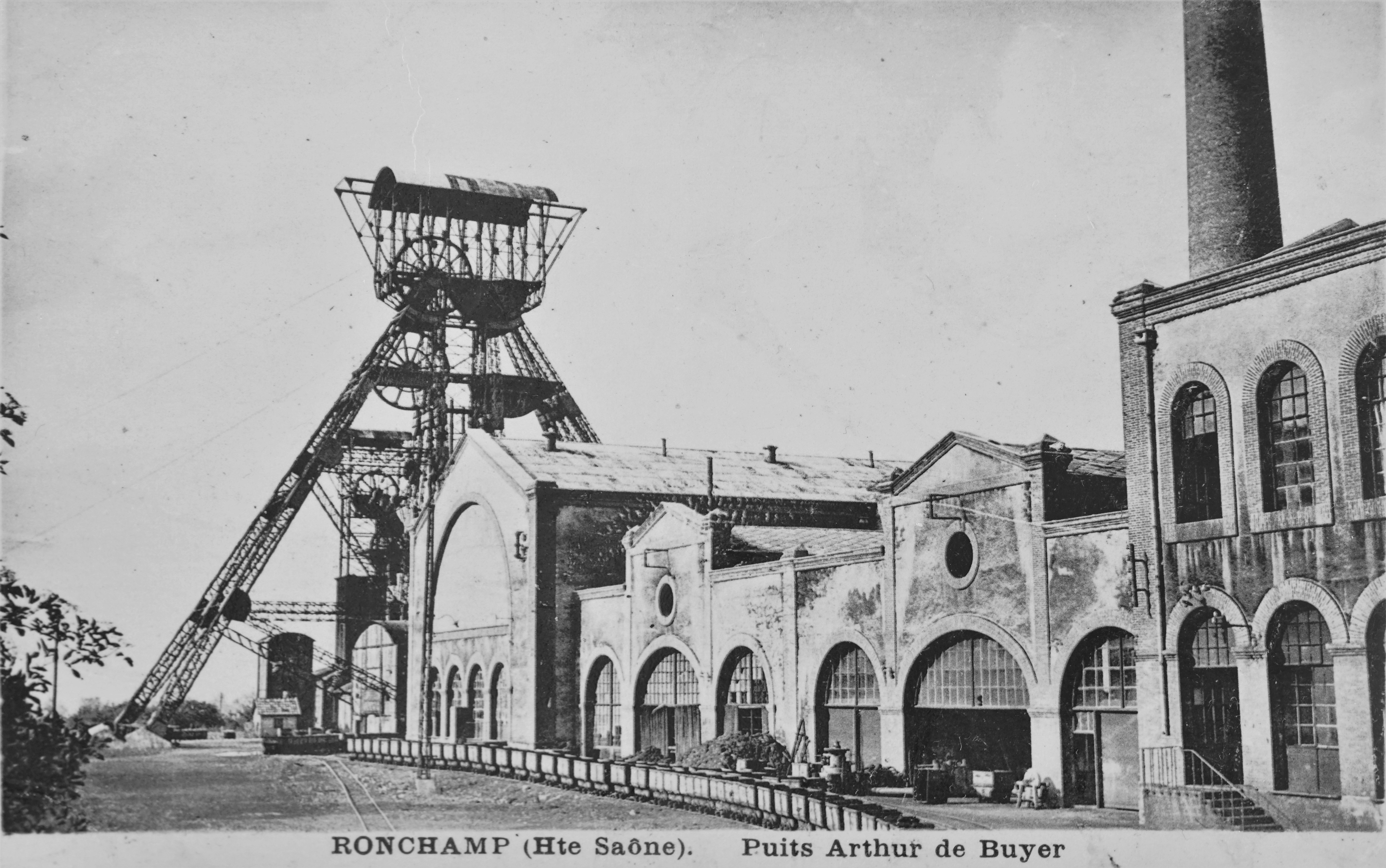

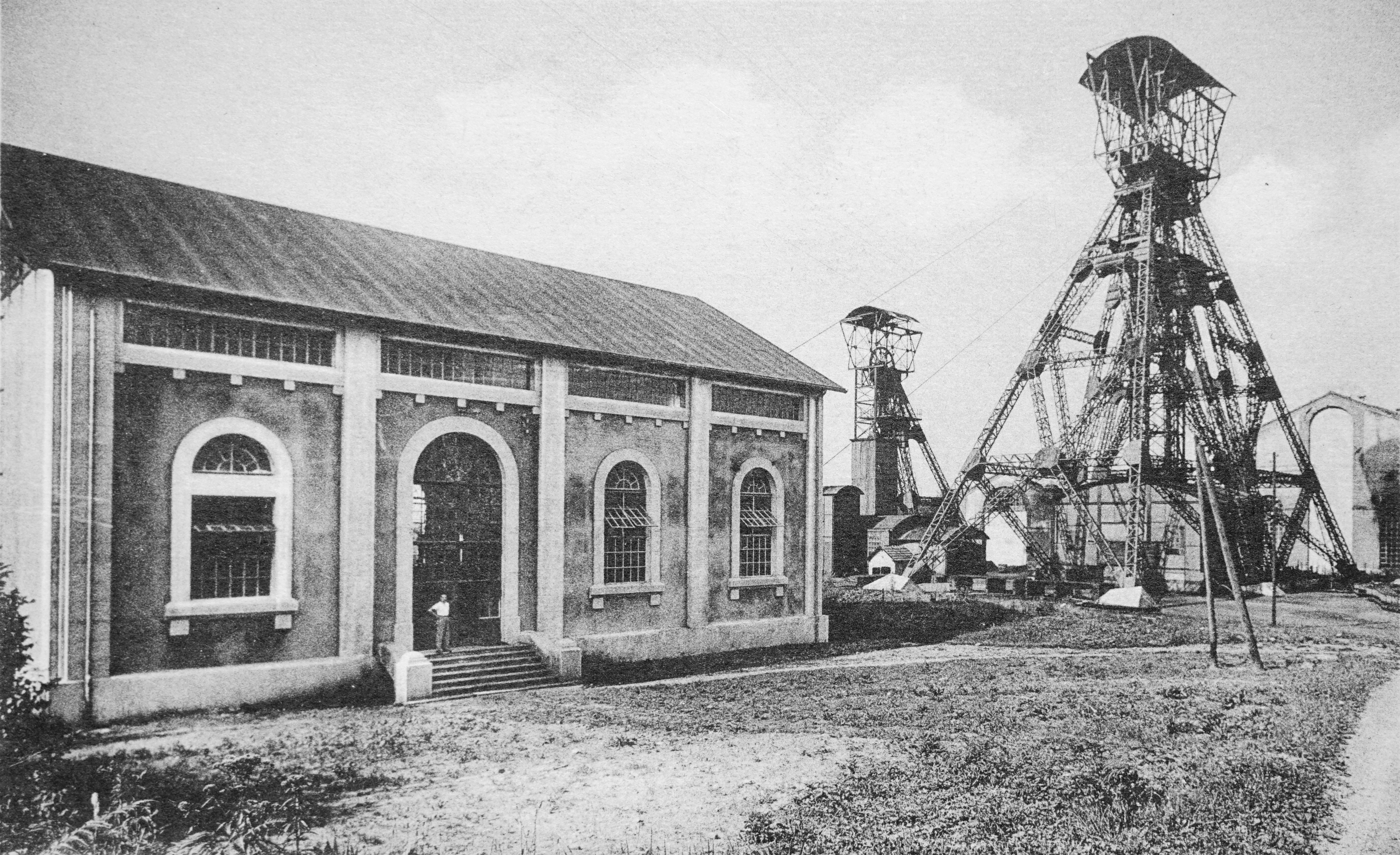

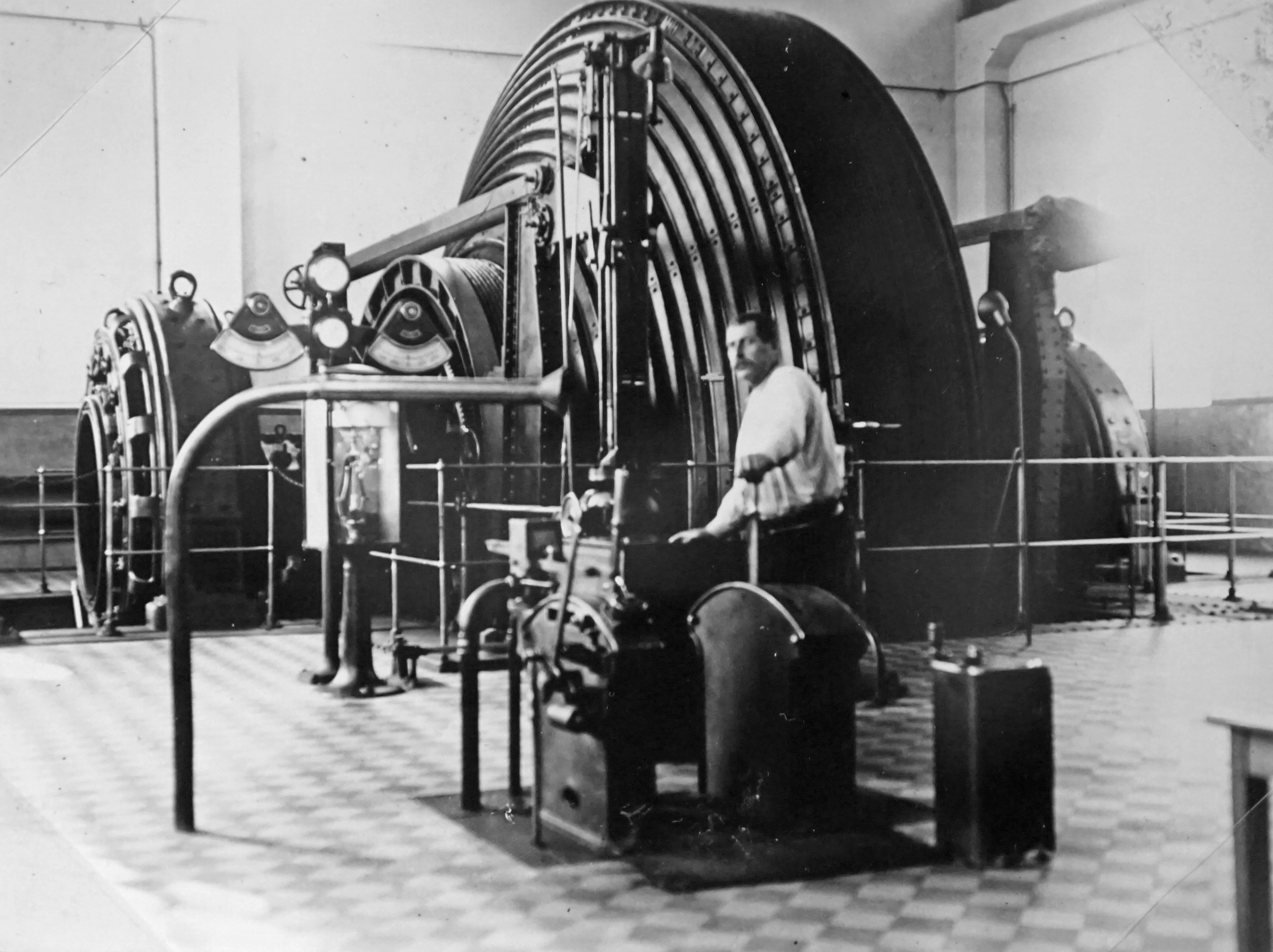

The surroundings of Les Télots mine shaft and ancillary installations circa 1950. Forest Slope tips Mining buildings Company town Water bodies Railroads

== See also ==
=== Connected Articles ===
- Ronchamp Coal Mines
- Sainte Marie Coal Mine
- Notre-Dame Mine Shaft

=== External links ===
- (in French) Les amis du musée de la mine.
- (in French) Cartes postales anciennes du Arthur-de-Buyer, Ronchamp au siècle dernier
- (in French) Fiche du puits Arthur-de-Buyer van BRGM
- Base Mérimée: Puits Arthur-de-Buyer, Ministère français de la Culture. (in French)
