= French ship Bien-Aimé =

Several French ships have borne the name Bien-Aimé ("Well Loved"):

== Naval ships named Bien-Aimé ==
- Bien-Aimée (1672), a row frigate.
- Bien-Aimé (1756), a 58-gun ship of the line.
- Bien-Aimé (1769), a 74-gun ship of the line, lead ship of her class.

== Merchant vessels and privateers ==
- Bien Aimé was a merchant vessel of 600 tons burthen, 24 guns, and 23 men. She was carrying wine, provisions, and dry goods when the British Royal Navy captured her at Martinique in early 1744.
- Bien Aimé was a privateer that on 4 June 1757 captured the English merchant vessel St George, Andrew Ives, master. Some of St George's crew were able to overpower the prize crew and recapture her.
- Bien Aimé was a privateer that HMS Thames captured on 26 September 1760.
- Bien Aimé was a merchant frigate of 20 guns and 85 men. She was on her way to Martinique when on 7 January 1761 she encountered HMS Trent about 10 leagues off Cape Tiburon. Trent captured Bien Aimé after an engagement that left Bien Aimé with 40 men killed and wounded. Trent had one man killed and five wounded.
- Bien Aimé was a privateer of four guns and 52 men that HMS Essex captured on 7 March 1762.
