= Aimé Bergeal =

French politician

- Born: 11 January 1912; Lescure-d'Albigeois, Tarn, France
- Died: 26 September 1973 (aged 61); Mantes-la-Ville, Yvelines, France
- Occupation: Politician
- Political party: Socialist Party

Aimé Bergeal (1912-1973) was a French politician. He served as a member of the French Senate from 1967 to 1973, representing Seine-et-Oise. The Stade Aimé Bergeal in Mantes-la-Ville was named in his memory.
