= Patrick Aimée =

Mauritian footballer

Personal information
- Full name: Jean Patrick Aimée
- Date of birth: 27 August 1976 (age 50)
- Place of birth: Mauritius
- Position: Defender

Senior career*
Years	Team	Apps	(Gls)
2007–2010	Curepipe Starlight SC		
2011–2015	AS Port-Louis 2000		

International career
2002–2007	Mauritius	3	(0)
- * Club domestic league appearances and goals

Patrick Aimée (born 27 August 1976) is a Mauritian former footballer who played as a defender. He won three caps for the Mauritius national football team between 2002 and 2007.
