= Aimé Halbeher =

French political activist (1936–2021)

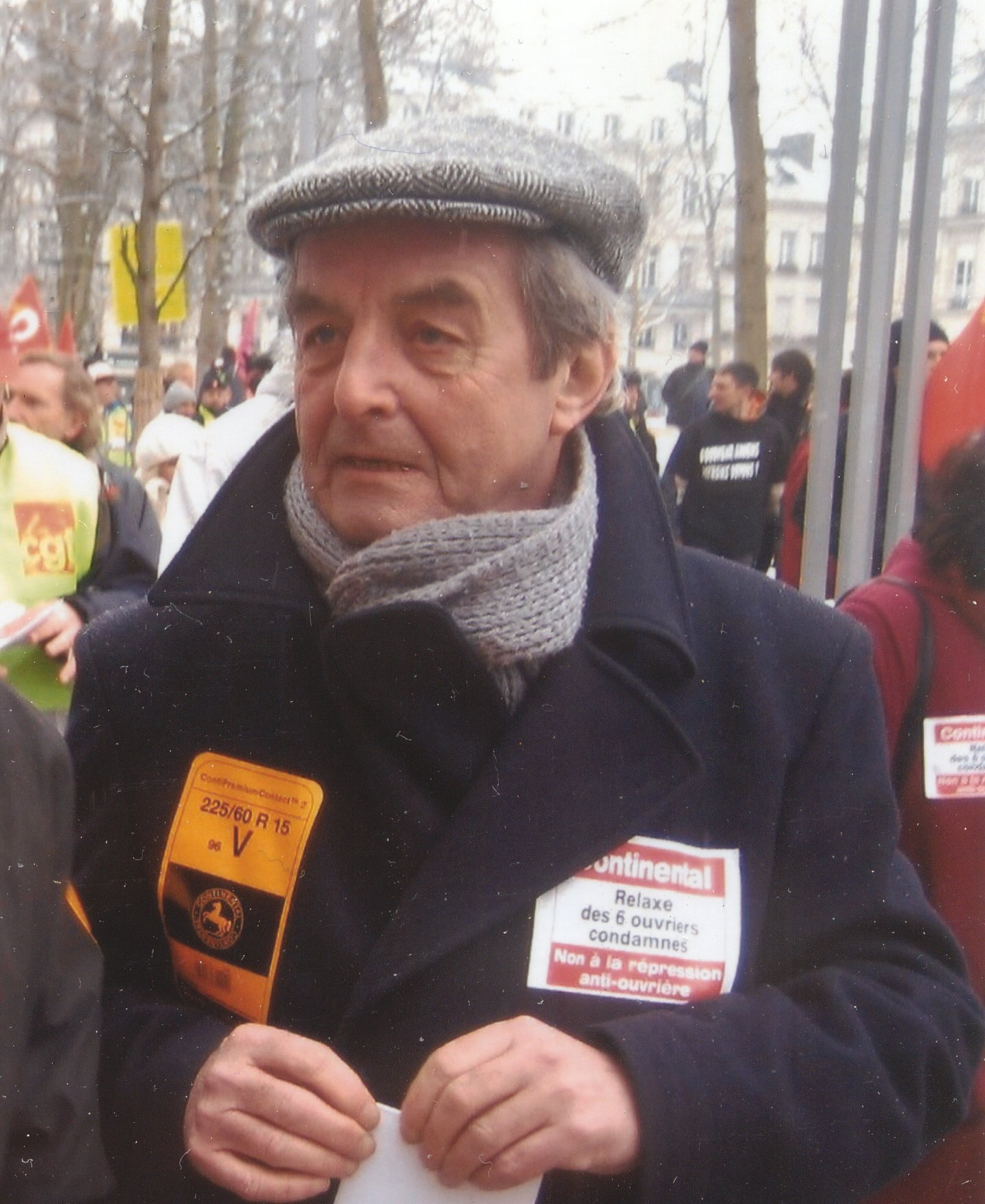
- Halbeher in 2006

Member of the Central Committee of the French Communist Party
- In office 1976–1987

Personal details
- Born: 16 March 1936 14th arrondissement of Paris, France
- Died: 3 August 2021 (aged 85) 12th arrondissement of Paris, France
- Party: PCF
- Occupation: Political activist

Aimé Halbeher (16 March 1936 – 3 August 2021) was a French political activist and syndicalist. He served as Deputy Secretary General of the General Confederation of Labour (CGT) to Renault factories in Boulogne-Billancourt. He was one of the main players of the Metalworkers' Federation factory occupation during May 68. From 1976 to 1987, he was on the Central Committee of the French Communist Party (PCF) and served as Editor-in-Chief of the PCF newsletter Économie & Politique from 1985 to 1989.

== Biography ==
The son of woodworker Roger Halbeher and welder Émilienne Swannet, Aimé grew up in a working class environment in the 12th arrondissement of Paris. He was awarded his certificat d'études primaires and joined the Union de la Jeunesse Républicaine de France in 1950. At the age of 14, he lived through the Henri Martin affair and later the violent strikes in Boulogne-Billancourt in 1950, 1952, and 1953. After earning his certificat d'aptitude professionnelle in 1953, he became a fitter and toolmaker on Île Seguin.

Halbeher joined the CGT in 1954, the same year he joined the PCF. He was sent to fight in the Algerian War for 30 months and was appointed sergeant in 1958 despite his opposition to the war. He was later sent home due to his rebellious faction and opposition to the presidency of Charles de Gaulle. Back in a Renault factory, he was elected a union delegate in March 1960, serving until March 1963. In 1961, he became Deputy Secretary General of the CGT union in Boulogne-Billancourt and of the PCF Seine-Ouest federation. He left the Renault factory in March 1963 and was subsequently elected Secretary General of the CGT union for Renault.

During May 68, Halbeher led the occupation of the Boulogne-Billancourt Renault factory, which lasted for 33 days and 34 nights. He was opposed to any foreign entry into the factory to avoid distortion of the movement and a reason for police intervention. Following the Grenelle agreements, he proposed that workers remain in the factory. Work did not resume until 18 June 1968 following a significant improvement within the Grenelle discussion.

In 1972, Halbeher became a permanent member of the Metalworkers' Federation, responsible for the automotive sector. In 1976, he was elected to the Central Committee of the PCF as a substitute member and became a full member in 1979, where he sat until 1987. He was a candidate in the 1976 French cantonal election for the Canton of Boulogne-sur-Mer-Sud, the 1978 French legislative election, and the 1981 French legislative election. In June 1981, Georges Marchais offered him work in the economic sector of the PCF. He then became Editor-in-Chief of Économie & Politique, serving from 1985 to 1989. He also edited the sections on the automotive sector and social issues from 1983 to 1990.

Uncomfortable with the PCF's alignment with the French government since 1981, Halbeher began to express differences with party leadership in the mid-1980s. In 1987, he left the party's Central Committee following disagreements with National Secretary Robert Hue. In 1990, he left the party's economic sector and moved to the business sector, and in 1994, the employment sector. In 1997, he officially left the party.

In 1997, Halbeher created the Rouges Vifs. In 2001, the organization had allocated 2000 supporters. However, the organization collapsed following a lack of resources and available activists. He maintained his links with the PCF, particularly with members of the economic sector.

Aimé Halbeher died in Paris on 3 August 2021 at the age of 85.
