= Aime Hansen =

Estonian poet

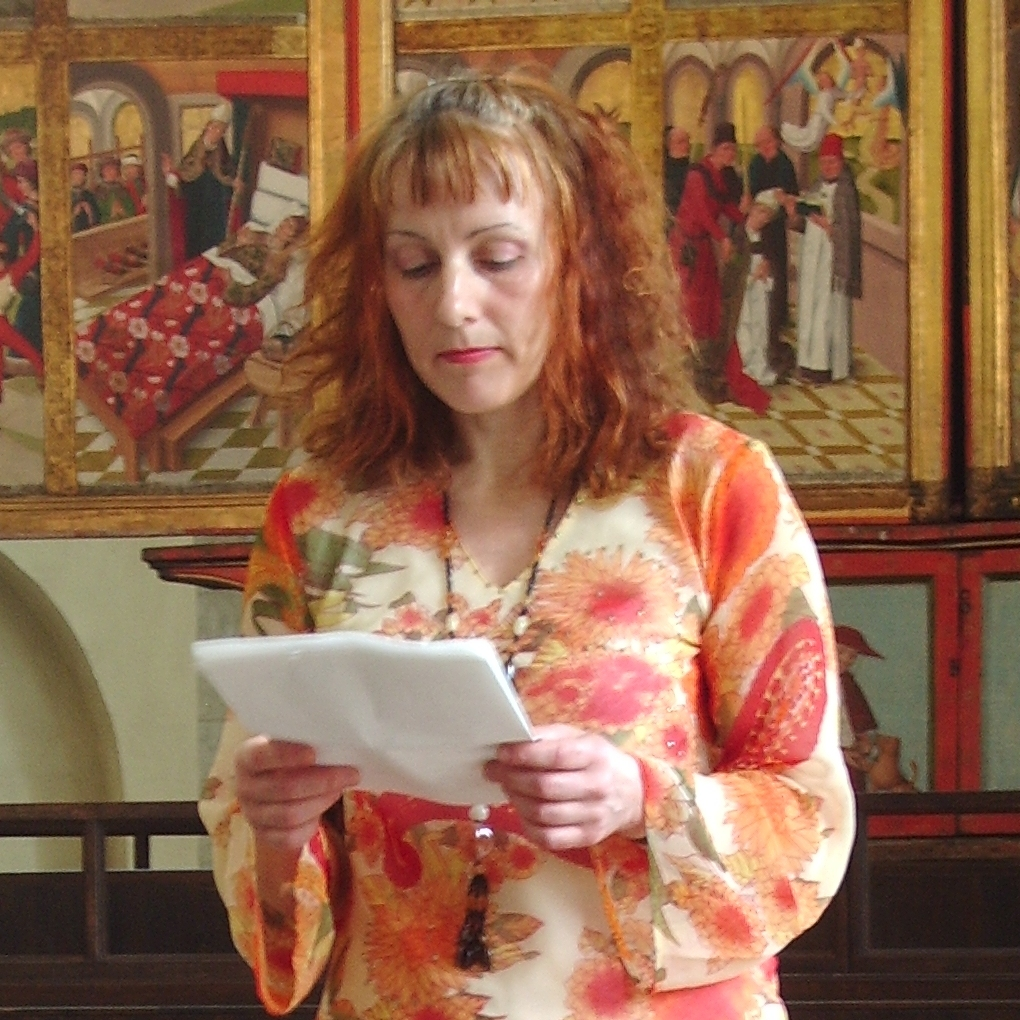
Aime Hansen in 2009

Aime Hansen is an Estonian poet, writer, and artist. She is noted for her works with religious themes and her exploration of the mysticism of life and psychology. In 2009 she authored Jaipur-Delhi-Himaalaja: reisikohvrist leitud lood, a short story collection related to her travels in northern India and the Himalayas. A member of the Estonian Writer's Union, she writes in both Estonian and English.

== Works ==
- "Koduaja tuul", Eesti Raamat (1982)
- "Kalade kuninga maa", Eesti Raamat (1988), ISBN 5450002122
- "Teekond madude saarele", (1990)
- "Jaipur-Delhi-Himaalaja: reisikohvrist leitud lood", Varrak (2009)
- "Ma olin mereingel", Verb (2011)
- "Eestlasena Londonis: kübar jalas, saabas peas", Ajakirjade Kirjastus (2011)
- "Uus-Meremaa sõnas ja pildis", Go Group (2011)
