= Gabriel Bien-Aimé =

Gabriel Bien-Aimé was a former Minister of National Education of Haiti. He was born in Cap-Haïtien, Haiti. From 1994 to 2004 he served as the General Director of Ministry of Religious Affairs. After leaving this post he started Fondespoir, a microfinance organization, in 2001. He was a possible contender for the 2010 Haitian presidential Elections in Haiti.

He served as Minister of National Education from 2006 to 2008. As Minister he stressed to improved education as it is key to building up the country's skills base. “To change this we need more qualified teachers more adequate facilities, classrooms, and teaching materials,” that would complement the EU's funding for teacher training colleges. Minister Bien Aimé wished to reverse figures whereby 80% of education was provided by the private sector and just 20 by the public sector. It would have meant increasing the annual budget spent on education to 8% in 2008, 13% the following year, and then to gradually bring it up to 25%, putting spending on a par with most countries to achieve the eventual aim of “education for all,” as the phrase was employed by the Minister.

He was a Vice President of the Board of KNFP (Konsey Nasyonal Finansman Popile = National Council for Popular Finance) and member of the Board of ANIMH (Association Nationale des Institutions de Micro Finance d’Haïti= National Association of Micro Finance Institutions).

== Death ==
He died of a heart attack on May 15, 2010.
