= Aimé Rakotondrajaona =

Malagasy politician

Aimé Rakotondrajaona is a Malagasy politician. A member of the National Assembly of Madagascar, he was elected as a member of the Tiako I Madagasikara party; he represents the second constituency of Antananarivo.
