= Aimée Leduc =

- Aimée Leduc character
- First appearance: Murder in the Marais
- Created by: Cara Black

In-universe information
- Gender: Female
- Occupation: Private detective
- Nationality: French

Aimée Leduc is a fictional French detective created by American mystery writer Cara Black. Leduc is a Paris-based private investigator with a punk-rock sensibility and keen fashion sense who first appeared in print in 1998.

== Overview ==
Leduc is French, born to an American political activist mother and a French police investigator father. Her mother disappeared when she was eight years old from which point onwards, she was raised by her father, who removed all reminders of her mother's existence from their life.

Each story in the "Aimée Leduc Investigations" series is set in a particular quartier or arrondissement of Paris and is grounded in historical reality. The Parisienne cyber-sleuth's adventures take her to areas of Paris unknown to most readers, off the tourist track and yet often in close proximity to well-known buildings such as the Louvre Museum or Gare du Nord.

We first meet her in Paris during the mid-1990s, where having attended the famous Sorbonne University as a pre-med student, she decided that medicine was not her forte and chose instead to take over her father's "Leduc Detective" agency after his death during a stakeout operation. Described by Booklist as "a delightfully unbuttoned Audrey Hepburn for the twenty-first century”, Leduc is a sharp, fashionable, and quite headstrong young woman who has assumed the investigative mantle left to her by her father. She runs the agency partnership with René Friant, a dwarf friend from her Sorbonne days. They specialize in computer security, but much to René's chagrin, Aimée continually gets drawn into the murky worlds of criminal investigation and espionage. During her investigations, she often finds the need to don a disguise or hack into government computer systems. Aimée often puts herself in danger and at times gets seriously injured.

Wearing Chanel outfits acquired at second-hand shops and living in a drafty 19th-century apartment with her dog Miles Davis, Leduc's bohemian lifestyle can be compared with that of Sherlock Holmes. She is a markedly different character from Georges Simenon's Inspector Jules Maigret who introduced a previous generation of readers to the Paris underworld. Cara Black pays homage to Simenon more than once in the series. In common with other detectives in the literary canon, Aimée's life and work sees her interacting with a host of oddball side characters. Her business partner and best friend René is a stalwart ally, and few would suspect that he's a black belt at Taekwondo. Her godfather Commissaire Morbier was her father's police partner, and he sometimes reluctantly helps her on cases by leaking information to her or applying official leverage. Inspector Melac is her implacable, hardnosed rival on the police force, a kind of Inspector Kramer to her Nero Wolfe.

== Appearances ==
- Murder in the Marais (1998)
- Murder in Belleville (2000)
- Murder in the Sentier (2002)
- Murder in the Bastille (2003)
- Murder in Clichy (2004)
- Murder in Montmartre (2005)
- Murder on the Ile Saint-Louis (2007)
- Murder in the Rue de Paradis (2008)
- Murder in the Latin Quarter (2009)
- Murder in the Palais Royal (2010)
- Murder in Passy
- Murder at the Lanterne Rouge (2012)
- Murder Below Montparnasse (2013)
- Murder in Pigalle (2014)
- Murder on the Champ de Mars (2015)
- Murder on the Quai (2016)
- Murder in Saint-Germain (2017)
- Murder on the Left Bank (2018)
- Murder in Bel-Air (2019)
- Murder at the Porte de Versailles (2022)
