= Taina Bien-Aimé =

Swiss activist

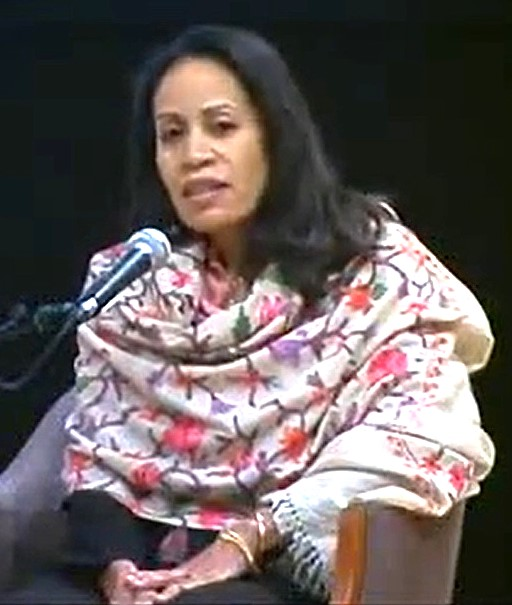
Bien-Aimé speaks at the Brooklyn Museum in 2008

Taina Bien-Aimé is the Executive Director of the Coalition Against Trafficking in Women and a founding member of Equality Now.

== Early life ==
Bien-Aimé grew up in Switzerland and worked at the University of Geneva. She then went to NYU School of Law to become a lawyer, and received the Vanderbilt Medal while there. In addition to a law degree, she also holds a License in Political Science from the University of Geneva's Graduate Institute of International Studies in Switzerland.

== Career ==
In 1992, Bien-Aimé took a job at the firm Cleary Gottlieb Steen & Hamilton, and she stayed there for four years. While there, she met Jessica Neuwirth, who had previously worked at Amnesty International. The two helped start the organization Equality Now. In 1996, Bien-Aimé then went on to work for HBO for four years as the Director of Business Affairs/Film Acquisitions. She then became a full-time member of Equality Now, and was its executive director from 2001-2011. While there, Equality Now started campaigns against sex tourism and the Fund for Grassroots Activism to End Sex Trafficking. She was also the Executive Director of the Women's City Club of New York. In 2014, she became the Executive Director of the Coalition Against Trafficking in Women. While there, she was involved in the development of laws such as Protocol to Prevent, Suppress and Punish Trafficking in Persons, especially Women and Children, The Trafficking Victims Protection Act, and the New York State Human Trafficking Act. She also writes for the Huffington Post.

== Honors and awards ==
In 2007, she received the Susan B. Anthony Award from the National Organization for Women. She received the Phoenix Award from the New York Asian Women's Center in 2008. In 2009, she received the New York County Lawyers’ Association Edith I. Spivack Award. In 2011, she received both the Black Latino Asian-Pacific American Law Alumni Association Distinguished Alumni Award and NYU Law Alumni Association Award for Distinguished Service in the Public Interest.
