= Paul Duvivier =

French journalist

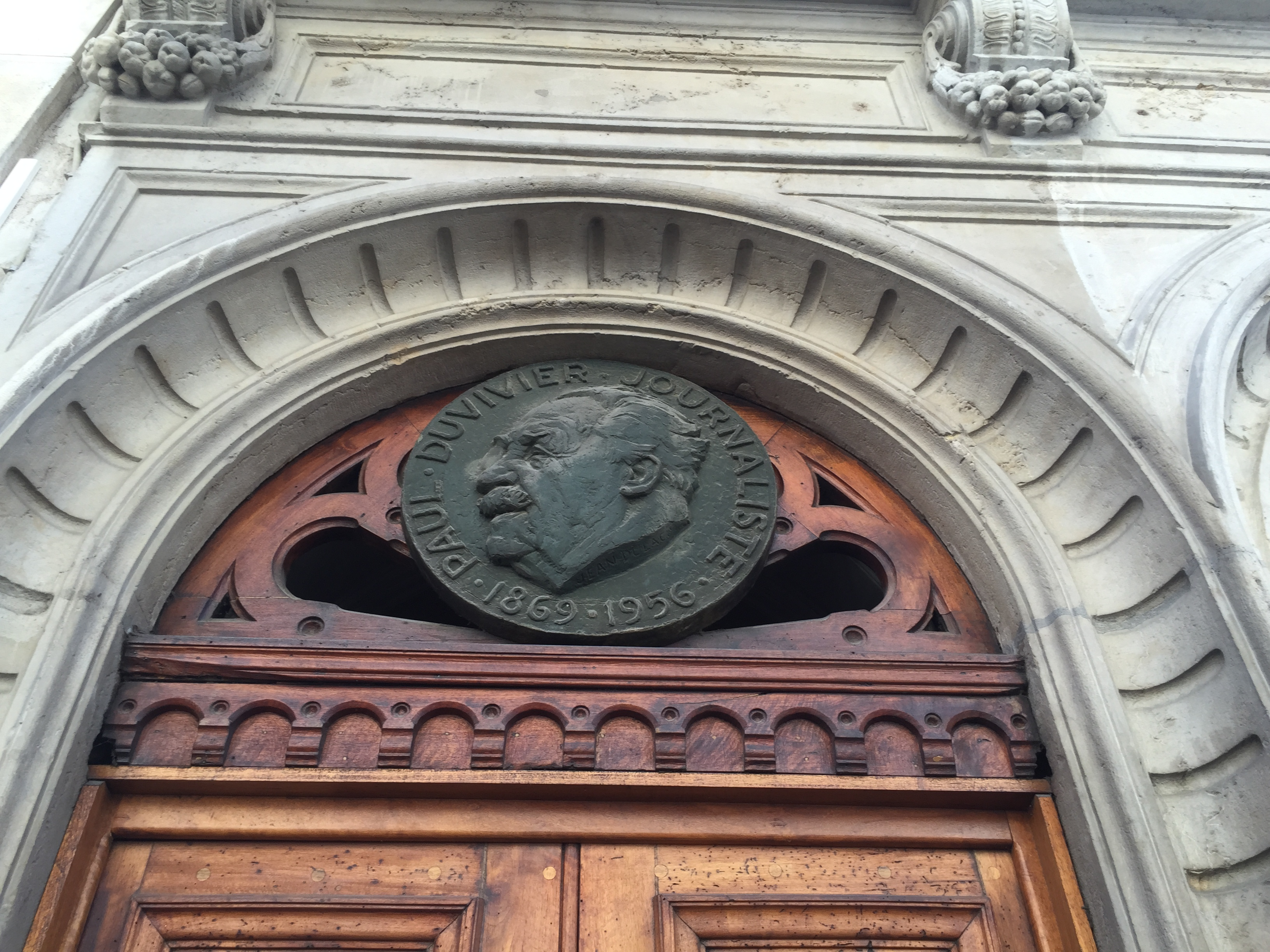
Plaque representing Paul Duvivier at Lyon

Paul Auloge-Duvivier, known as Paul Duvivier, (19 July 1869 – 1956), was a French journalist at Lyon. He was also consul of Colombia at Lyon. He was the founder of the newspaper Tout Lyon.

There is a street named Paul Duvivier at Lyon.
