= Aimé Leon Meyvis =

Belgian-American painter

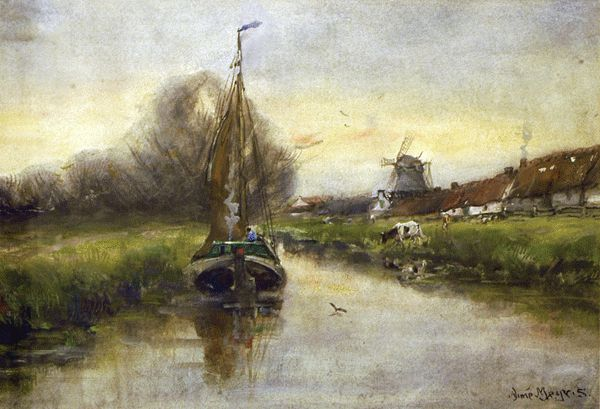
"Boat on the River"

Aimé Leon Meyvis (1877 in Sint-Gillis-Waas, Flanders – 1932) was a Flemish landscape painter who immigrated to East Rochester, New York in 1902. He became a member of the group known as the Finger Lakes Regional Artists. Meyvis studied at The Royal Academy in The Hague in the Netherlands. He exhibited at the 3rd Exhibition of Contemporary Artists in Washington, D.C., the National Academy of Design, the Pennsylvania Academy of the Fine Arts, The Art Institute of Chicago and the Rochester Art Club. Most of his work was done in oils.
