= French frigate Bien-Aimée (1672) =

Ship of the line of the French Navy

History

France
- Name: Bien-Aimée (sometimes written Bien-Aimé or Bienaymée)
- Ordered: 24 April 1671
- Builder: Toulon
- Laid down: 31 October 1671
- Launched: 20 March 1672
- In service: 1672
- Out of service: 1693

General characteristics
- Tonnage: 300 tons
- Sail plan: Full-rigged ship
- Complement: 150 men
- Armament: 20 to 24 guns

Bien-Aimée was a rowing frigate of the French Navy, designed by Engineer Chapelle.

== Career ==
Bien-Aimée was part of the squadron under Tourville that cruised off Tunis and Algiers in 1679.
