= Aimé Brun =

French philatelist

Aimé Brun (28 June 1887 – 1 July 1969) was a French philatelist who was added to the Roll of Distinguished Philatelists in 1948.

Brun was a noted philatelic expertiser in the 1950s and 60s and the grandfather of Jean-François Brun.
