= Aime (Estonian name) =

Female given name

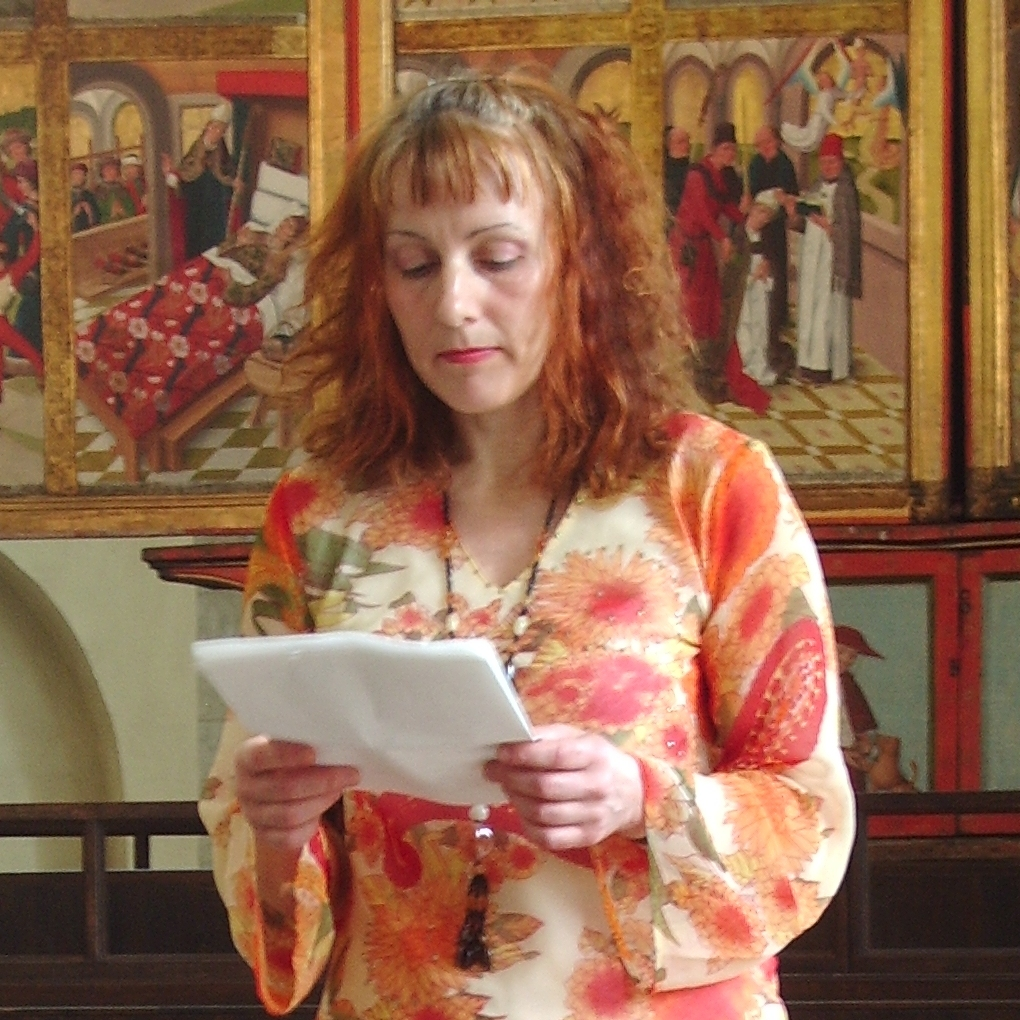
- Estonian poet Aime Hansen in 2009
- Gender: Female
- Language: Estonian
- Name day: 26 October

Origin
- Region of origin: Estonia

Other names
- Related names: Aimi, Amanda, Ami, Manda

Aime is an Estonian feminine given name.

As of 1 January 2022, 1,761 women in Estonia have the first name Aime, making it the 95th most popular female name in the country. The name is most commonly found in Järva County, where 27.67 per 10,000 inhabitants of the county bear the name. Individuals bearing the name Aime include:

- Aime Jürjo (1928–2022), Estonian sculptor
- Aime Hansen (born 1962), Estonian poet, writer, and artist
- Aime Lutsar (1947–2013), Estonian actress, director and playwright
- Aime Mäemets (1930–1996), Estonian botanist and hydrobiologist
- Aime Maripuu (born 1934), Estonian writer
- Aime Pesur (born 1945), Estonian technical scientist
- Aime Sügis (born 1935), Estonian chemist and politician
