= Aimé Duval =

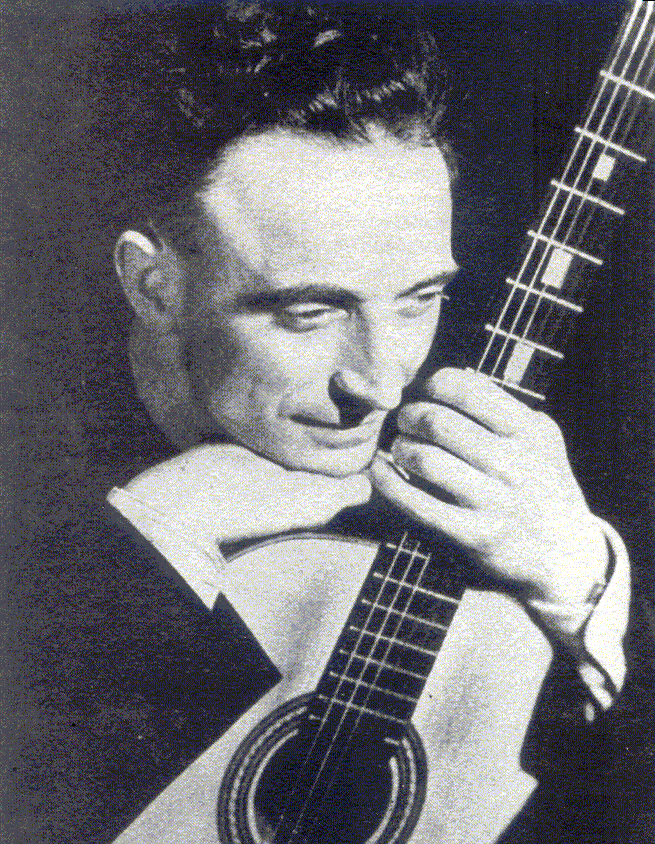
- Father Aimé Duval
- Born: Aimé, Lucien Duval; 30 June 1918; Le Val-d'Ajol
- Died: 30 April 1984 (aged 65); Metz
- Occupation(s): Priest; Singer

Aimé Duval (better known under the name Père Duval) (30 June 1918 – 30 April 1984) was a French priest of the Society of Jesus, a singer-songwriter and guitarist, who was very successful in the 1950s and 1960s.

== Biography ==
Born in Le Val-d'Ajol in the Vosges department, Lucien Duval was baptized in Plombières. After a few years of primary school, he went to a Jesuit college in Brussels in 1930, already with the desire to become a priest. During this period he wrote a first chanson. In 1936, he joined the Jesuits and studied Catholic theology. On July 24, 1944, he received priest ordination in Enghien, Belgium. He was first employed as a French teacher in Reims until he was able to devote himself entirely to music.

A few years after his ordination, Duval began to write songs and to present them first in pubs and cafés. Soon he was invited to give concerts. His tours took him all over Europe: he gave 3000 concerts in 45 countries. His concert in (West-) Berlin had 30,000 visitors. The chancellor Konrad Adenauer gave him a guitar "as a thank you for the joy he had brought to young people". In 1965 Père Duval was the first priest to sing "behind the Iron Curtain": he gave a free concert in Warsaw. He also performed in America.

His first record was issued in 1956. In 1961 he had already sold more than one million records. Altogether he published 14 recordings.

The stress of touring and composing led him to an alcohol disorder that quickly escalated. In February 1969 he made a suicide attempt, and then an alcohol detoxification in Versailles after his rescue. He fought for addiction to be recognized as a disease. In the same year he suffered a relapse. From then on, he regularly visited the meetings of the Alcoholics Anonymous. In order to help his fellow-sufferers, he dictated on a long drive a ruthless account of his addiction, which he published shortly before his death as a book: L’enfant qui jouait avec la lune -"The child who played with the Moon"- (ISBN 9782706707391). The book, which became a bestseller, was only signed under the author first name: Lucien; As subtitle was his self-description: Chanteur, Jésuite, Alcoolique.

Aimé Duval died on 30 April 1984 after a concert he gave in Metz and was buried in Nancy.

== Musical work ==
He presented his chansons himself and accompanied them with his guitar (which is why he was called "Guitarist of God" in France). Georges Brassens greatly appreciated him and mentioned him in his song Les Trompettes de la renommée. Duval was one of the pioneers of the Neues Geistliches Lied. The Catholic theologian Karl Rahner honored Duval's poems and compositions as a song that emerges from the heart.

== Singer ==
Some songs:

- La Nuit
- Rue des Longues Haies
- À Bilbao
- Par la main
- J'ai joué de la flûte
- Les Faces de carême (Ris ou pleure, fais quelque chose...)
- Il y avait beaucoup de monde
- Le Seigneur reviendra
- Seigneur, mon ami
- Pourquoi viens-tu si tard ?
- L'Espérance morte
- La P'tite Tête
- Comme un soldat
- Dans le ciel
- Le Vieux Jo
- Le ciel est rouge
- Marie-Thérèse

== Bibliography, discography ==
- Lucien (a pseudonym: that was his second first name), L'Enfant qui jouait avec la lune, Mulhouse, 1983.
- Paul Tihon : Le Père Duval ou la chanson fraternelle, Brussels, 1960.
- Ignacio Echaniz : Passion and Glory (vol.4), Anand (India), Gujarat Sahitya Prakash, 2000, pp. 236–243.
- Intégrale 1956-1961 : coffret 4 CD, Monthabor Music, 2014-2016
