= Aimée Duvivier =

French artist (born 1766)

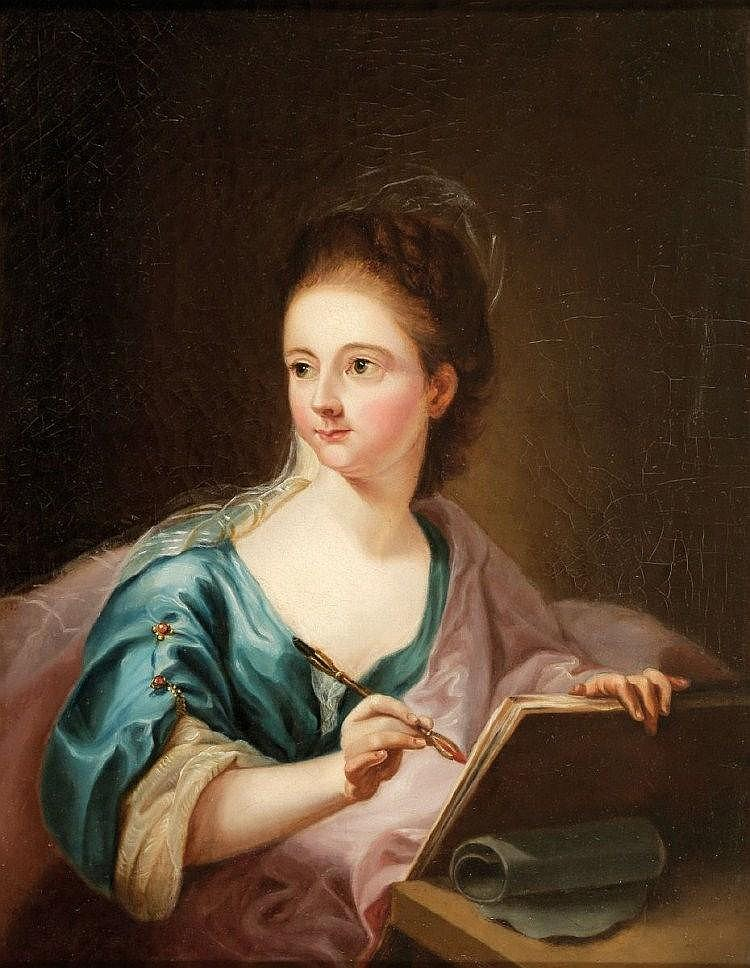
Self-portrait by Aimée Duvivier

Aimée Duvivier (born 1766) was a French painter.

Duvivier was born either in Saint-Domingue or in Paris. Her father, Pierre-Charles Duvivier (1716–1780), was the director of the Savonnerie manufactory; her mother was Marie-Jeanne-Colombe Gromaire (died 1801). She was a pupil of Jean-Baptiste Greuze and exhibited at the Salon de la Jeunesse in 1786 and again in 1787. In 1791 she appeared at the Paris Salon, where her self-portrait attracted favorable notices. A few paintings have survived, but none of the work she is known to have produced in pastel is known to exist. Many details of Duvivier's biography remain obscure; even the year of her death is unclear, and has been given variously as 1824, 1834, and 1852.

== In popular culture ==
A partial section of her painting of Armand Louis de Boulanger is featured on the cover of Stars of the Lid's debut album Music for Nitrous Oxide.

== Gallery ==
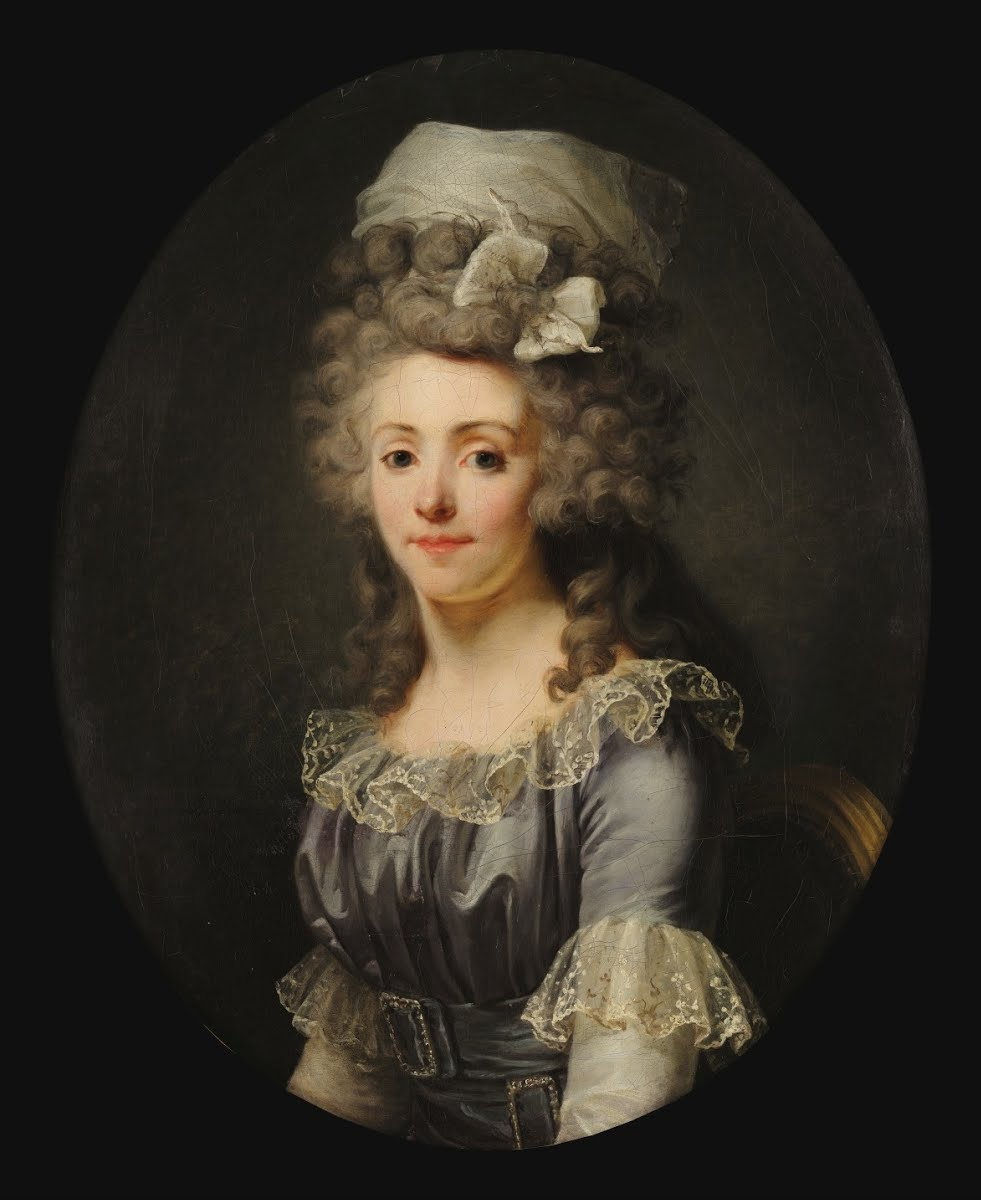
Self-portrait, 1790 (Accorsi-Ometto Museum)

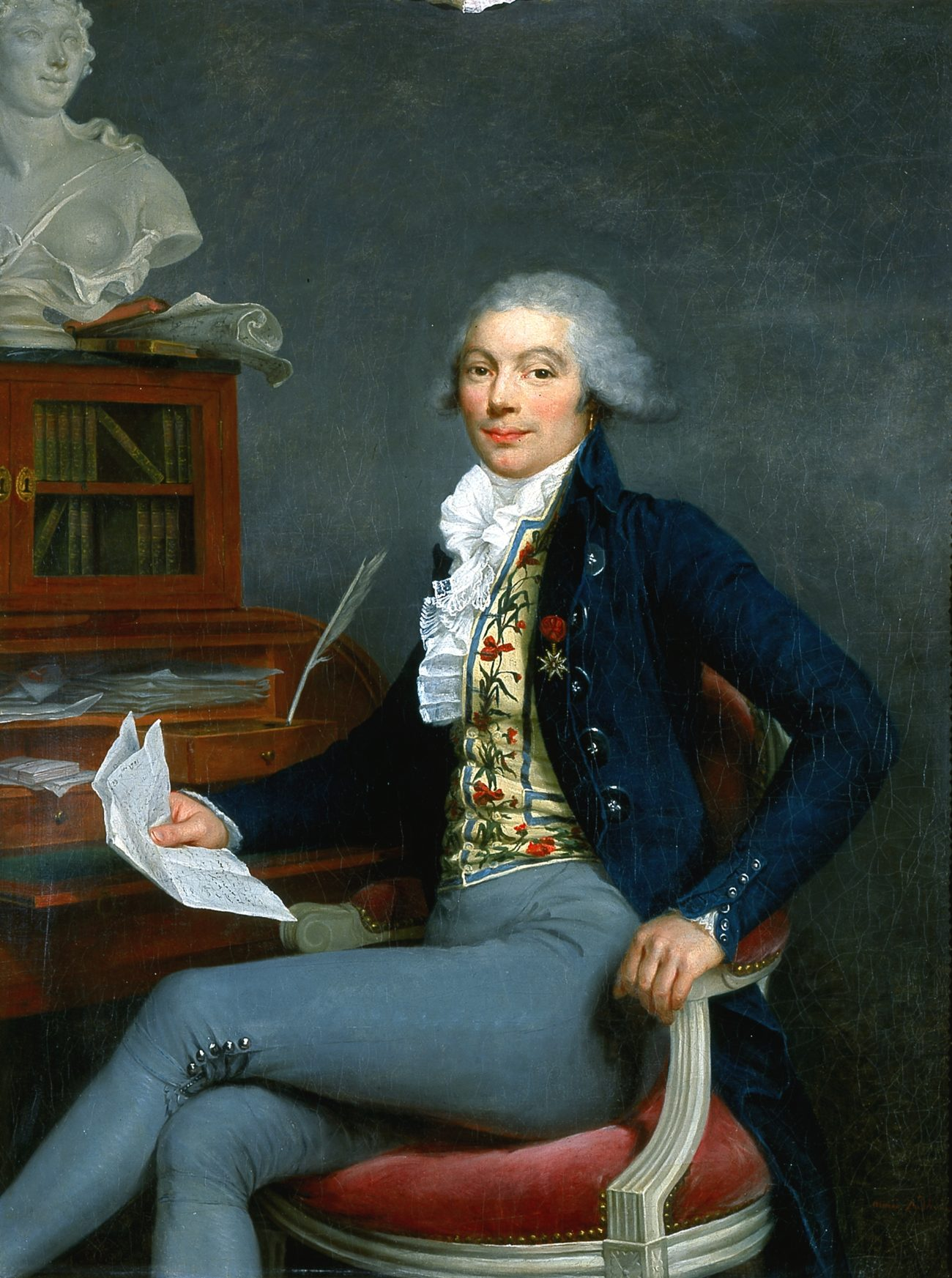
Armand Louis Le Boulanger, Marquis d’Acqueville, c. 1791-1796 (Blanton Museum of Art)

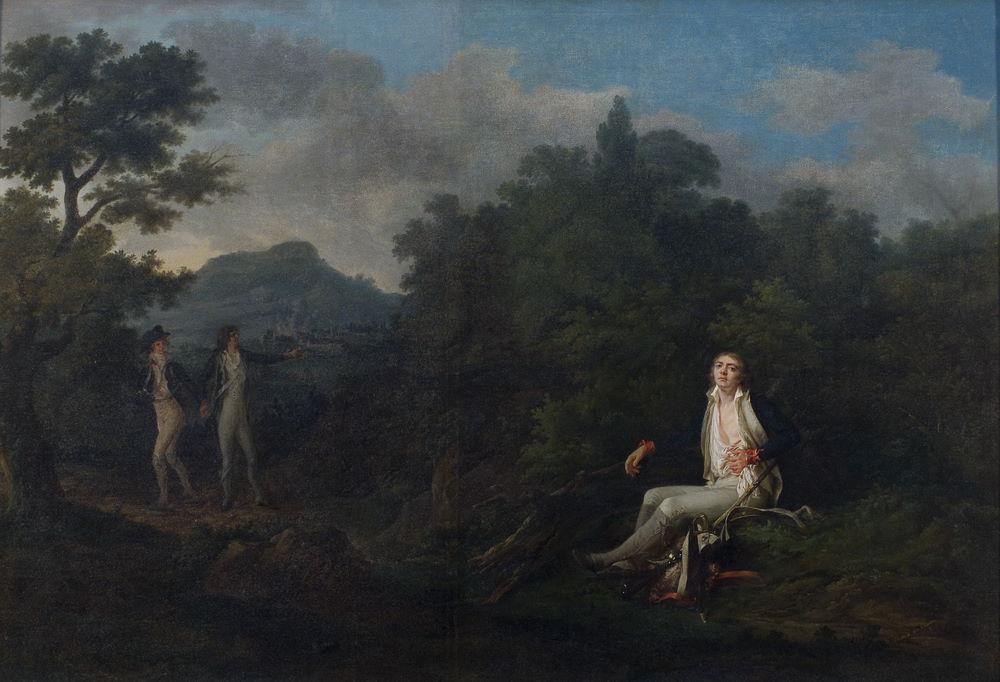
Wounded Soldier, 1797 (Musée des Beaux-Arts de La Rochelle)

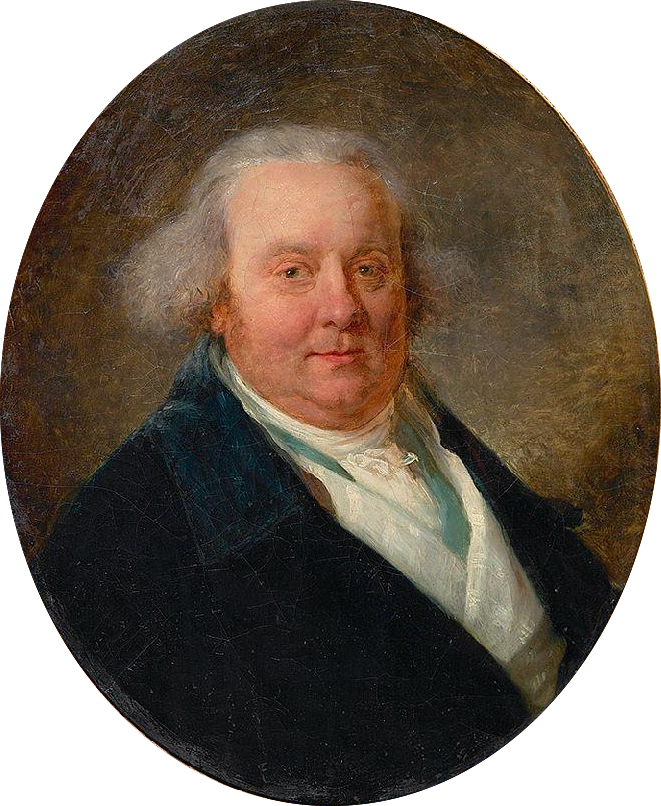
Portrait of Gottfried Abraham de Heimbach, 1801 (Musée des Beaux-Arts de La Rochelle)
