= Aimé Martin =

French writer

Aimé Martin (1781–1844) was a French writer. Born in Lyon, he moved to Paris, where he became the pupil and friend of Bernardin de St. Pierre: he collected his works and married his widow. Martin's letters to Sophia on Natural History were highly popular.
