= Aimee Phan =

American author, of Vietnamese descent (born 1977)

- Born: 1977 (age 48–49); Orange County, California, U.S.
- Education: University of California, Los Angeles (BA); Iowa Writers' Workshop (MFA)
- Occupations: Novelist, educator

Aimee Phan (born 1977) is an American novelist and educator of Vietnamese descent. She teaches at the California College of the Arts in San Francisco, California.

== Early life and education ==
Aimee Phan was born in 1977 and raised in Orange County, California. Her mother was a social worker in the Little Saigon neighborhood.

She received a BA degree in English from the University of California, Los Angeles (UCLA); and received a MFA degree from the Iowa Writers' Workshop, where she won a Maytag Fellowship.

== Career ==
Her first novel, We Should Never Meet (2004), is about American foster children from Vietnam, during the Vietnam War. We Should Never Meet (2004) was named a notable book by the Kiriyama Prize in fiction, and was a finalist for the 2005 Asian American Literary Awards. Her writing has appeared in The New York Times, Virginia Quarterly Review, USA Today and The Oregonian among other publications.

Phan worked from fall 2005 to summer 2007 as an assistant professor in English at Washington State University. She teaches as an associate professor in writing and literature at the California College of the Arts in San Francisco, California.

She resides in Berkeley, California with her husband and two kids.

== Selected works ==
Books

- We Should Never Meet: Stories (2004, St. Martin's Press)
- The Reeducation of Cherry Truong: A Novel (2012, St. Martin's Press)

Essays

- Phan, Aimee (February 24, 2014). "Why Mainstream Critics Fail Writers of Color". Salon. Archived from the original on February 25, 2014.
- The Price of Urban Family Living in The New York Times' The Motherlode
- Housed in Guernica
- The Disciples of Memory in The Rumpus
- Where They Came From in The New York Times

== Awards and honors ==
- 2004, Association of Asian American Studies Book Award
- 2005, Finalist for the Asian American Literary Awards in Fiction
- 2005, Kiriyama Prize Notable Book
- 2010, National Endowment of the Arts Creative Writing Fellowship
- 2014, Rockefeller Foundation Bellagio Center Residency

== Reviews ==
- Carmela Ciuraru, September 29, 2004, We Should Never Meet by Aimee Phan, The Los Angeles Times
- Anhoni Patel, September 19, 2004, We Should Never Meet by Aimee Phan, San Francisco Chronicle
- Jee Yoon Lee, May 10, 2012 The Reeducation of Cherry Truong by Aimee Phan in Hyphen Magazine
- Susan M. Lee, March 8, 2012 The Reeducation of Cherry Truong by Aimee Phan in In the Fray Magazine
