= Accorsi-Ometto Museum =

- Museo Accorsi-Ometto
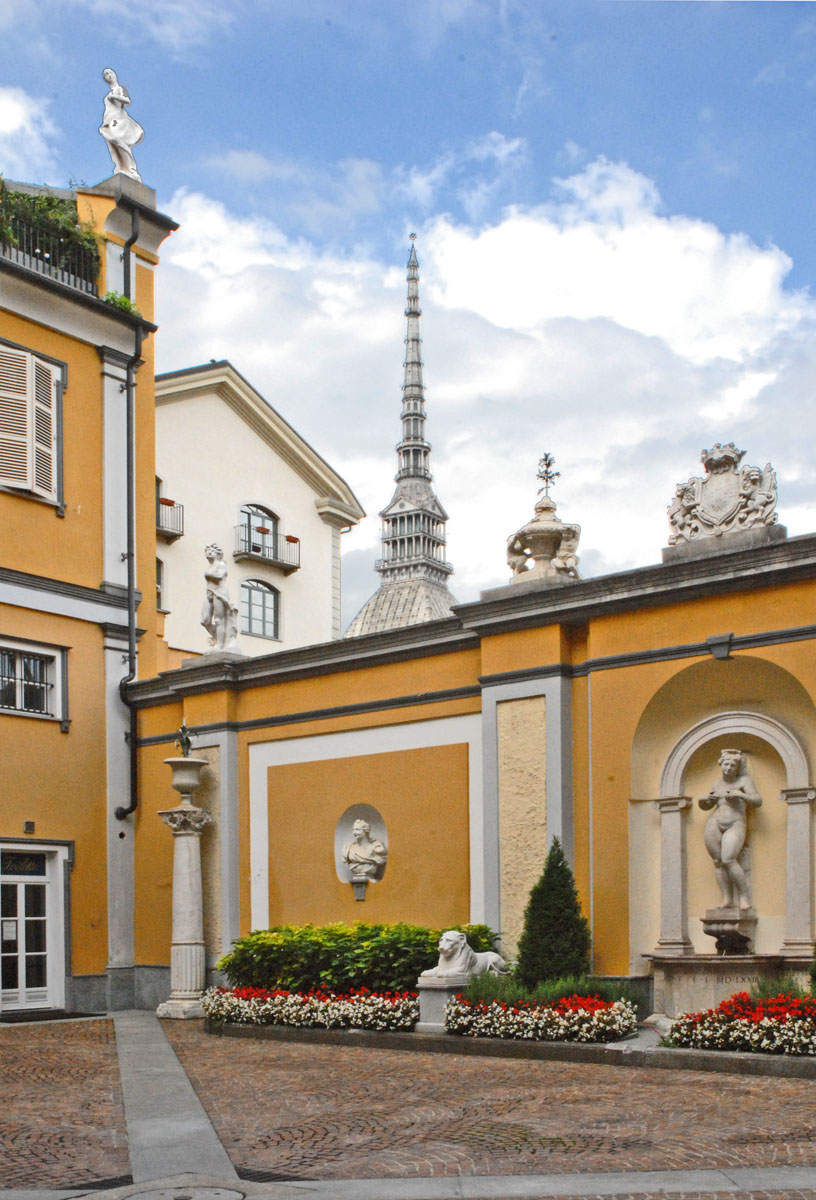
- The Museum of Decorative Arts presents the collection of mainly 18th century objects.
- Interactive fullscreen map
- Former name: Fondazione Accorsi-Ometto
- Established: 1956
- Location: Via Po 55, Turin, Italy
- Coordinates: 45°03′59″N 7°41′35″E
- Type: Decorative arts museum
- Founder: Pietro Accorsi
- Website: Homepage

The Accorsi–Ometto Museum is a private museum based in Turin, northern Italy. It is chronologically the first decorative arts museum in Italy. The museum was originated from a legacy left by Pietro Accorsi (Turin, 1891–1982) and was opened by Giulio Ometto, president for life of the "Fondation Pietro Accorsi" and Director ad interim of the museum.

== The palace ==
The collection is located in a historical building in the Via Po, designed by the Savoy's court architect, Amedeo of Castellamonte and dates back to the late 17th century (1684). When Pietro Accorsi's father became custodian of the palace, in 1901, the family moved into a relatively small flat that looked onto the courtyard.

== The museum ==
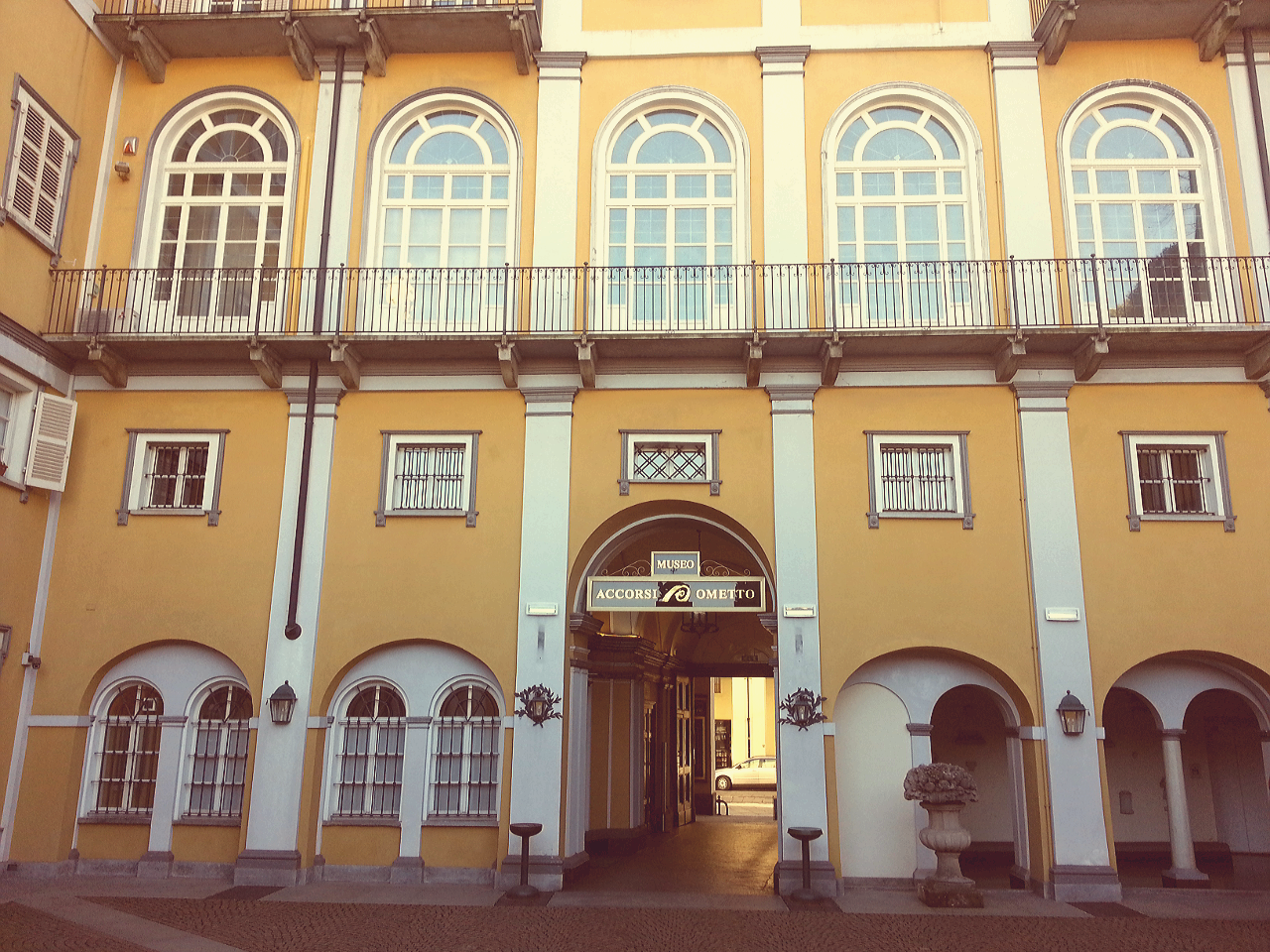
The 'Accorsi – Ometto Museum.

The route through the museum leads through 27 rooms, divided into two sections: the first presents the exhibition of pieces from the 18th and 19th centuries, in particular Baccarat crystals, silverware, and Meissen porcelain. The second section presents furniture reconstructing the ambiance of a refined home of the 18th century, in accordance with the antique dealer's taste. The style represented here, according to historical records, was fashionable for about fifty years in Turin's leading homes. Particularly remarkable is the Piffetti's room, dedicated to the secrétaire-cabinet in rare wood with ivory and tortoiseshell, made in 1738 by Pietro Piffetti. This trumeau is considered a masterpiece of the Piedmont cabinet maker.

== Gallery ==
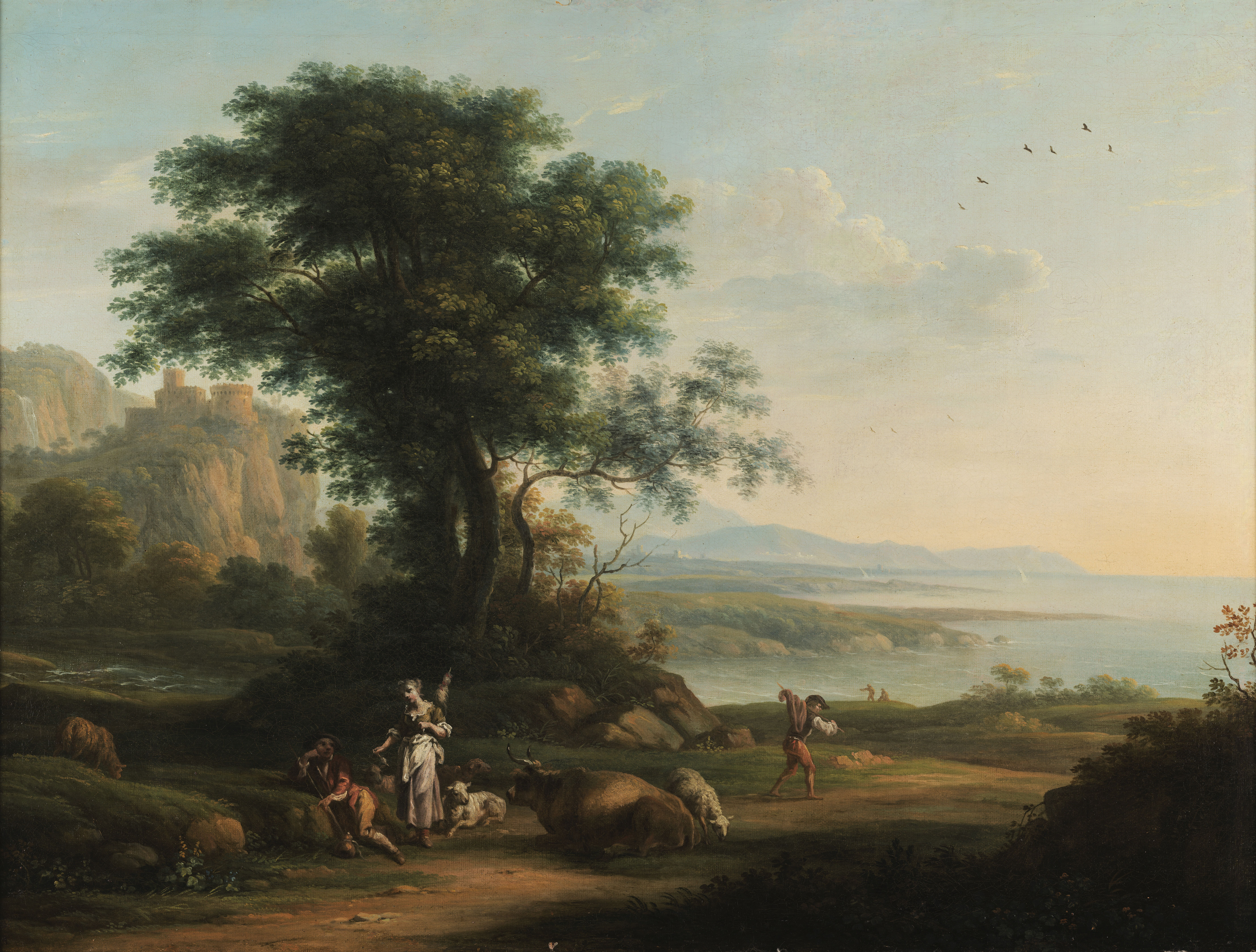
François Boucher

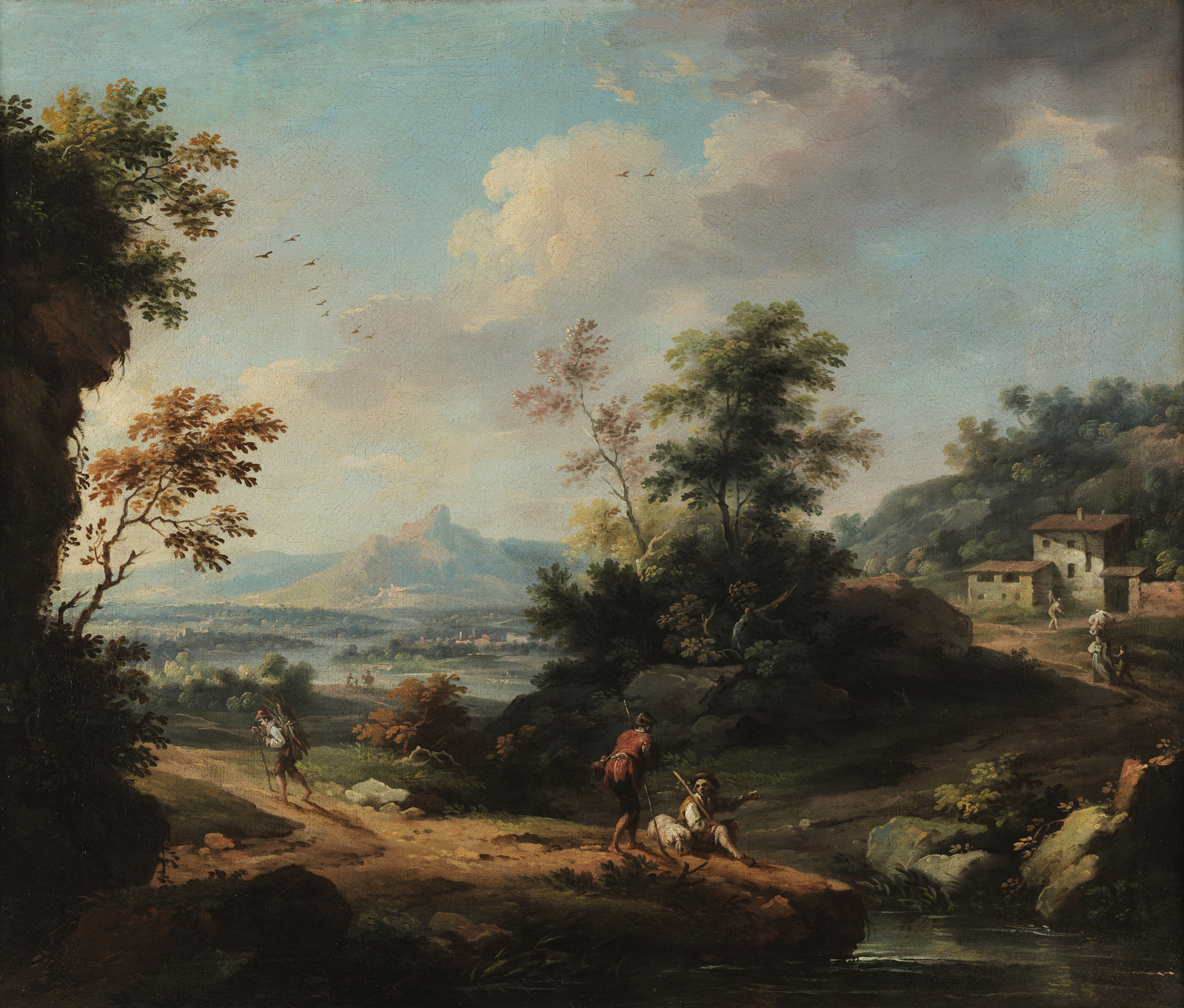
Vittorio Amedeo Cignaroli
