= Aimée Croysdill =

- Born: Aimée Katherine Croysdill; April 1989 (age 37)
- Education: London College of Fashion
- Children: 1

Aimée Katherine Croysdill (born April 1989) is an English fashion stylist.

== Early life ==
Croysdill was born in Surrey and grew up in Winchester. Her great-grandfather on her paternal side was the first womenswear tailor on Savile Row. A dancer in her youth, Croysdill took classes at the Florian School of Dance and traveled to Basingstoke and London to participate in dance companies. She attended Peter Symonds College, where she completed A Levels in Dance, Philosophy, and English Literature in 2007. She went on to study at the London College of Fashion, graduating with a Bachelor of Science in Fashion Management. She knew she wanted to go into fashion, but it was not until she worked as an assistant stylist to costume designers that she decided to become a stylist.

== Career ==
Early in her career, Croysdill styled a number of music videos for artists such as Noisettes, Slow Club's "Beginners" featuring Daniel Radcliffe, AlunaGeorge's "You Know You Like It" with Ella Eyre, and Duran Duran's "Girl Panic" with Vanessa Coyle. She worked on Michael Daks' The Butterfly Collector for The Untitled Magazine and styled musician Laura Mvula for events such as The Graham Norton Show and London Fashion Week.

In 2013, Croysdill began working with Blue Jasmine actress Sally Hawkins and would style her for the 2014 awards season, including Hawkins' Golden Globe and Academy Awards red carpet looks in William Vintage and Valentino Haute Couture respectively.

Croysdill collaborated with the group Clean Bandit on the music videos for "Rockabye" and "Symphony" featuring Zara Larsson. She would also style them for album covers and events. She also worked with Laura Haddock and Charlotte Hope; Croysdill and Hope had gone to school together. From 2015 to 2018, Croysdill's clientele expanded to the likes of Natalie Dormer, Olivia Cooke, Lara Stone, Charlotte Riley, and Dina Asher-Smith. In 2019, Croysdill did editorials for the likes of Keeley Hawes, which appeared in publications such as The Scotsman, YOU Magazine, and The Sunday Times.

With Tom Russell, Croysdill co-founded the children's wear brand Kiso Apparel, which launched in 2020. At the start of the Netflix period drama Bridgerton press cycle, Croysdill became known for styling actress Nicola Coughlan at various events, including Croysdill's first Met Gala. Her other clients include Anna Shaffer and Marisa Abela.

In autumn 2023, Croysdill, Cher Coulter and Holly Eva White curated the Choose Love pop-up boutique on Carnaby Street.

== Personal life ==
Croysdill has a daughter.
