= Ronchamp coal mine railway =

Former industrial rail network serving the Ronchamp coal mines

Ronchamp coal mines
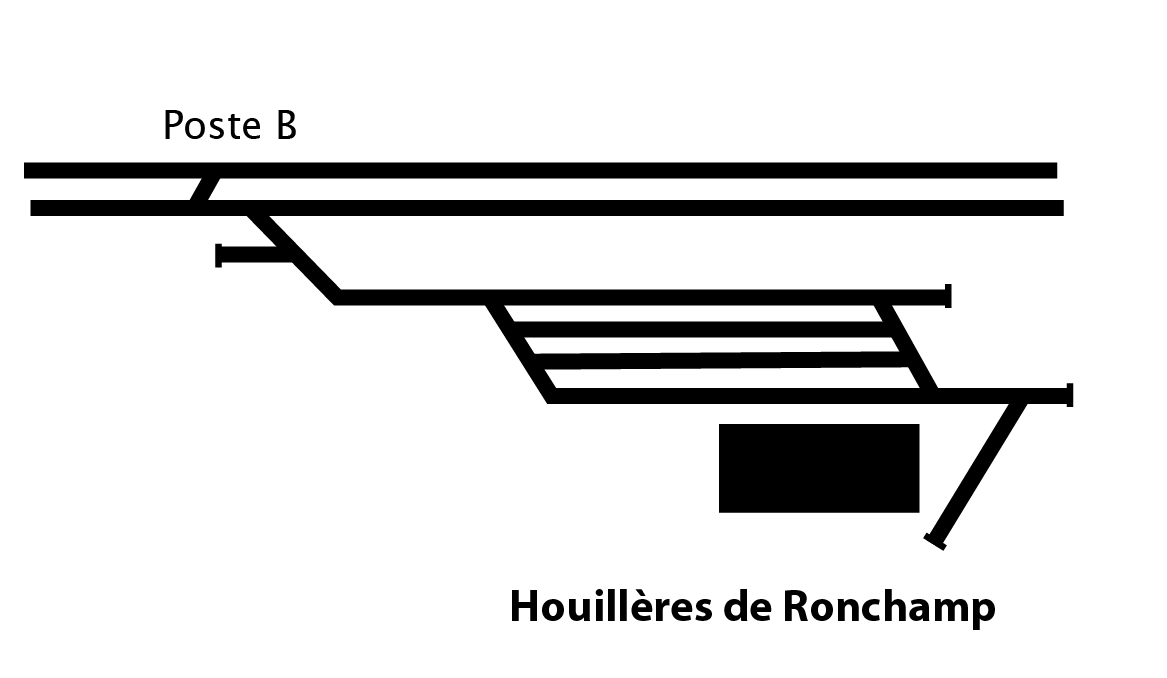
- Layout of the station in 1962

General information
- Location: Industrial Street; France
- Owner: Ronchamp coal mines
- Operator: Ronchamp coal mines

History
- Opened: 1850
- Closed: 1958

Services
Transportation of coal
Location

The Ronchamp coal mine railway is a former industrial rail track serving the Ronchamp coal mines. It is located in the French department of Haute-Saône and the region of Bourgogne-Franche-Comté. The link between the mines' local rail network and the line from Paris-Est to Mulhouse-Ville runs near the Ronchamp station via a particular station connected to the main line.

The station operated from the mid-19th century until 1958, when the mines closed. Following the closure, the station was dismantled. By the early 21st century, the site of the station had become overgrown, with only a few remnants of the installations and network remaining.

== History ==
The opening of coal mines in the communes of Ronchamp and Champagney occurred in the mid-18th century. Until the mid-19th century, coal was transported solely by horse- and ox-drawn wagons along the route from Paris to Basel. In 1857, the Compagnie des chemins de fer de l'Est constructed the Paris-Est to Mulhouse-Ville line, which prompted the Société civile des houillères de Ronchamp to establish a rail network between its various pits. This network was connected to the Chemin de fer de l'Est network via a branch line near the Ronchamp station. A new station was constructed in the vicinity of the Saint-Charles shaft to facilitate the transportation of coal.

The station operated for a century before being dismantled following the closure of the mines in 1958. The responsibility for this task fell to EDF, which had owned the Ronchamp coal mines since nationalization in 1946. In the 1960s and 1970s, the building was used as a garage for former steam locomotives of the national rail network. In 1998, the building housing the mining locomotives was partially demolished and renovated.

== Equipment ==
=== Railway system ===
The railway system, situated adjacent to the central workshops and offices of the collieries, serves as the hub of a significant rail network. To facilitate rail transportation, the network required the construction of infrastructure such as a wooden bridge spanning the Rahin River to reach the Saint-Joseph coal mine, another metal bridge spanning the Beuvroux River to reach the Magny coal mine, and the digging of a 400-meter-long tunnel between 1905 and 1906 to serve the Arthur-de-Buyer coal mine.

A network of narrow-gauge railways (60 cm) connected the various shafts to the coal-processing centre. On these tracks, sedans are pulled by small steam locomotives, known as "lucettes," or by horses.

Other tracks with standard gauge railway link up with the Saint-Charles coal mine, which was first equipped with wide tracks before 1858. These tracks connect the station with the network outside the company. Two larger locomotives, named "Marie-Louise" and "Alsace-Lorraine," built in the Koechlin workshops, provide service on these lines.

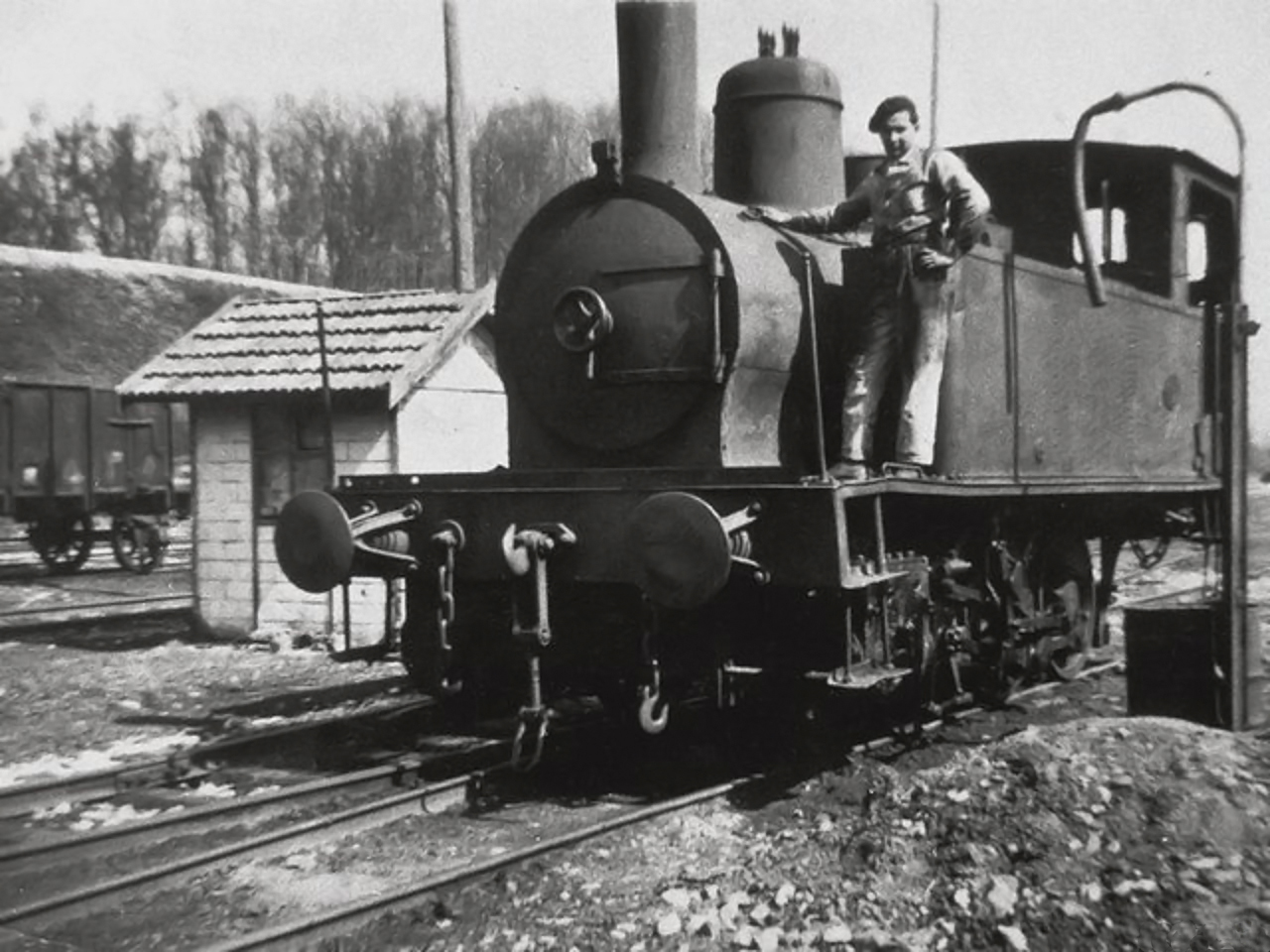
A Lucette at the coal station.

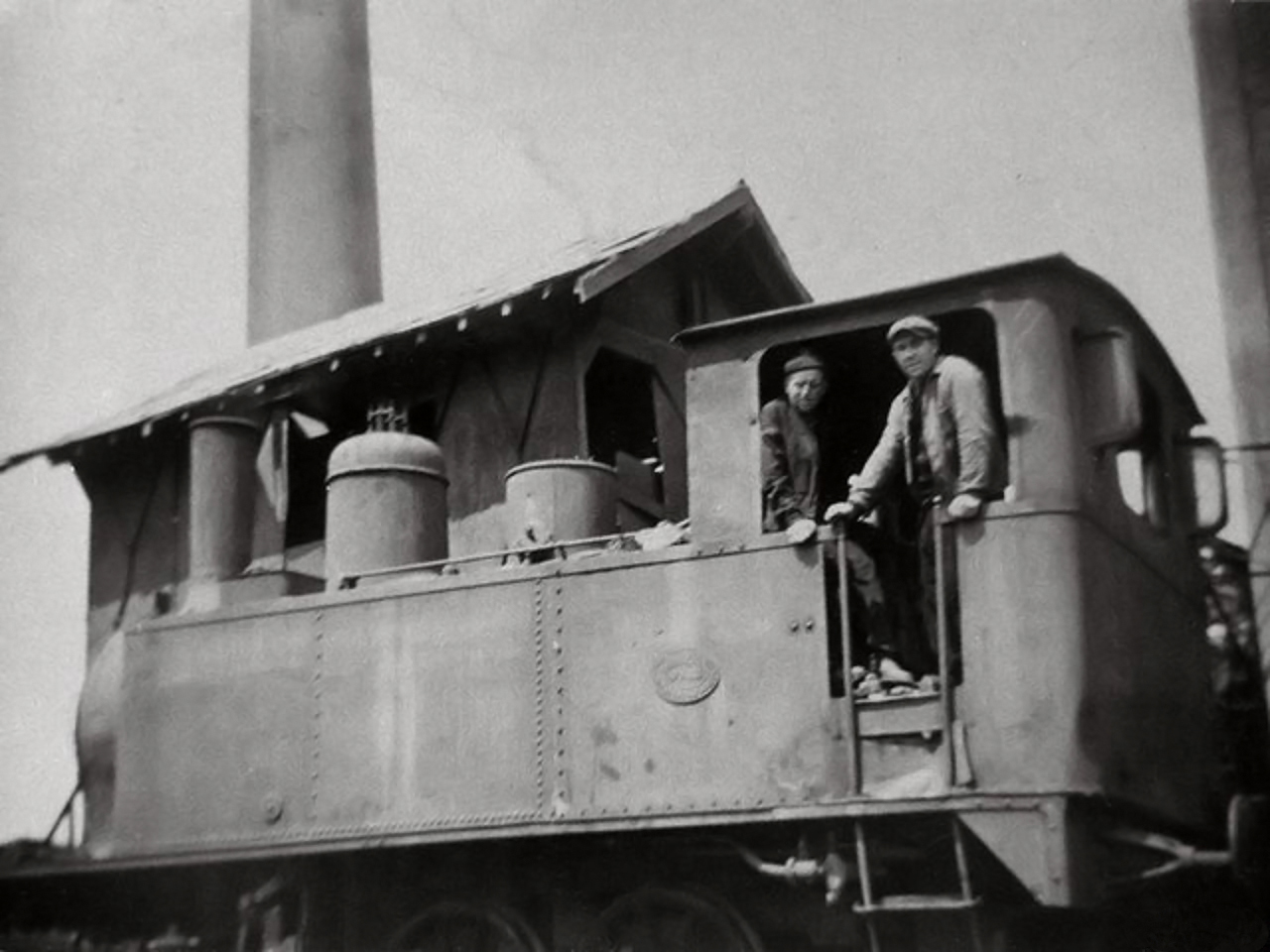
Another locomotive.

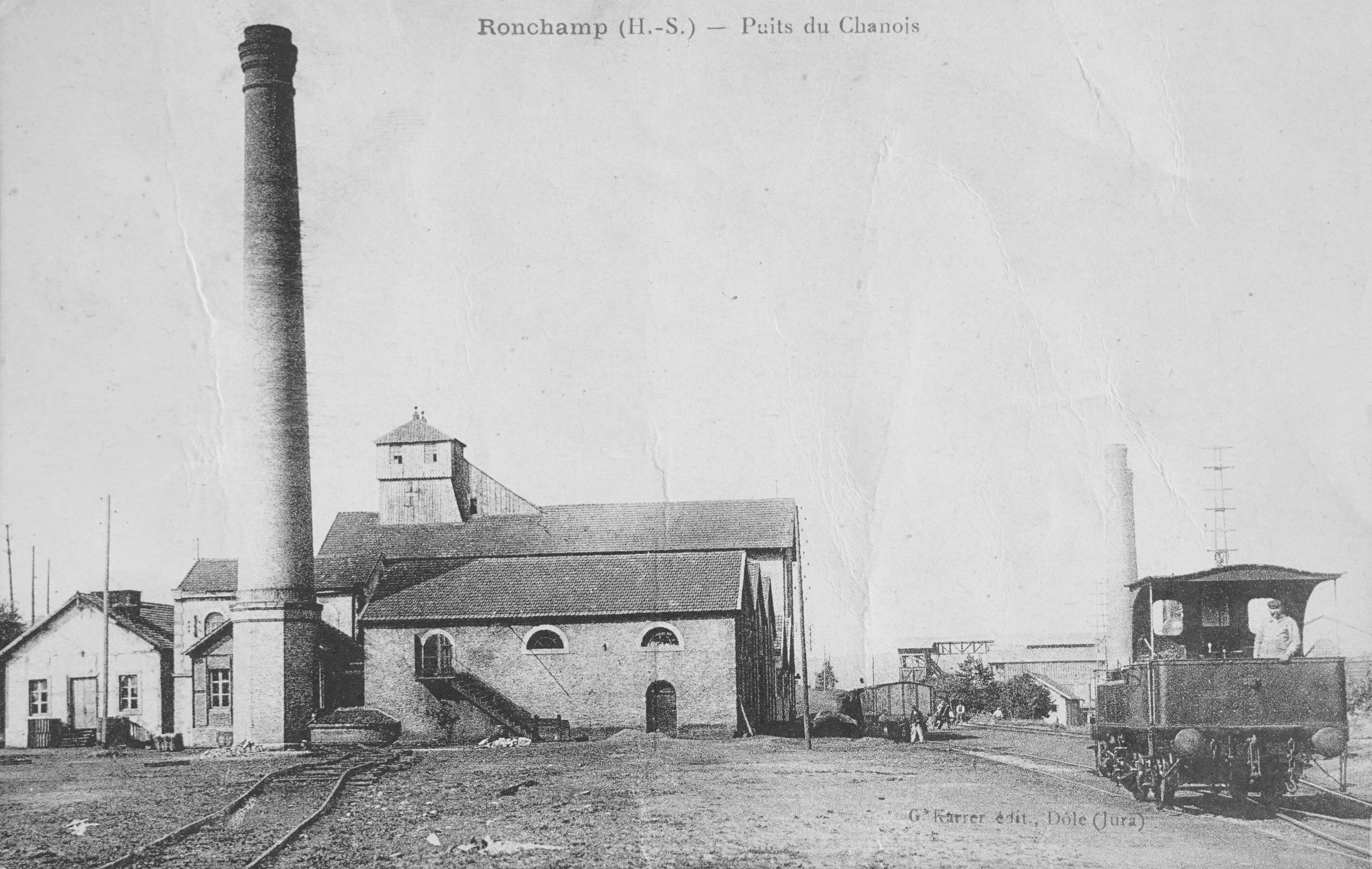
A Lucette at the Chanois shaft.

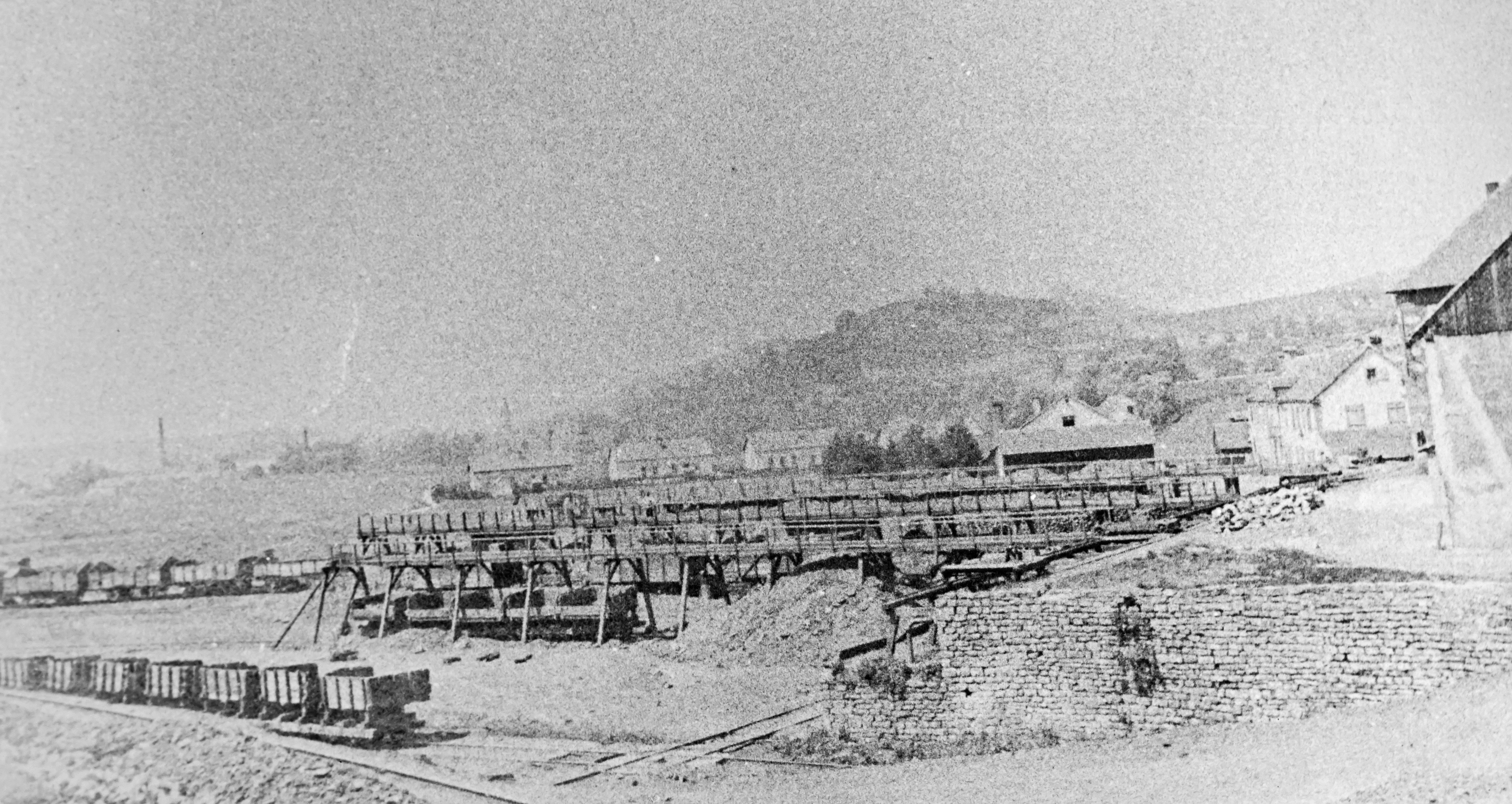
The loading of coal wagons at the exit of the Saint-Charles shaft.

A description of the various tracks is as follows:

- The western track, constructed in 1858, runs towards the center of Ronchamp. Each of the Saint-Charles and Saint-Joseph coal mines has its spur on the main axis. The railroad then diverged into two sections: one joining the Magny well and the other the Chanois coal mines and its annexes.
- The eastern track, known as the "new coal mines," was constructed in August 1861. It passes through the Sainte-Barbe coal mine and then crosses the present-day RD 619. The initial branch extends to the Sainte-Pauline coal mine, while the second, constructed in 1865 following the consolidation of the Ronchamp and Éboulet enterprises, serves the previously isolated Notre-Dame coal mine. The main section continues near to the Puits de l'Espérance and concludes at the Puits du Tonnet.
- A third track was constructed in 1888 between the Magny coal mine and the Chanois marshalling yard. It was subsequently extended between 1905 and 1906 to link up with the Arthur-de-Buyer coal mine. This track, like all those built after 1860, is only used by convoys of mine wagons. The track runs through a tunnel dug in the Chérimont sandstone in 1903.
- A branch line was constructed to transport ballast and aggregates mined from 1910 to 1950 by the Champagney ballastières.

Map of the coal mining system: Coal mining system (wide track) Coal mining system (narrow track) Coal mining system (tunnel) Vesoul to Plancher-les-Mines line (Chemins de fer vicinaux de la Haute-Saône) Paris-Est to Mulhouse-Ville line (Compagnie des chemins de fer de l'Est then SNCF)

=== Railway station ===
The layout consists of four tracks that run parallel to those of the Paris-Mulhouse line. A shed houses two locomotives and a small barrack used as offices. The station is situated a few hundred meters from the Saint-Charles coal mine, which was dug south of the hamlet of La Houillère. It is located opposite the workshops and administrative offices that serve as the company's nerve center.

The surroundings of the Saint-Charles shaft and station. Earthworks Mining buildings Mining town Coal mining system Vesoul to Plancher-les-Mines line (Chemins de fer vicinaux de la Haute-Saône) Paris-Est to Mulhouse-Ville line (Compagnie des chemins de fer de l'Est, then SNCF)

=== Connection with the Paris-Est line at Mulhouse-Ville ===
Once the fuel has been processed at the Chanois coal mine, the contents of the mining wagons are transferred to line-haul wagons. The coal station is accessible via a special spur located at kilometer point (PK) 422.5 on the Paris-Est to Mulhouse-Ville line, 1.4 km east of the Ronchamp station. Coal can be transferred to the Haute-Saône local railroad network at the Champagney station.

== Staff ==
The staff employed on the various installations includes mechanics, drivers, maintenance workers, and gatekeepers. Gatekeepers are typically former miners who have been disabled by a mine accident. The safety regulations require that a single mechanic be able to perform all the maneuvers (signalman, flagman, etc.).

== Vestiges ==
At the beginning of the 21st century, several vestiges of these installations remain, including embankments, trenches, sections of track, and buffer stop. The office building was converted to residential use and still exists.

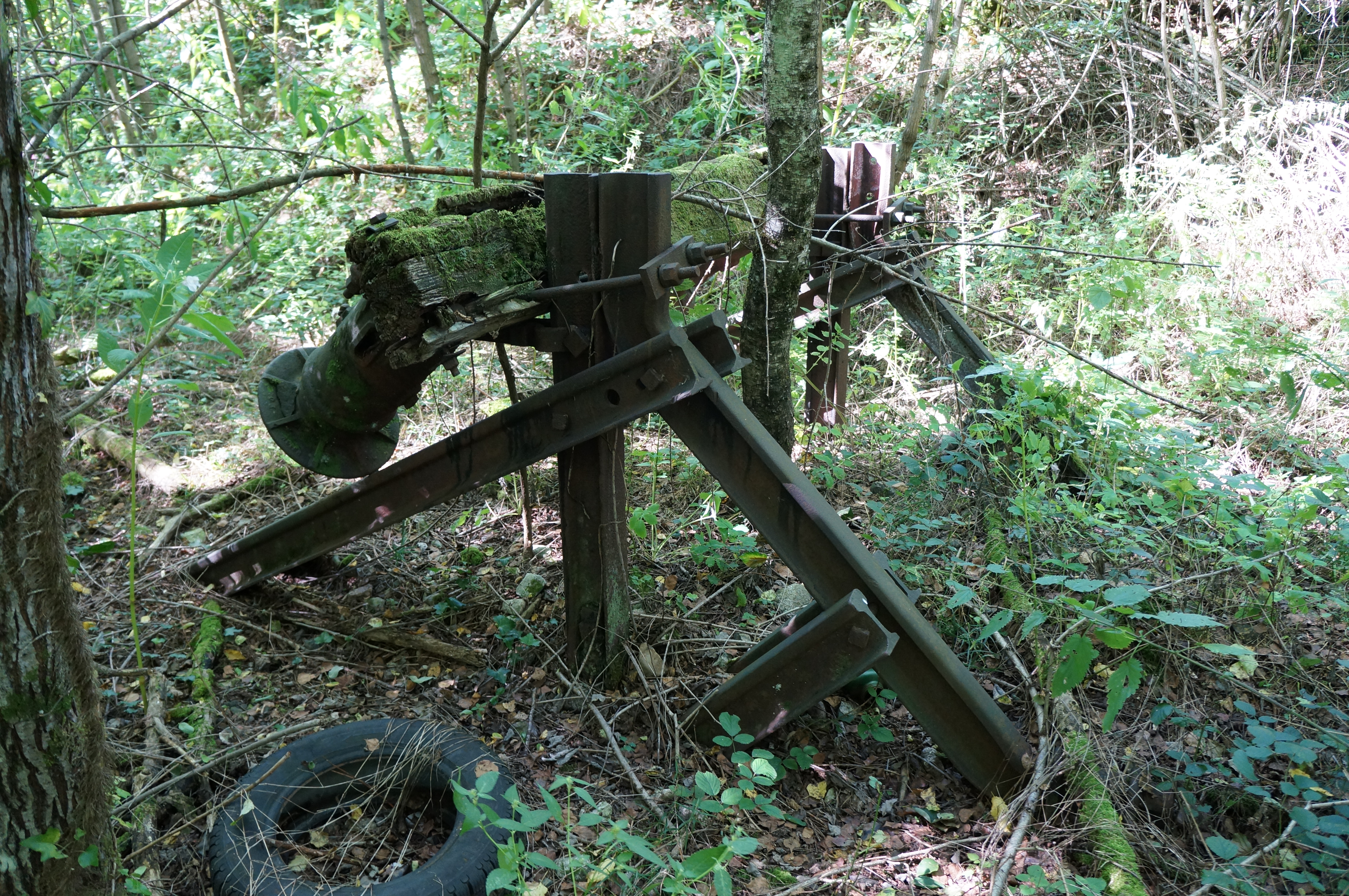
A buffer stop

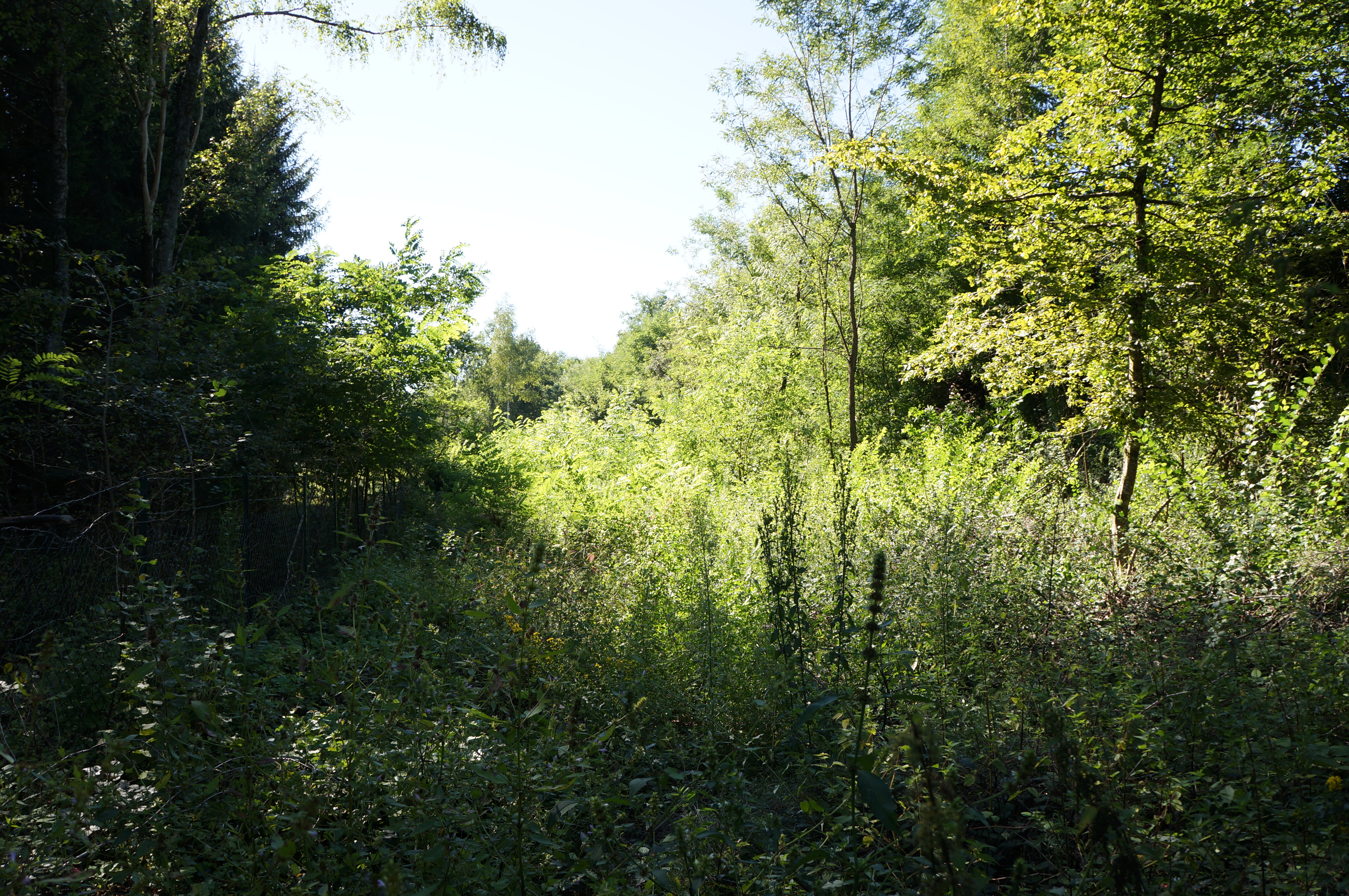
The station site overgrown.

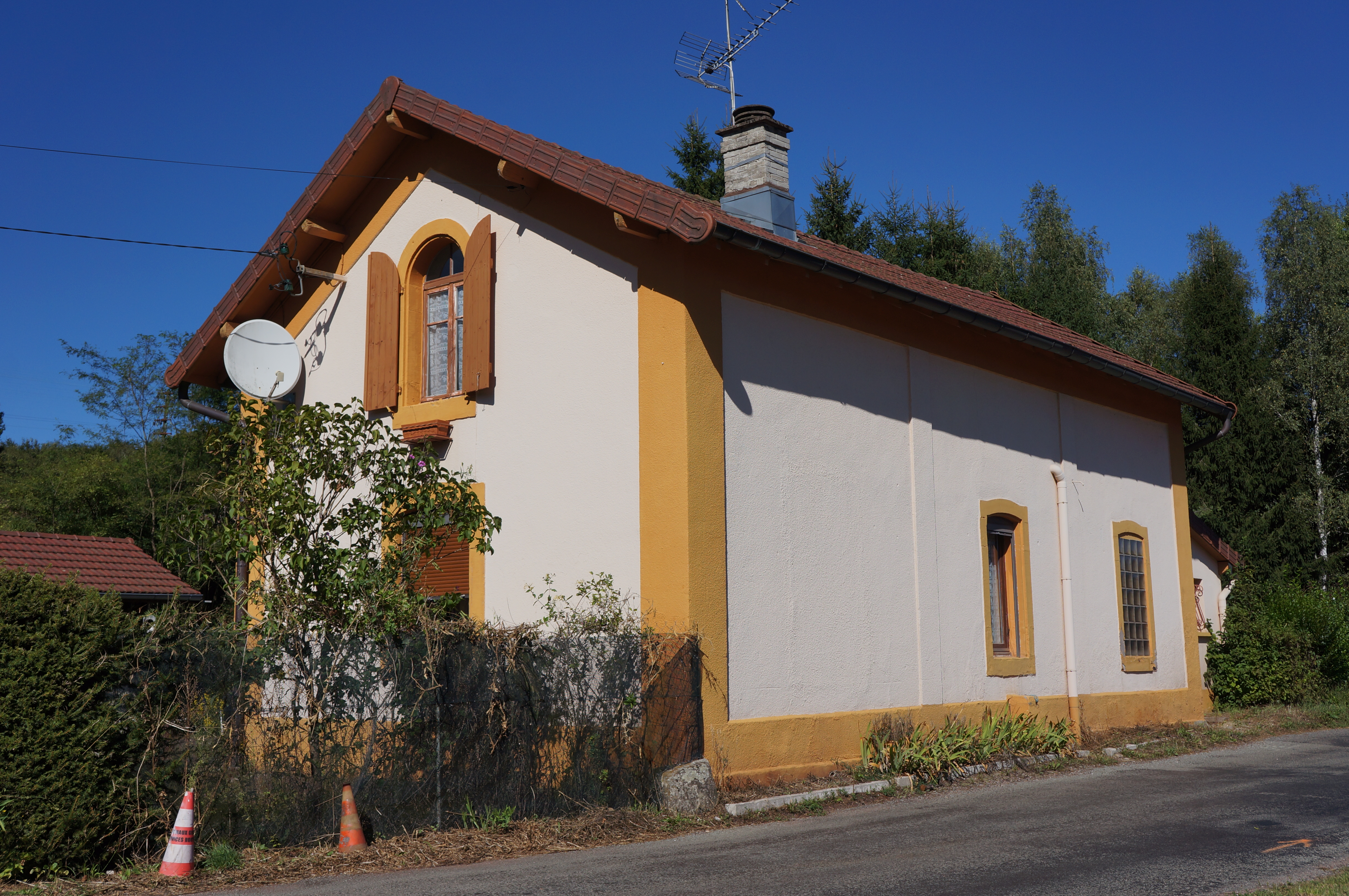
Office building converted to residential use.

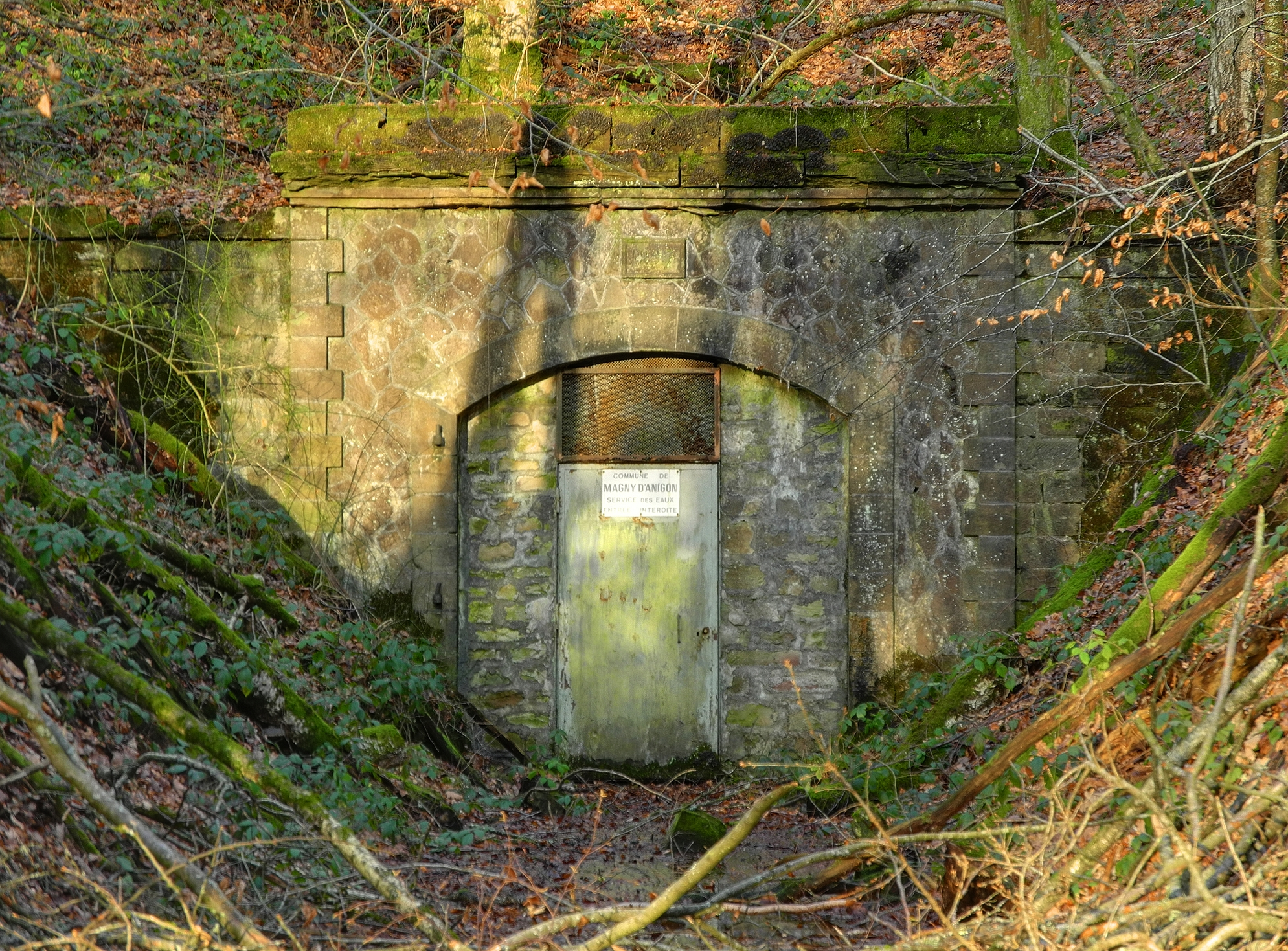
Entrance to the Arthur-de-Buyer shaft tunnel.

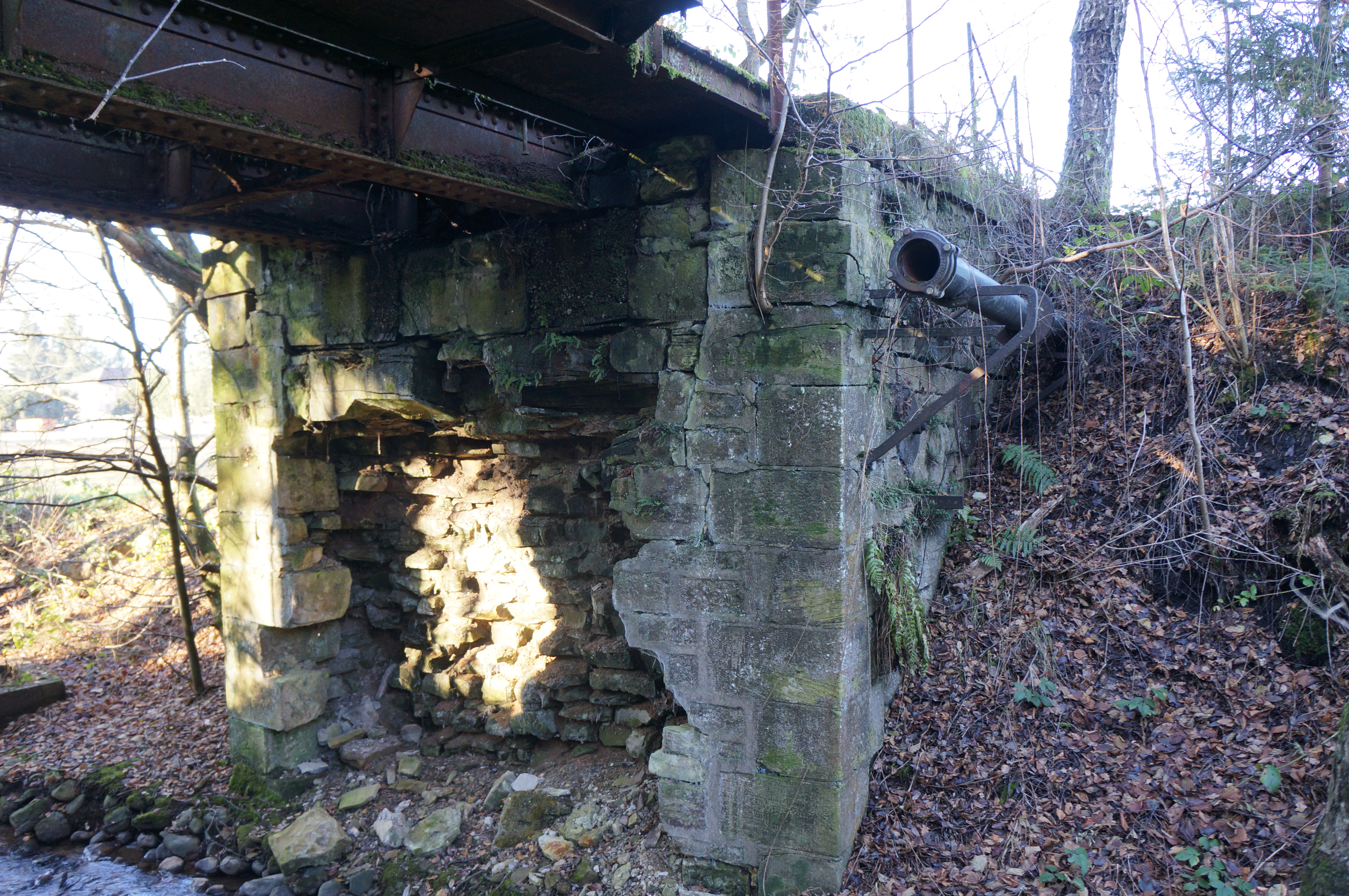
Beuveroux bridge, near the Magny coal mine.

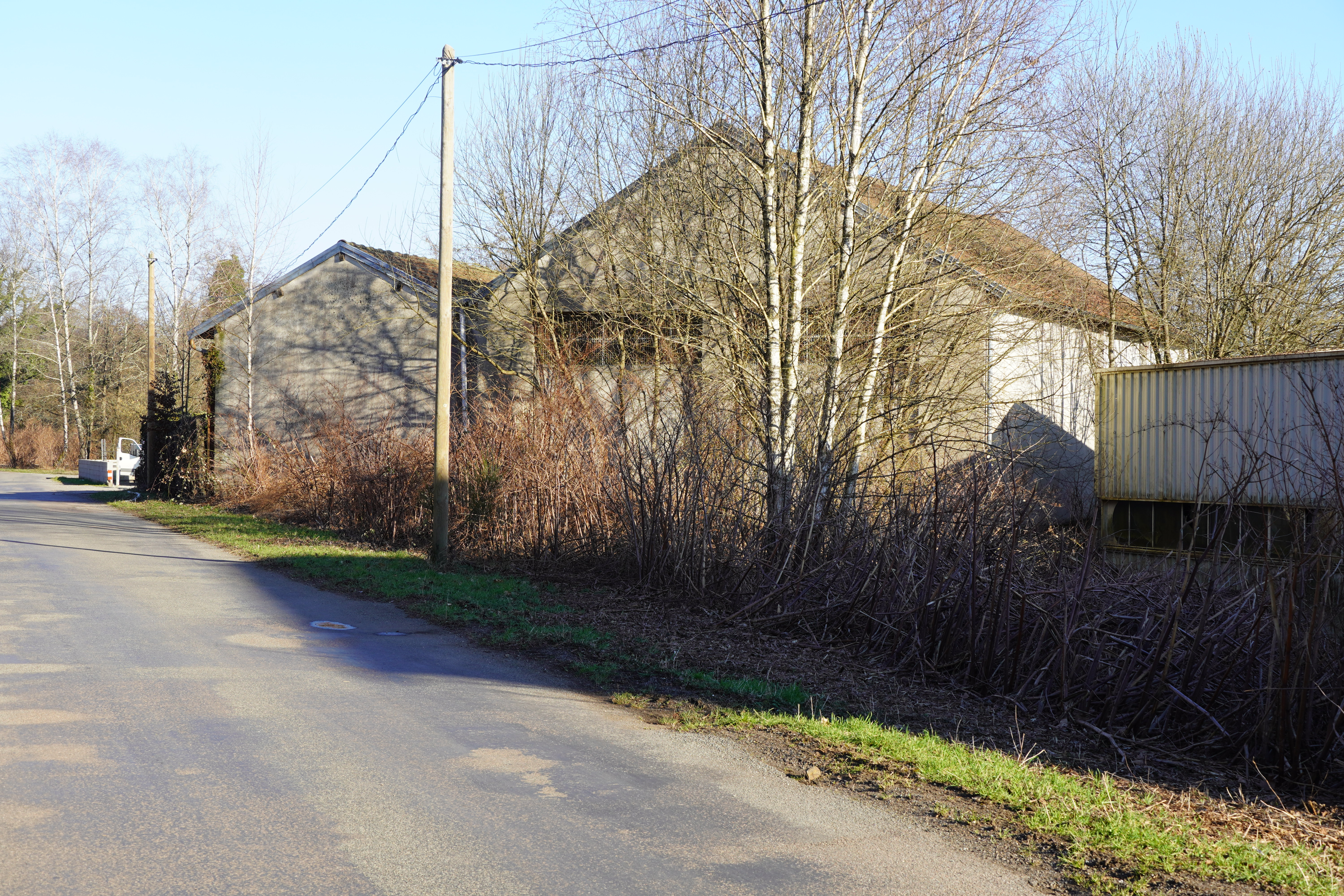
Old locomotive shed.

== Bibliography ==
- Parietti, Jean-Jacques (2010). Les Houillères de Ronchamp - Tome 2 : Les mineurs (in French). Fc culture & patrimoine. ISBN 978-2362300011.
- Parietti, Jean-Jacques (1999). Les dossiers de la Houillère 3 : Le puits Saint Charles (in French). Association des amis du musée de la mine.
- PNRBV (1999). Le charbon de Ronchamp (in French). Déchiffrer le patrimoine - Parc naturel régional des Ballons des Vosges. ISBN 2-910328-31-7.
- Société de l'industrie minérale (1875). Bulletin trimestriel.
- Parietti, Jean-Jacques (2001). Les Houillères de Ronchamp vol. I : La mine (in French). Éditions Comtoises. ISBN 2-914425-08-2.

== Related articles ==
- Ronchamp coal mines
- List of SNCF stations in Bourgogne-Franche-Comté
- Paris-Est–Mulhouse-Ville railway
