= Sainte-Barbe Coal Mine =

Coal mine in Champagney, France

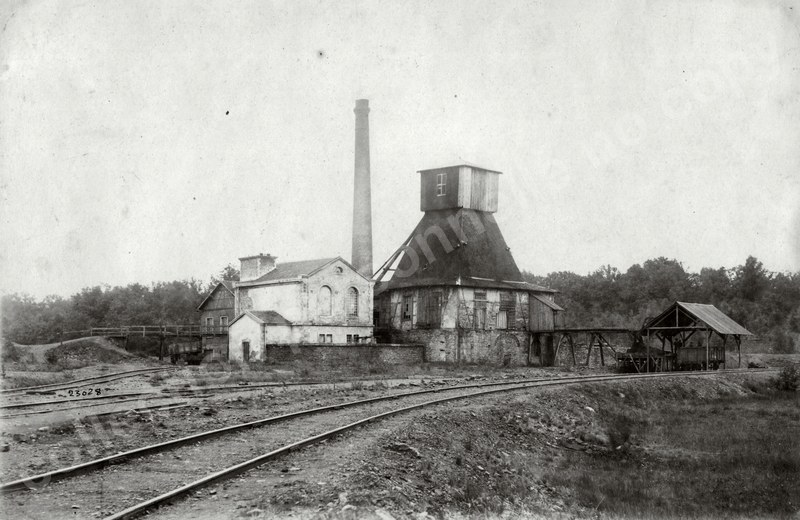
- The shaft prior to its closure circa 1884.

- Location within Bourgogne-Franche-Comté
- Location: Champagney commune, Haute-Saône department, Bourgogne-Franche-Comté region,France; 47°41′54″N 06°39′30″E
- Products: Coal
- Type: Coal mine
- Greatest depth: 324 m (1,063 ft)
- Discovered: 1854
- Opened: June 1st,1854
- Active: 1860 - 1872
- Closed: 1872 (extraction) 1884 (ventilation)
- Company: Ronchamp coal mines

The Sainte-Barbe Coal Mine is a former shaft of the Ronchamp coal mines located near the Champagney ballast pits (Haute-Saône department), in eastern France. The shaft was excavated in 1854, and mined for coal from 1860 to 1872. It was used to ventilate the Sainte-Pauline shaft from 1869 to 1884, before being backfilled. Its longevity and productivity were less than those of the company's main extraction shafts.

In the second half of the 20th century, the site was used as a sand pit. A short-lived equestrian center existed at the beginning of the 21st century. An explanatory panel installed in 2017 tells the story of the Sainte-Pauline and Sainte-Barbe shafts.

== Excavation ==
Digging of the shaft began on 1 June 1854, 835 metres from the Saint-Charles shaft, with a section measuring 5.1 metres by 2.5 metres. By September 1856, it had reached a depth of 93.60 metres. The water was drained (20 m3 per hour) using a ten-horsepower steam engine consisting of a horizontal cylinder and gears. This engine was used to drive the pumps and raise the skips of excavated material, while a horse-drawn engine was used to lower the equipment and carry out various manoeuvres. A casing was installed in the rectangular section. At 25.70 metres, the shaft was circular in cross-section and 3.20 metres in diameter. In September 1856, a 12-horsepower direct-drive steam engine accompanied by pumps was ordered from Le Creusot for dewatering; this equipment was operational in June 1857 and sinking resumed. The dewatering machine operated at a rate of seven or eight strokes per minute, but was capable of twelve strokes per minute if necessary. The water was pumped up through sheet metal pipes 24 centimetres in diameter.

In May 1858, the installation of the dodecagonal casing, made up of sides 94 centimetres wide and a total height of 98.50 metres, was completed. However, the casing was fragile and eventually began to leak, so a small pump driven by a four-horsepower steam engine was installed 104 metres above the surface in June 1873. It collected between 100 and 120 m^{3} of water a day in a cofferdam.

== Exploitation ==
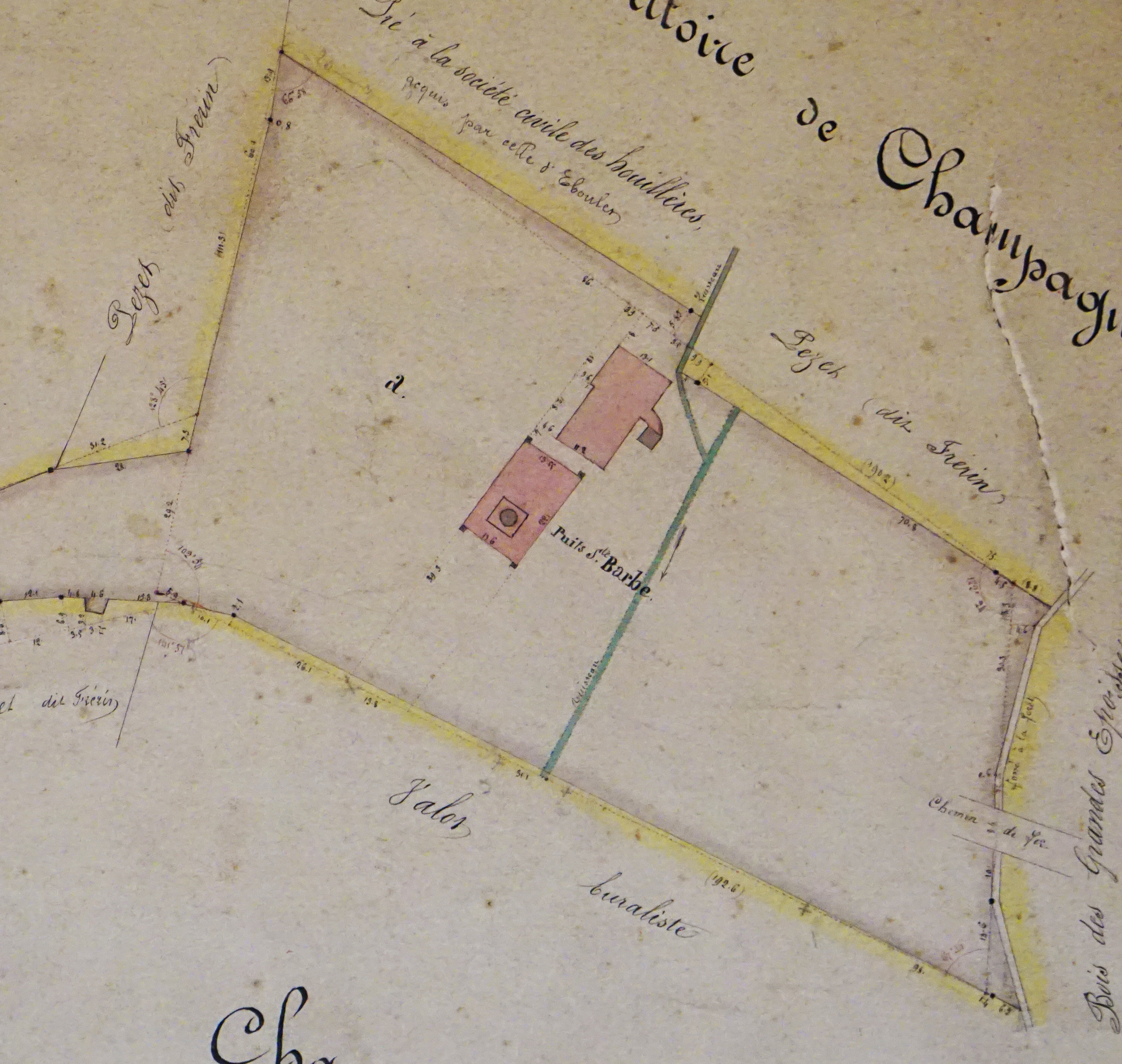
Plan of the installations before the construction of the Lemielle ventilator.

On 1 June 1860, at a depth of 249 meters, the Sainte-Barbe shaft encountered the first layer of coal, 1.66 meters thick, which almost lay on the transitional ground. A connecting cave system was created with the Saint-Charles shaft for ventilation, and cross-connections were drilled with the Sainte-Pauline and Saint-Joseph shafts. Ventilation was provided by the fan installed in Shaft No. 7.

The 60 hp motor driving the winding engine came from the cleat machine at Saint-Charles, and drove the coils via gears. In August 1861, a railway line known as the "new shafts" was built, linking the shaft to the colliery railway network. Coal production reached 26,292.5 tonnes in 1861 and 8,000 tonnes in 1863.

In 1863, the shaft was deepened to create a cross-bank. Annual production was around 20,000 to 24,000 tonnes of coal. But the shaft encountered a deposit of poor quality, limited to the north and east by uplift, and to the west and south by the workings of the Saint-Charles and Saint-Joseph shafts. Finally, large reserves were discovered in the second layer, although the quality of the coal was mediocre. Mining ceased at the Sainte-Barbe shaft in September 1872.

== Ventilation ==
In order to prevent overloading the ventilator at Shaft No. 7, a Lemielle ventilator was commissioned at the Sainte-Barbe shaft in June 1869. This ventilator provided a flow rate of 12 m^{3}/s, which was sufficient for the works at Sainte-Pauline, which were not extensive and did not contain much gravel. The Sainte-Barbe shaft was used as an air outlet, and its opening was closed by mobile flaps that were raised by the extraction cages when they reached the surface revenue. After extraction ceased in 1872, the shaft remained open to ventilate the Sainte-Pauline works.

The shaft closed in 1884 at the same time as its neighbor (Sainte-Pauline), and was backfilled with shale.

== Vestiges ==
At the beginning of the 21st century, the well was located in a clearing near the Champagney ballastières, on the edge of the Bois des Époisses. An equestrian center opened there around 2010 before closing in October 2014.

The route of the old railway line is a path running through the Bois des Époisses. This path is part of the wood's fitness trail. A sign explaining the history of the Sainte-Pauline and Sainte-Barbe wells was installed at the start of the trail in the autumn of 2017.

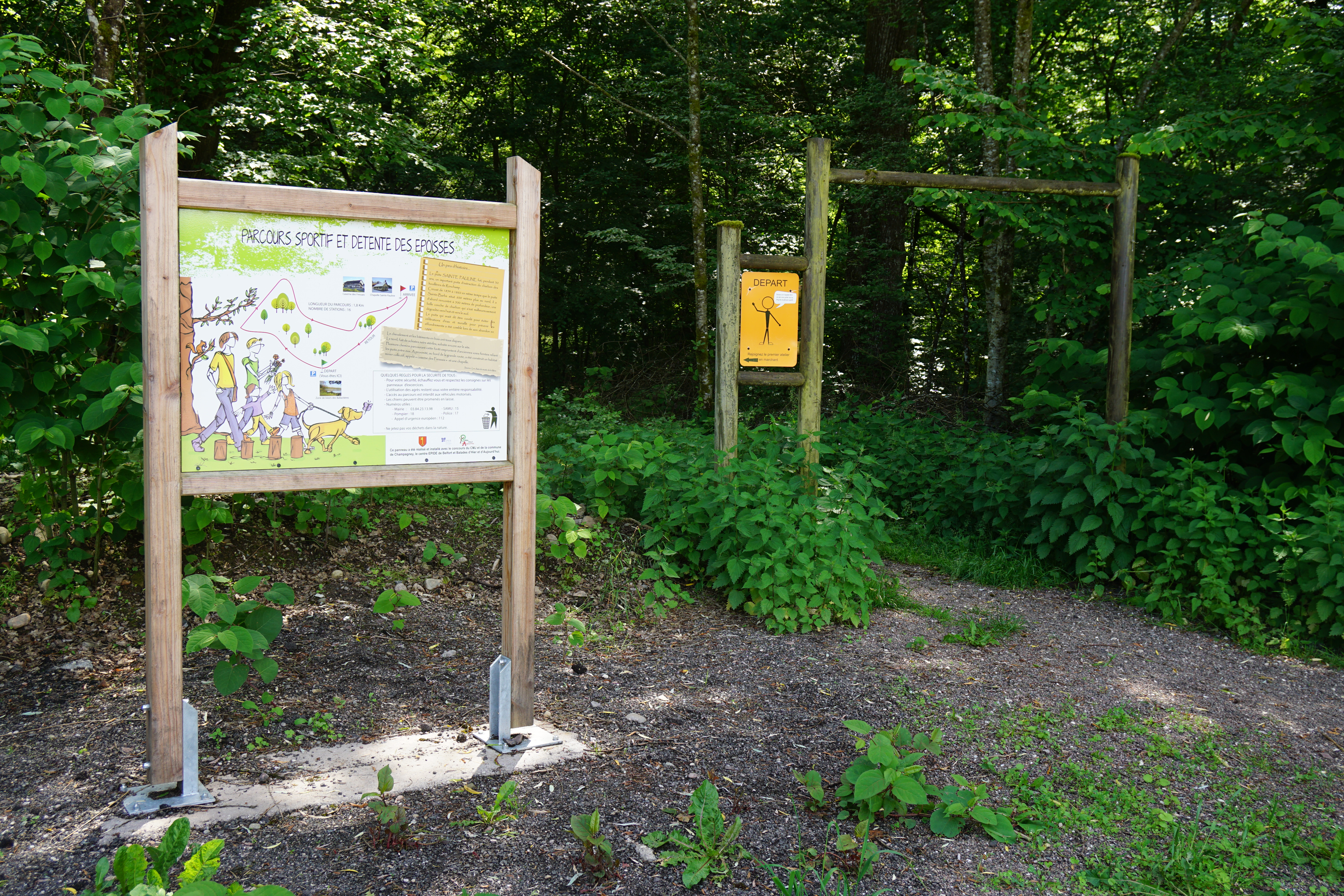
A sign for the shaft at the entrance to the fitness trail.

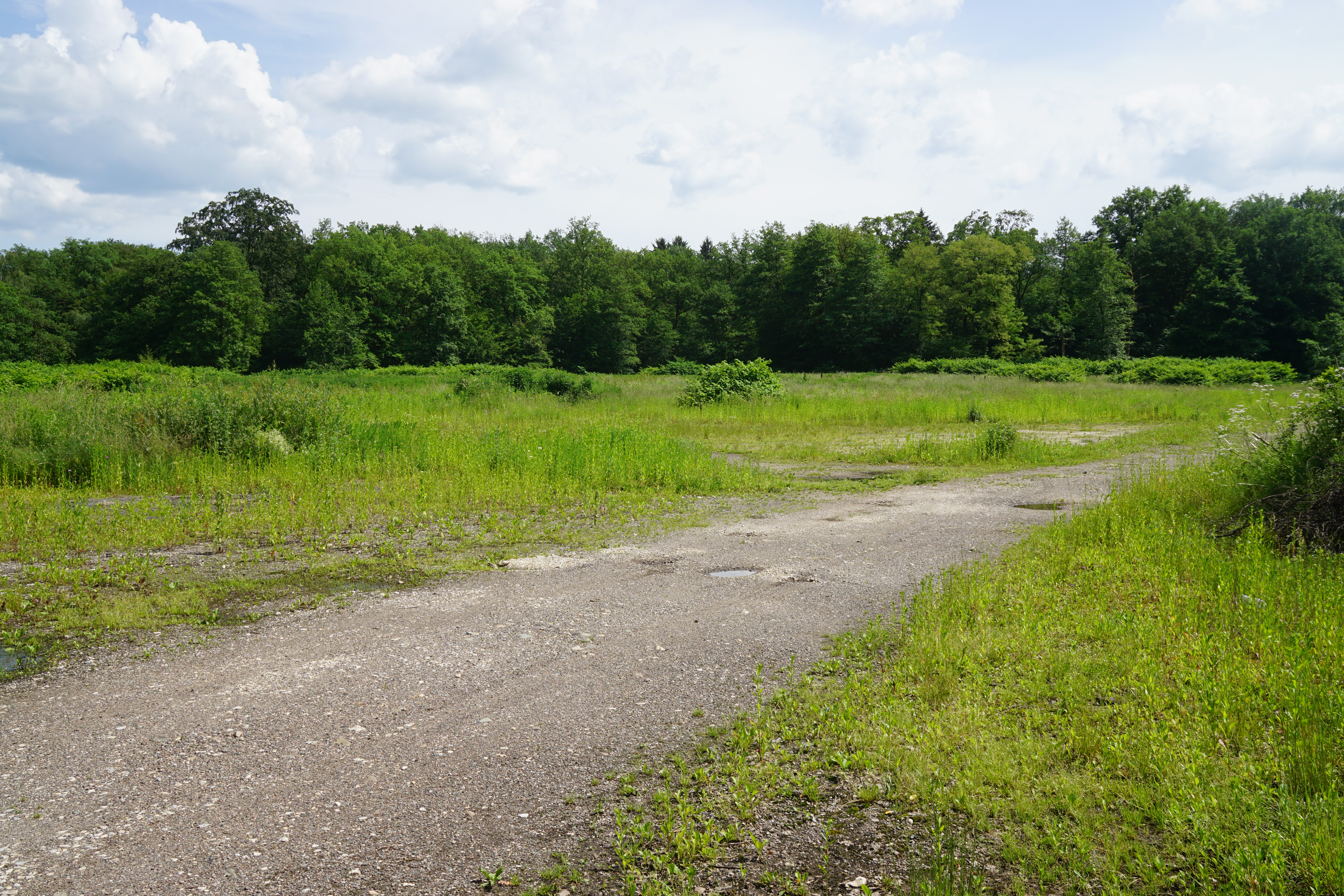
Overview of the well site (similar to the 1884 photo).

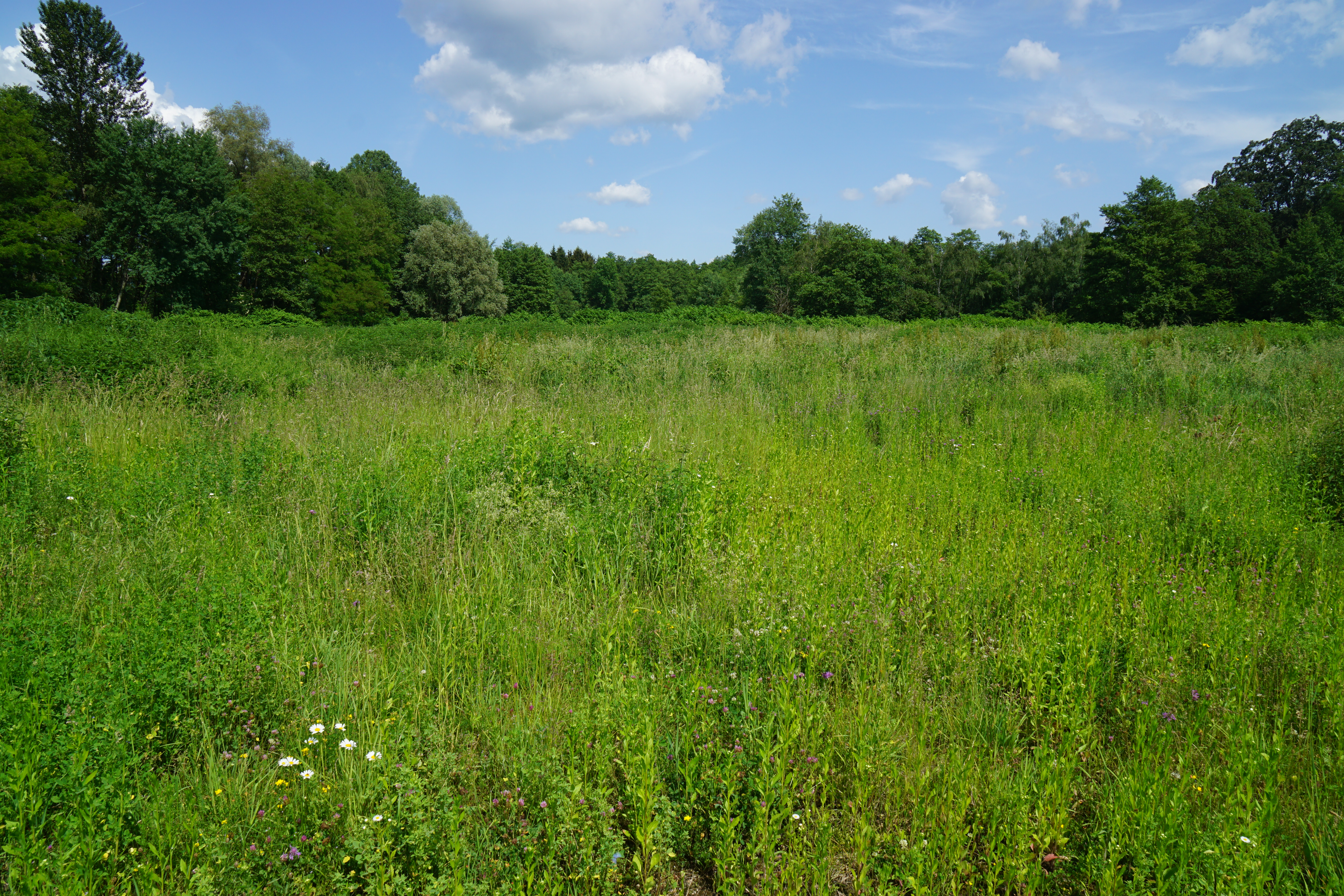
Location of the Sainte-Barbe coal mine.

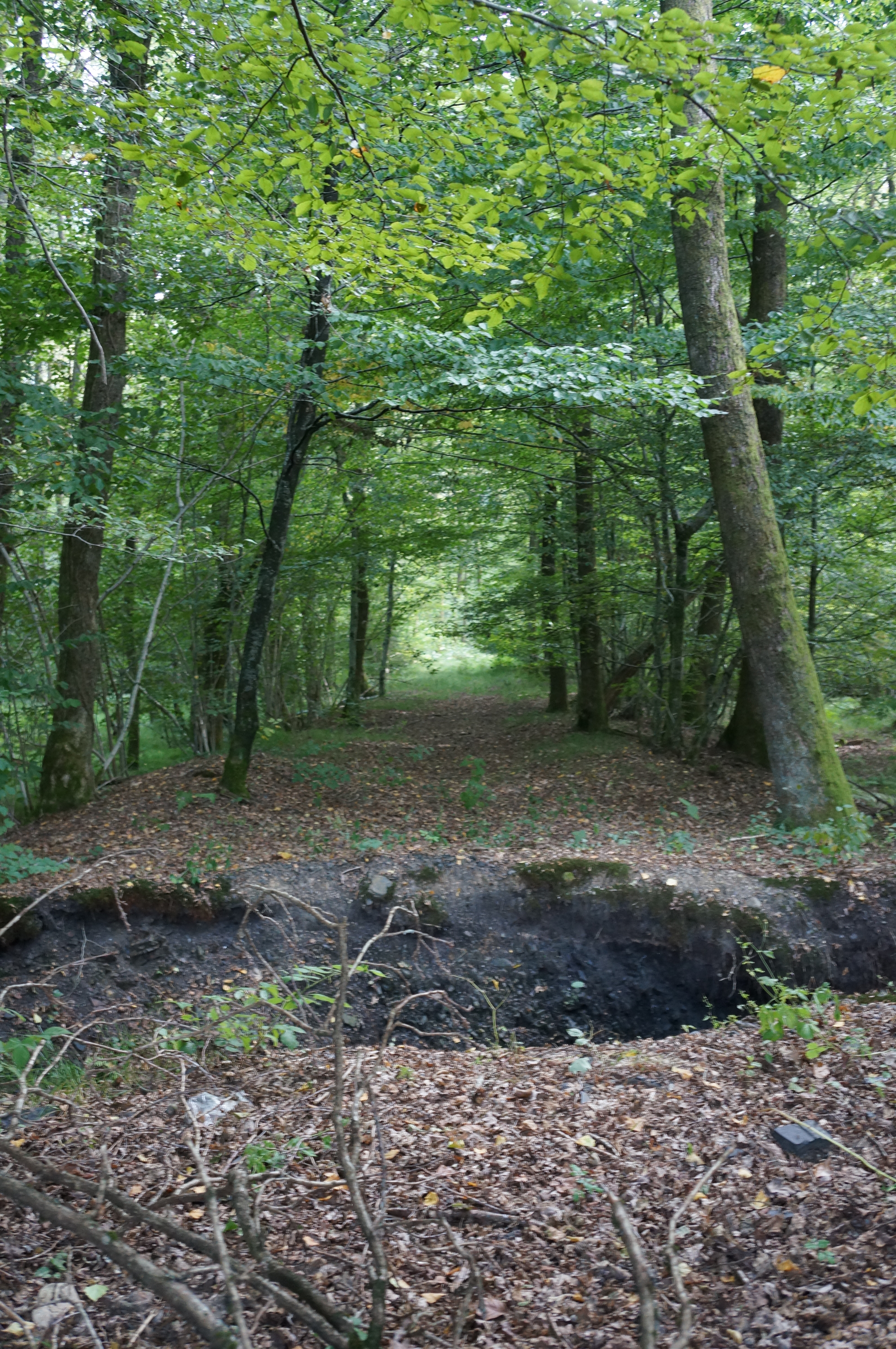
The old railway line.

== Terrils ==
A flat slag heap formed around the shaft. After the well was abandoned, the slag heap was gradually overgrown by woodland, before a sand pit was built between the late 1960s and early 1990s, which radically altered and leveled the site. At the beginning of the 21st century, it was used for pasture.

== See also ==
=== External links ===
- ^{(fr)} "Les puits creusés dans le bassin de Ronchamp" archive, on "Les Amis du musée de la mine".

=== Bibliography ===
- ^{(fr)} Michel Godard, Enjeux et impacts de l'exploitation minière du bassin houiller de Romchamp (1810-1870), UTBM, 16 May 2012 (read online archive).
- ^{(fr)} François Mathet, Mémoire sur les mines de Ronchamp, Société de l'industrie minérale, 1882 (read online.
- ^{(fr)} Jean-Jacques Parietti, Les Houillères de Ronchamp, vol. I : La mine, Vesoul, Éditions Comtoises, 2001, 87 p. (ISBN 2-914425-08-2)
- ^{(fr)} Jean-Jacques Parietti, Les Houillères de Ronchamp, vol. II : Les mineurs, Noidans-lès-Vesoul, fc culture & patrimoine, 2010, 115 p. (ISBN 978-2-36230-001-1)
- ^{(fr)} Société de l'industrie minérale, Bulletin trimestriel, Saint-Étienne, 1882 (read online archive).
- ^{(fr)} Édouard Thirria, Manuel à l'usage de l'habitant du département de la Haute-Saône, 1869 (read online archive), p. 182-186.
