= Saint-Charles shaft =

French coal mine shaft

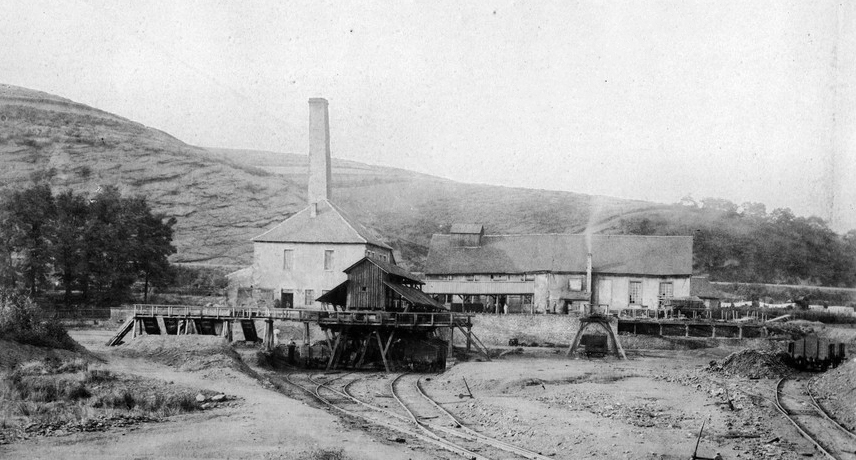
- surface installations
- Location: Bourgogne-Franche-Comté, France
- Type: shaft
- Opened: September 14, 1845
- Active: August 19, 1847

The Saint-Charles shaft (or No. 8 shaft) is one of the main collieries of the Ronchamp coal mine. It is located in Ronchamp, Haute-Saône, in eastern France. In the second half of the nineteenth century, this shaft made it possible to mine large coal seams, contributing to the company's golden age.

Saint-Charles has been open for over fifty years, a long life compared to other open shafts in the Ronchamp mining basin. It has also experienced mining disasters such as fires and firedamp blasts. The shaft is distinguished by its revolutionary extraction system using a cleat machine. The process, too complex, was eventually abandoned following technical setbacks.

After closure, the pit buildings were converted into housing; the slag heaps were re-used between the wars, as they were still rich in coal. At the end of the twentieth century, these same slag heaps, which had become a dumping ground for a nearby factory, burst into flames, frightening the local population.

== Situation before sinking ==
After the Saint-Louis shaft was sunk in the hamlet of La Houillère in 1810, the company dug a series of shafts close to the outcrops, varying in depth from 19 to 165 meters. But the last shafts dug around 1830, found no coal. Shaft no. 5, continued by drilling, found no trace of coal, and shaft no. 6 stumbled on an uplift in the coalfield linked to a fault. In 1839, shaft no. 7 was sunk in search of coal. However, with the company bankrupt, the concession was put up for sale and the sinking stopped.

In 1843, Charles Demandre and Joseph Bezanson bought the Ronchamp concession and continued sinking shaft no. 7. They finally found coal at 205 meters, behind the uplift. Shortly after the No. 7 shaft was commissioned, borehole X was drilled on the Champagney plain, uncovering significant coal seams. On August 28, 1845, a prefectoral decree authorized the digging of shaft no. 8.

== Sinking ==
The “under stot” sinking method.

Sinking of the shaft began on September 11, 1845, with a rectangular cross-section measuring 4.64 meters × 2.14 meters; the extraction chamber measures 1.70 meters × 1.76 meters. By the end of 1846, it had reached a depth of 180 meters. A 60-hp steam engine was installed. On August 19, 1847, at a depth of 225.80 meters, the first layer was encountered, with a thickness of 2.50 meters of pure coal.

To exploit the first layer immediately, the company uses the “sous stot” digging technique: a second shaft is dug parallel to the main shaft from the first layer. Once the intermediate layer has been reached, a gallery is dug under the main shaft and continues to the second layer. When both sections are completed, a junction is made. Digging lasted from September 1847 to April 1848.

== Operation ==
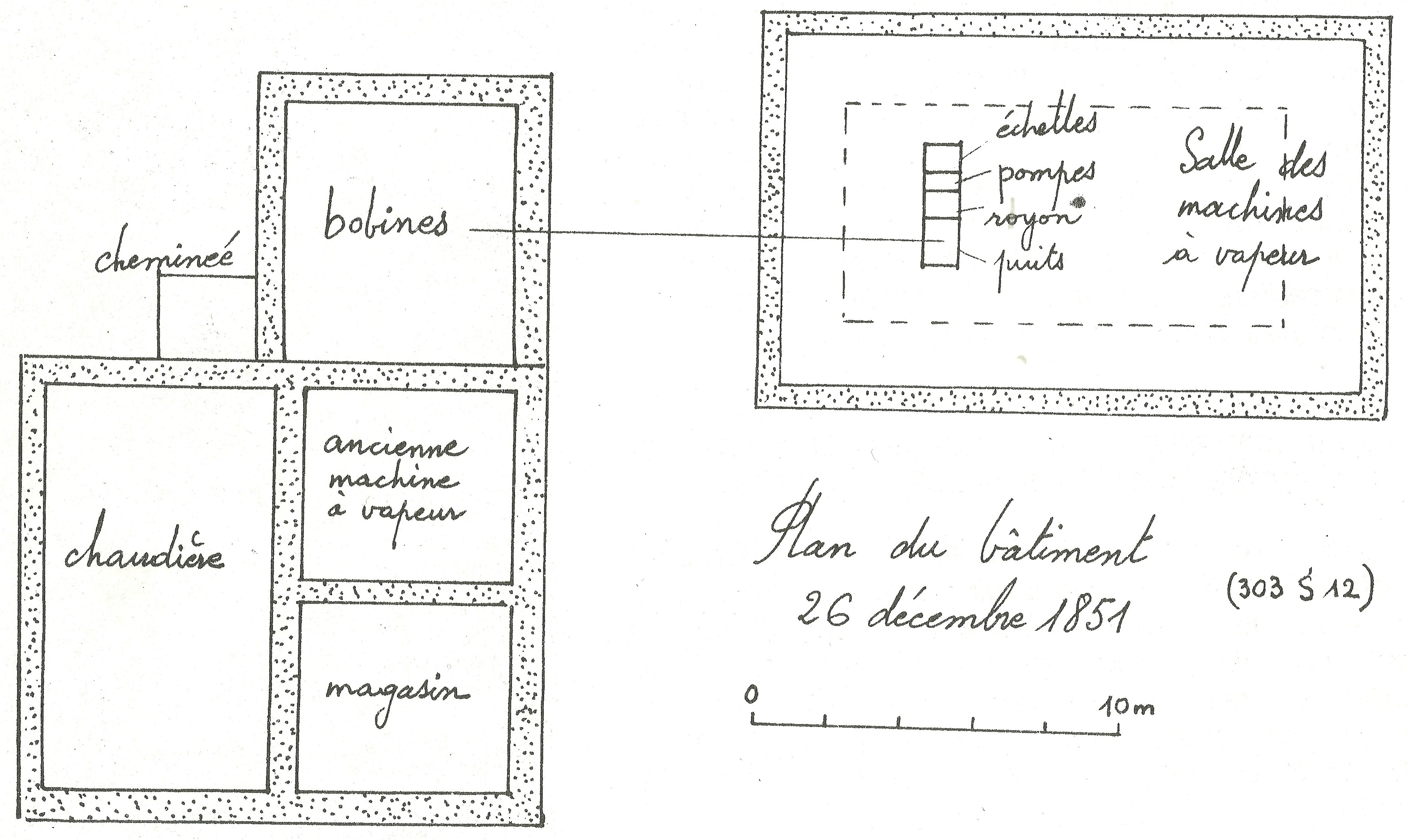
Plan of Saint-Charles well facilities.

In 1848, a steam engine consisting of a single vertical cylinder with a diameter of 49 centimeters and a stroke of 1.356 meters was installed. This was a Meyer machine manufactured in the Expansion workshops, with a flywheel six meters in diameter. The extraction machine's pendulum is supported by two cast-iron columns, and vertical guides frame the piston. The manual braking system was replaced by a steam brake. The machine is rated at 60 hp6. The extraction compartment has only two guides, and the cages slide on either side of them. The cages can only hold one 315-kg carriage. Rolling is carried out by wheelbarrow in the galleries and with carts on cast-iron or wooden rails. In the same year, (Note: Jacking” involves digging a mine shaft from the surface. By extension, any excavation of a steeply inclined structure can be described as jacking. This includes not only the excavation, but also the removal of spoil and the initial lining.) a large 700-metre-long inclined plane was built to follow the coal bed.

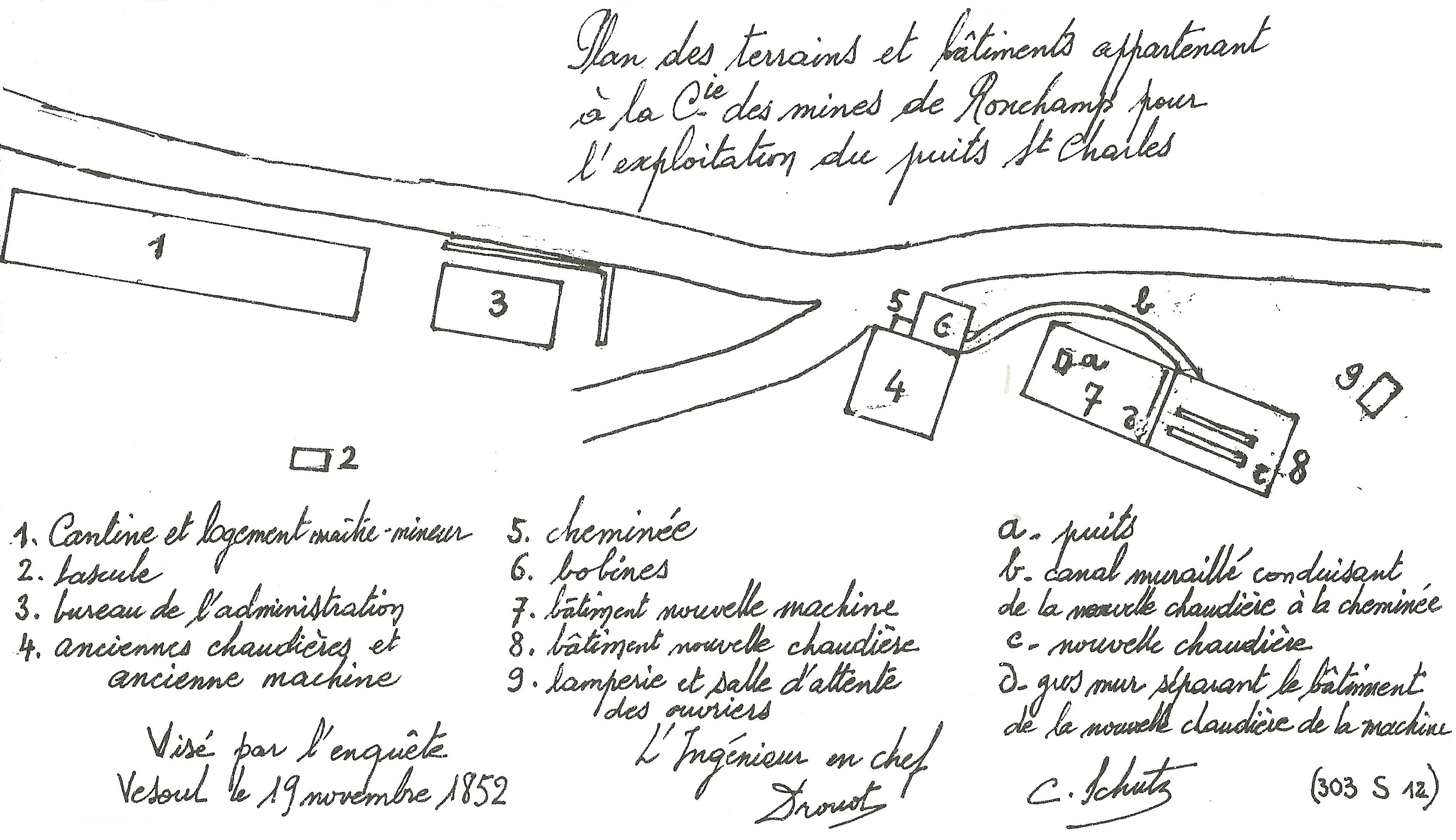
Floor plan of the Saint-Charles: canteen and porter's quarters; weighbridge; administration; old boilers and machine; large chimney; coils; new machine; and c. boilers added during expansions; lamp house; well; smoke channel; thick dividing wall.

In 1850, 57,413 tonnes of coal were extracted from the bowels of the Saint-Charles shaft. The latter exploited some of the most important veins in the Ronchamp coalfields, including a four-metre-thick layer in 1862 and a three-metre-thick layer discovered four years later. In June 1861, the Saint-Charles pit continued to operate without interruption, extracting 2,585 tonnes of coal. However, this was no longer the most productive pit, as the Saint-Joseph pit extracted 6,258 tonnes and the Sainte-Barbe pit 2,622 tonnes in the same month. Production amounted to 24,292. tons in 1861, 30,205.7 tons in 1862 and 67,036 tons in 1863.

In 1868, the most important part of the second layer was mined and production reached 100 tonnes per day. At the same time, the link with the Sainte-Marie shaft was completed, facilitating ventilation. By 1873, all mining at the Saint-Charles shaft was taking place in the second layer on floors 260 and 315, and consideration was being given to mining the intermediate layer (located between the first and second layers). Three years later, in January, 2,610 tonnes of coal, 550 cubic metres of water and 673 tonnes of spoil were brought up from the shaft. In 1877, a telephone was installed to communicate with the bottom of the shaft.

== The cleat machine ==
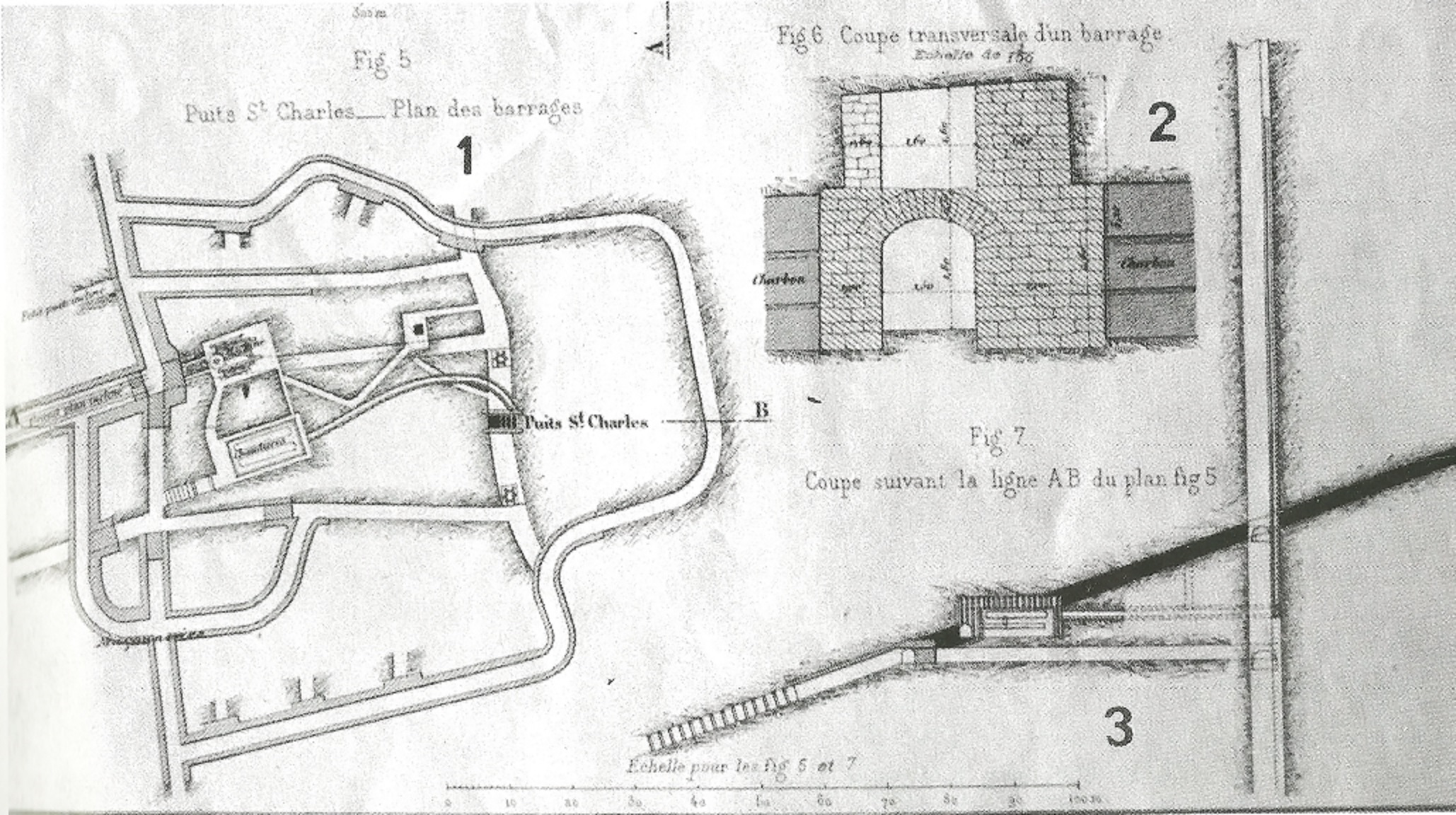
Plans of the bottom of the shaft. 1: ground plan of the galleries, 2: plan of the brick dams, 3: cross-section of the shaft.

By 1849, operations at the Saint-Charles shaft gradually expanded to the south, east, and west. The company considered sinking another well (the Saint-Joseph well, which would be sunk the following year), but sinking a well can take five to six years, and the company needed immediate resources. It therefore decided to sink an inclined plane at the same time as the Saint-Joseph shaft, to reach the area to be mined more quickly. The breakthrough of this descending gallery began in December 1849. It was initially equipped with a horse-drawn carousel, but this system was not sufficiently efficient, so the engineers thought of a new mining system: the cleat machine.

A cleat machine has already been installed at the bottom of Compagnie des Mines d'Anzin's Davy pit in La Sentinelle, in the Nord-Pas-de-Calais coalfield, and the collieries have decided to use the same system at Ronchamp. Initially, a single circuit is to start from the Saint-Joseph shaft, then follow the inclined plane before climbing back up through the Saint-Charles shaft.

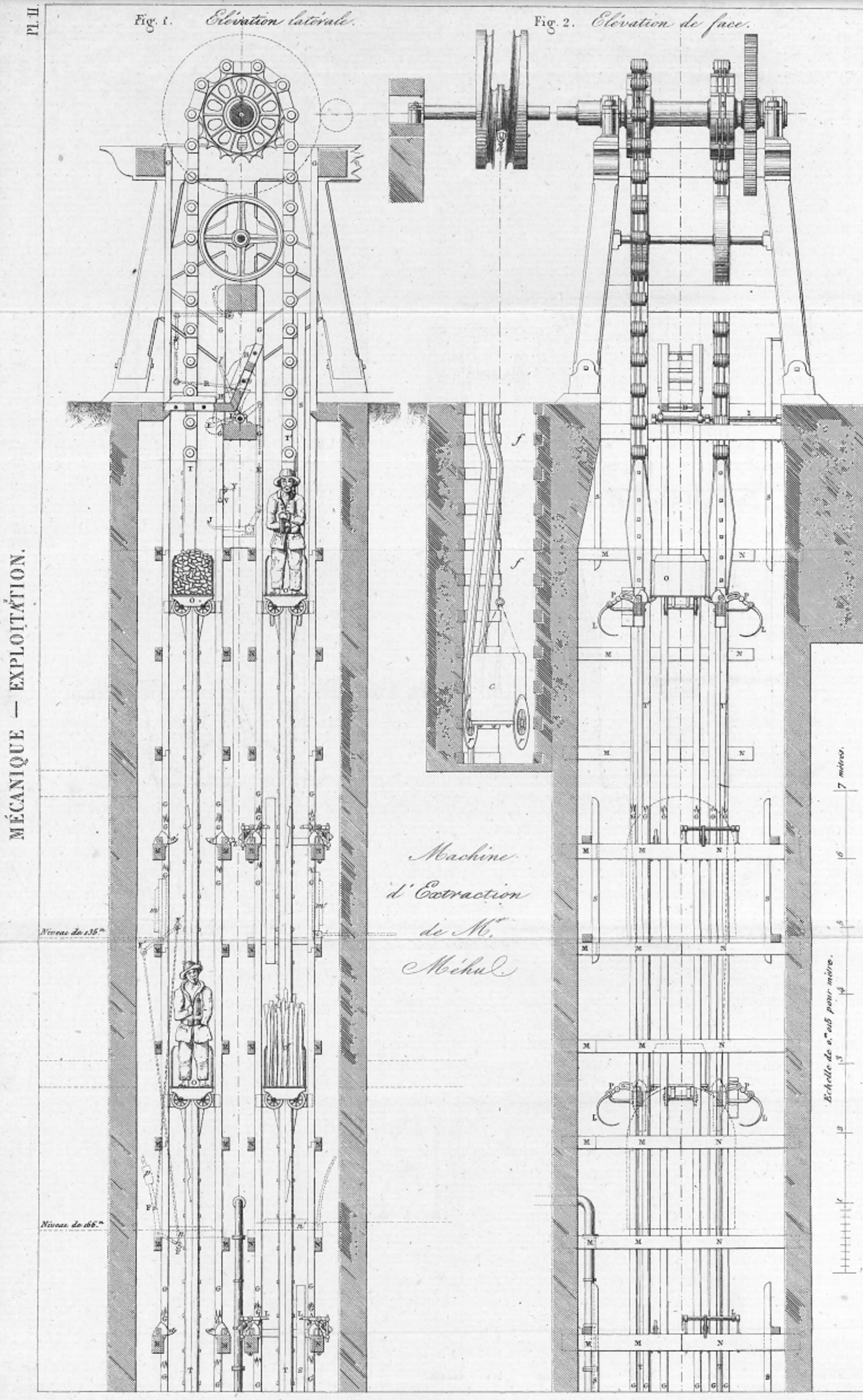
The cleat machine.

In 1850, more than 200 meters below the surface, a steam engine and two boilers were installed in a large room close to the coal beds. The room, 50 meters from the shaft, is 17 meters long, 8 meters wide, and 4 meters high, and is supported by a massive oak framework, some parts of which are 40 cm square. This steam engine powers the cleat machine installed in the 700-meter-long inclined plane. The underground machines and boilers were supplied by Sthelier of Thann, as were the engine and all the cleat equipment for the vertical shaft. These elements were installed and ready for use on May 20, 1852. Until 1853, major mechanical operating problems were encountered, but these were resolved as testing progressed. Engineer Schutz was one of the instigators of this initiative, the machinery having been invented by Mr. Mehus 1. Conversely, engineer Francois Mathet, who joined the company in 1855, was highly critical of the system and its adoption, finding it dangerous for miners' lives due to the drought that could disrupt ventilation and even cause firedamp. He also described the fragility of the woodwork and the high temperatures the drivers had to endure. On October 19, the underground boilers were lit, but immediately the fire, fanned by the 250-meter-high chimney, sucked all the air out of the mine. As a result, ventilation was difficult, and the workings were invaded by firedamp. On March 12, 1853, the inclined plane's cleat machine was put into operation. The water accumulated at the bottom of the large chute is evacuated by hand pumps installed at the top and bottom of the inclined plane over 200 meters. These pumps were operated by women. But on April 1, despite all the precautions taken, a fire broke out in the woods near the boilers.

In 1855 and again in 1856, the Saint-Charles shaft produced 54,081 tonnes of coal thanks to the cleat machine. That same year, however, the decision was made to abandon this machine. At the same time, the women were dismissed from mine 1. The following year, the machine was dismantled and replaced by a wheel mining machine. This set in motion two cables, one ascending, the other descending, and vice-versa. Each cable was guided by two parallel wooden sills.

In May 1852, a second machine of the same type, but vertical, was put into service over the entire height of the shaft, replacing the Meyer coil machine. It too suffered numerous breakdowns, requiring frequent shutdowns to readjust various parts over several months and in the years that followed. Finally, on March 29, 1857, the Board of Directors decided to return to the cable extraction system, and the vertical cleat machine was dismantled in 48 days, starting the following May 17. A 9-meter-high wooden headframe was built over the shaft, and the Meyer machine was refurbished.

=== Accidents and disasters ===
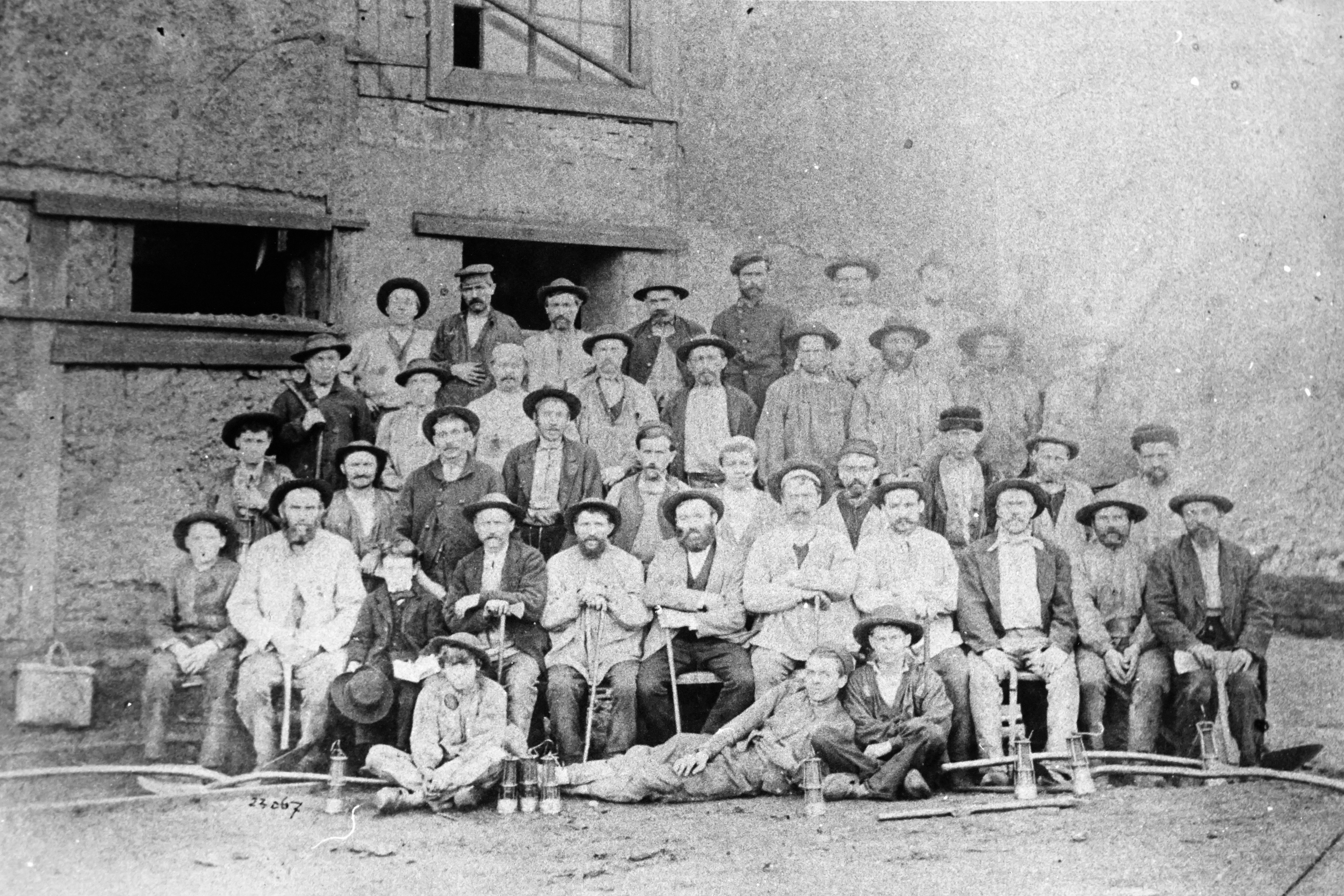
Miners in the shaft around 1880.

Three firedamp blasts occurred in 1857: eight miners perished on January 29, two on March 3, and two on March 14. On March 16, the entire workforce went on strike of these disasters. The shaft was deemed too dangerous, with poor ventilation and faulty equipment. The management lodged a complaint for coalition offenses, but the Haute-Saône prefecture ruled in favor of the miners, and the engineer was sentenced to prison for flagrant breaches of safety.

On November 8, 1857, a fire broke out in the underground boiler room. The openings of shafts no. 7 and Saint-Charles are hermetically sealed. On January 18 the following year, a dog and a lighted lamp descended to the bottom of the shaft to test for the presence of a firedamp. On January 30, the openings in both shafts were reopened. However, energetic ventilation rekindled the fire in the coal. In 1859, water flooded the mine after more than six months of inactivity.

In 1886, the shaft was bricked up from top to bottom, with a diameter of 3.30 meters. At the bottom, for the first time in Ronchamp, metal frames were installed over a kilometer of the gallery. Unfortunately, in June of the same year, another firedamp explosion killed twenty-three people.

=== The ending ===
After the 1886 disaster, a large part of the galleries and the construction site were destroyed, in addition, forty years of intensive mining had greatly depleted the deposit, leaving the shaft virtually abandoned. But three years later, strong demand for coal prompted the company to rehabilitate the entire site and resume mining.

In 1891, the pit was fitted out to accommodate around a hundred workers, but two years later, work was again halted, and only water was brought up from the shaft. The following year, mining was resumed to remove the remains of coal panels, (Note: The panels are large-area pillars or unused mine areas.) estimated to weigh 10,000 tonnes. They were excavated at a rate of 100 tonnes per day by around one hundred workers. In October 1895, the workers completed the stripping (Note: When a mine or shaft is mined, galleries are dug in a checkerboard pattern to extract the coal, forming regular, square natural pillars. When all the galleries have been dug, these pillars, which contain a lot of coal, are removed. This is known as “de-piling”.) and proceeded with the clearing. (Note: When digging the galleries, natural pillars are not enough, so wooden beams are installed. At the end of the operation, they are reclaimed. This is known as “deforestation”.) This work was completed in December of the same year. The shaft was then backfilled.

== Conversion ==
The shaft was backfilled from January to June 1896 at around ten carloads of shale per day. In May, an eight-meter-thick plug of clay and concrete was installed to make the shaft watertight. The surface installations were demolished, except the machine building, which was converted into housing, and another building which housed accommodation and the “La Ruche” store. The adjacent store was demolished in 2005 after being destroyed by fire.

At the beginning of the 21st century, several of the pit's buildings still stand, including the well-preserved mining machine building, repainted white, and the large building housing the mine masters and the canteen. All these buildings have now been converted into housing.

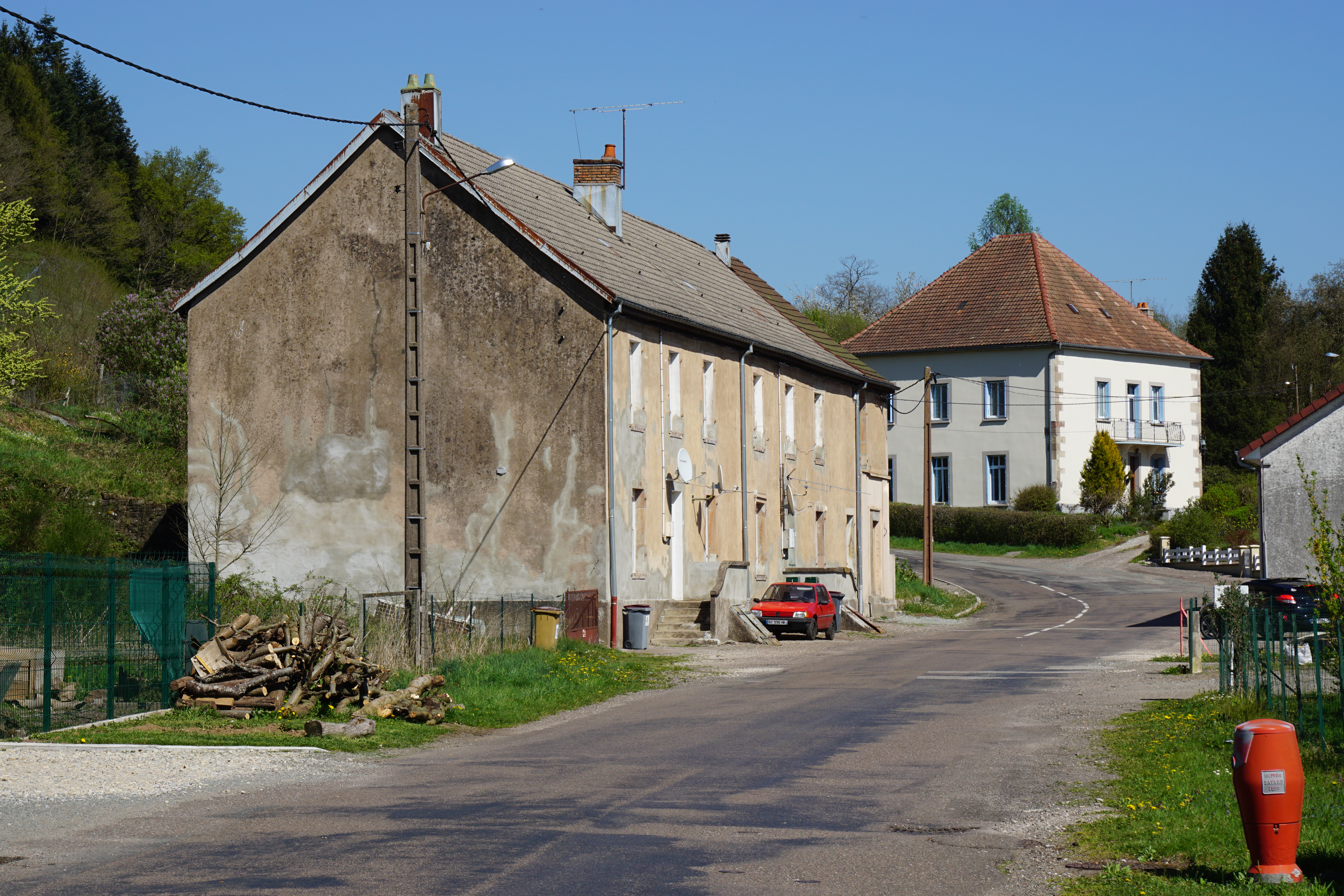
The floor of the Saint-Charles well in 2015.

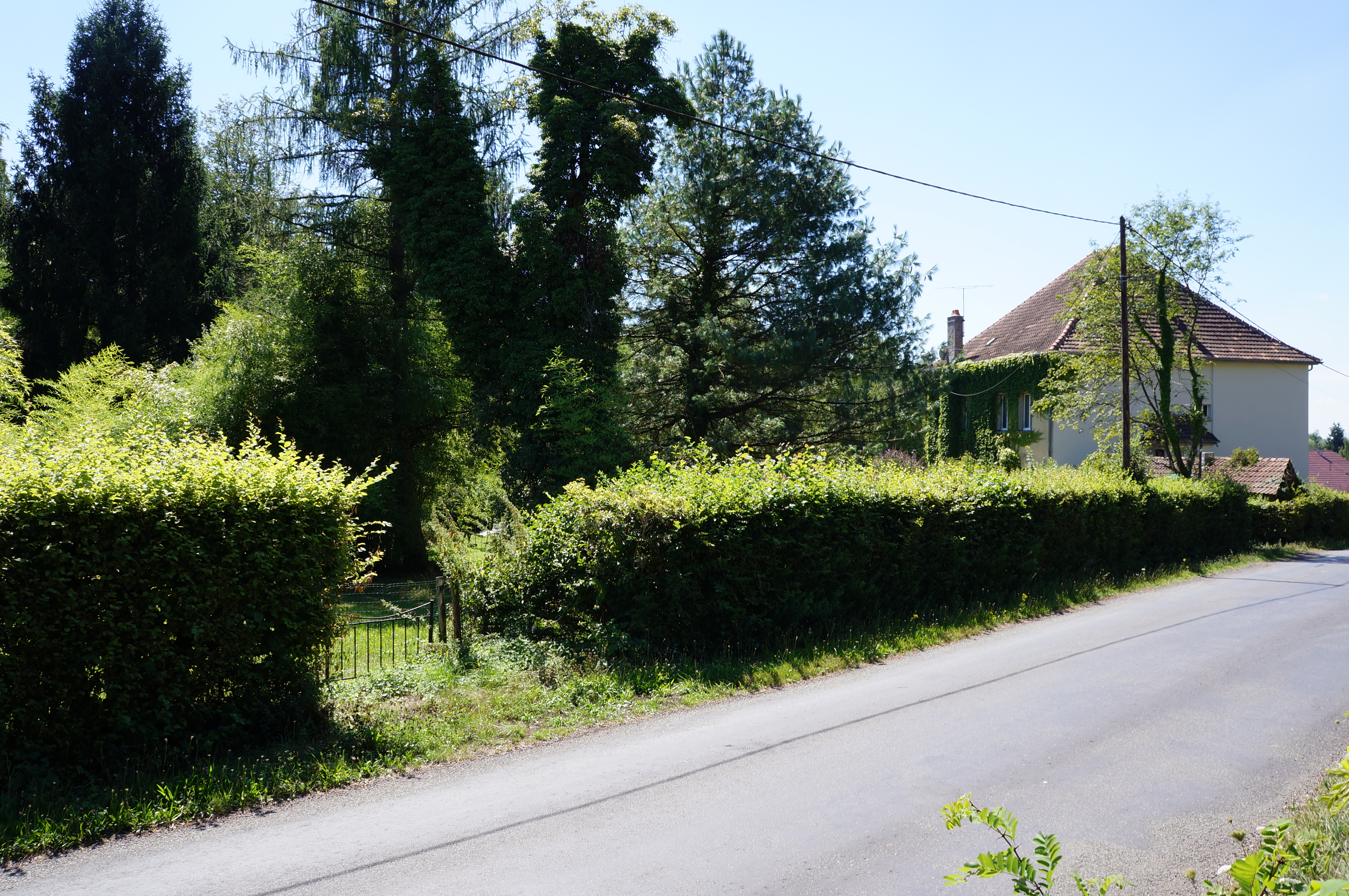
Area where the well is located.

== Mining town and shops ==
47.702515°N 6.653095°E

The environment of the Saint-Charles well and its ancillary facilities. slag heaps Mine buildings Mining town Coal mining network Line from Vesoul to Plancher-les-Mines Chemins de fer vicinaux de la Haute-Saône Ligne de Paris-Est à Mulhouse-Ville Compagnie des chemins de fer de l'Est then Société nationale des chemins de fer français

In 1866, a food and clothing store was built on the site of the Saint-Charles well, next to the offices. It was later expanded to include a bakery and butcher's shop, and named “La Ruche”. The store was run by the company, and miners' purchases were deducted directly from their wages via their order and payroll books. After the Second World War, the store became a cooperative limited company with shares on the stock exchange.

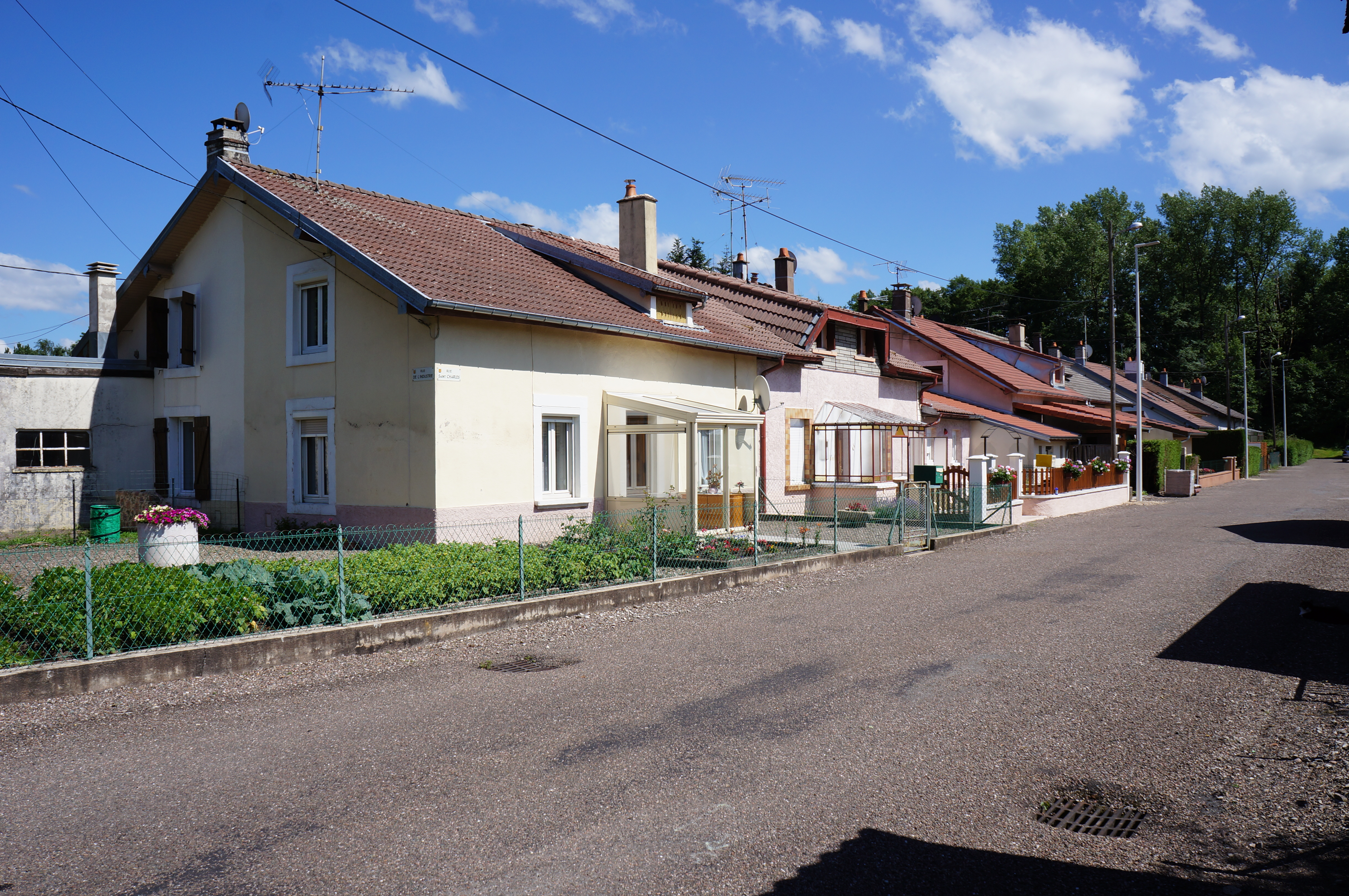
Saint-Charles housing estate.

To accommodate the large workforce employed at the Saint-Charles shaft, a mining housing estate was built in 1872, a few dozen meters from the pithead. It consisted of four houses built of roughcast sandstone rubble, each with a single storey and long-sloped mechanical tile roofs. Although the collieries had originally intended to build 24 dwellings, they had to give up for financial reasons. Each house is divided into four units, with two bedrooms, a kitchen, a cellar, an attic, and a garden for each family. On March 11, 2010, the houses were listed in the general inventory of cultural heritage.

== The slag heap ==
The “terril du puits Saint-Charles” is a fairly extensive flat slag heap where waste rock has been piling up for half a century. Between 1926 and 1931, the slag heap's shales were sorted at the coal washing center to extract the remaining coal that was used as fuel for the boilers installed on the Chanois plain.

In June 1993, the 15-metre-high slag heap containing 35,000 m^{3} of shale caught fire. A neighboring plant (MagLum) had previously buried waste such as zinc, cyanide, nickel, sulfur, polyurethane foam, hydrogen sulfide, phenols and hydrocarbon derivatives there. Thick black smoke billowed over the communes of Ronchamp and Champagney, causing concern and mobilizing the population. Gas analyses and health monitoring of children were carried out (27 of them complained of various symptoms: vomiting, nausea, headaches, throat and eye irritations). Analyses revealed heavy metal content (including aluminum) 750 times higher than the norm, as well as traces of trichloroethylene and nitrate vapors. Despite the intervention of the fire department and the installation of firebreak trenches and barriers, the fire persisted for months. Part of the slag heap had to be moved in 1994 to extinguish it. The slag heap was then used as backfill for a road. The Saint-Charles pit still has a large slag heap, even though a large part of it was removed during the fire.

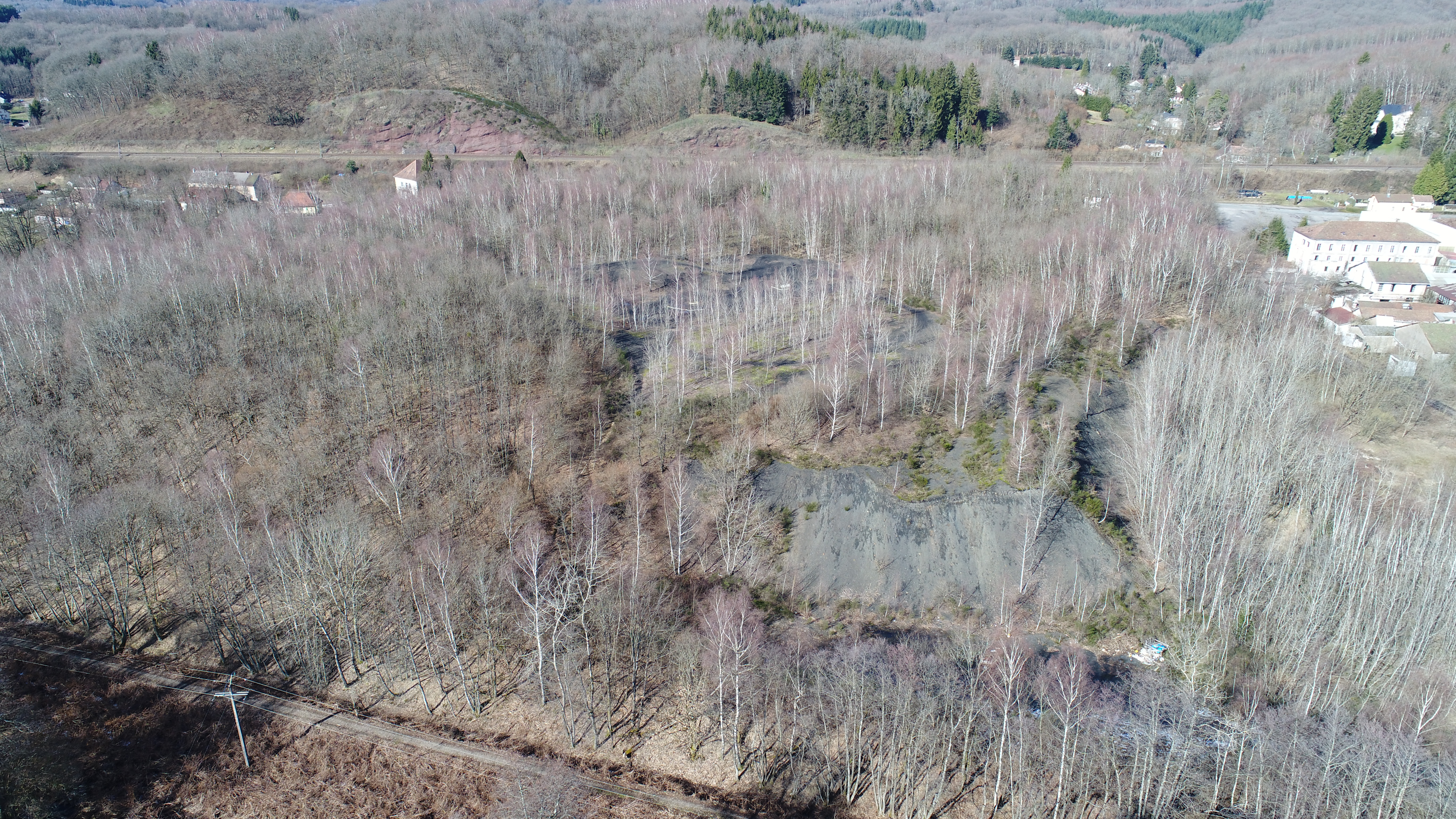
General aerial view of the slag heap, shaft buildings and large offices.

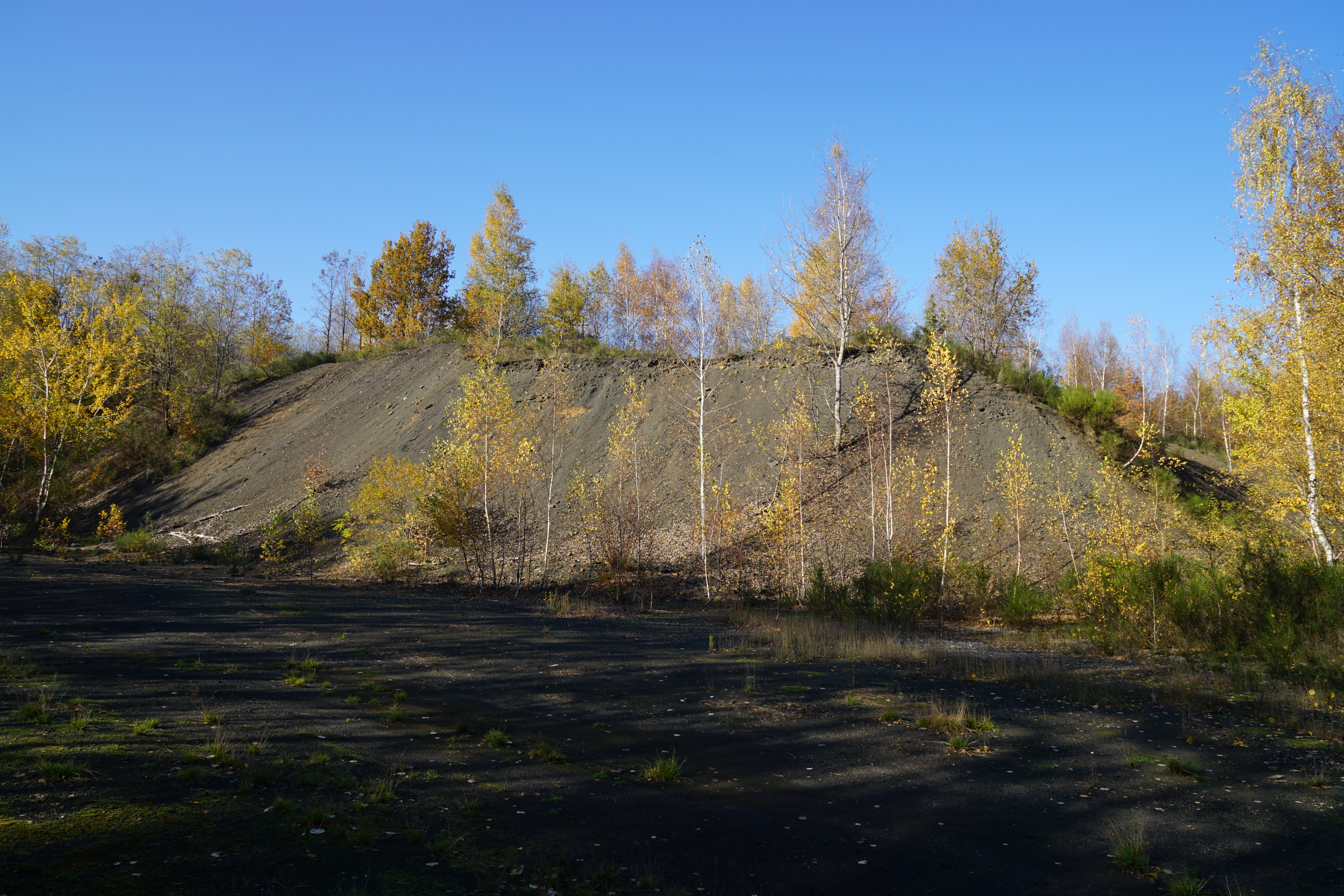
View of the slag heap.

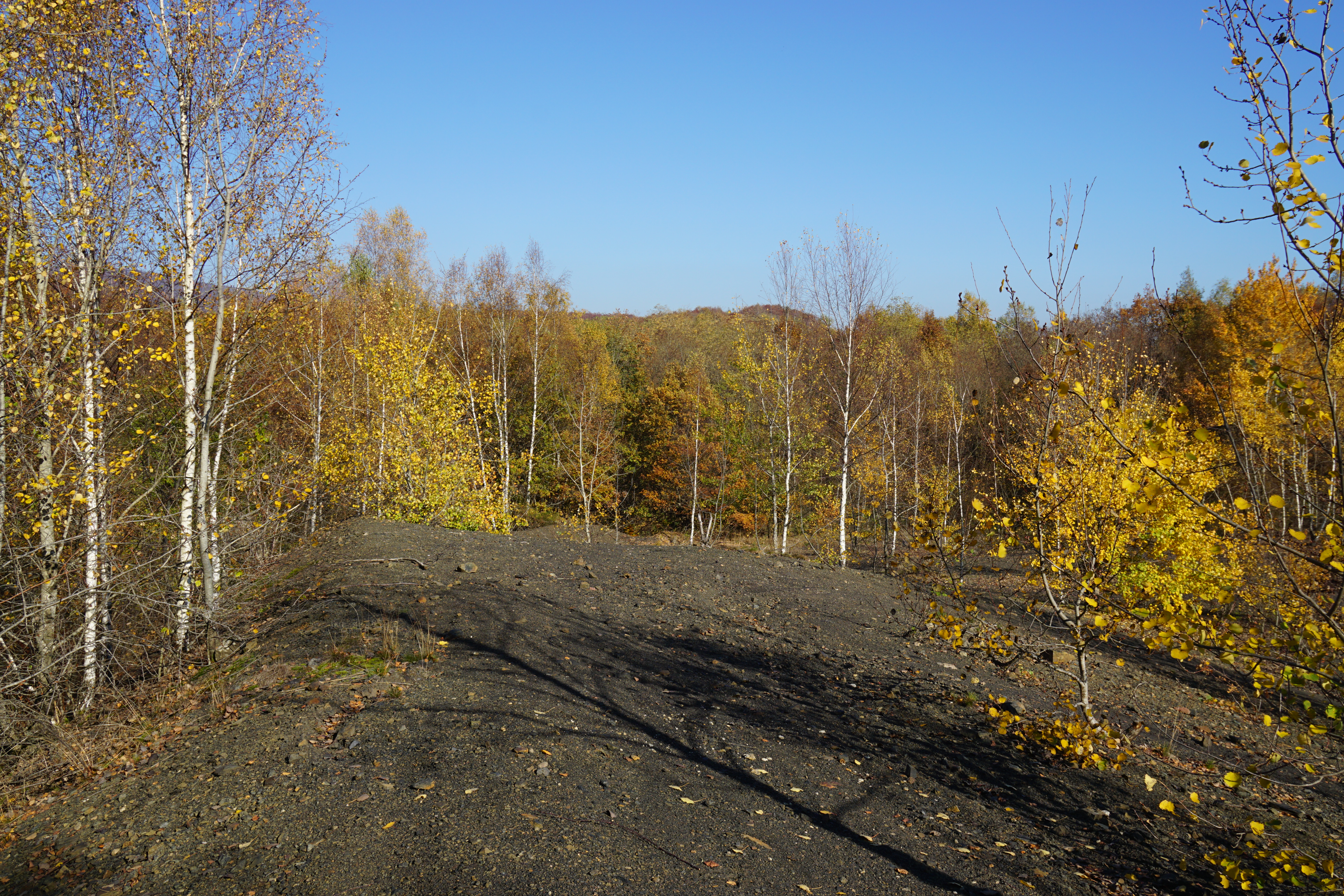
The summit.

== Workshops and offices ==
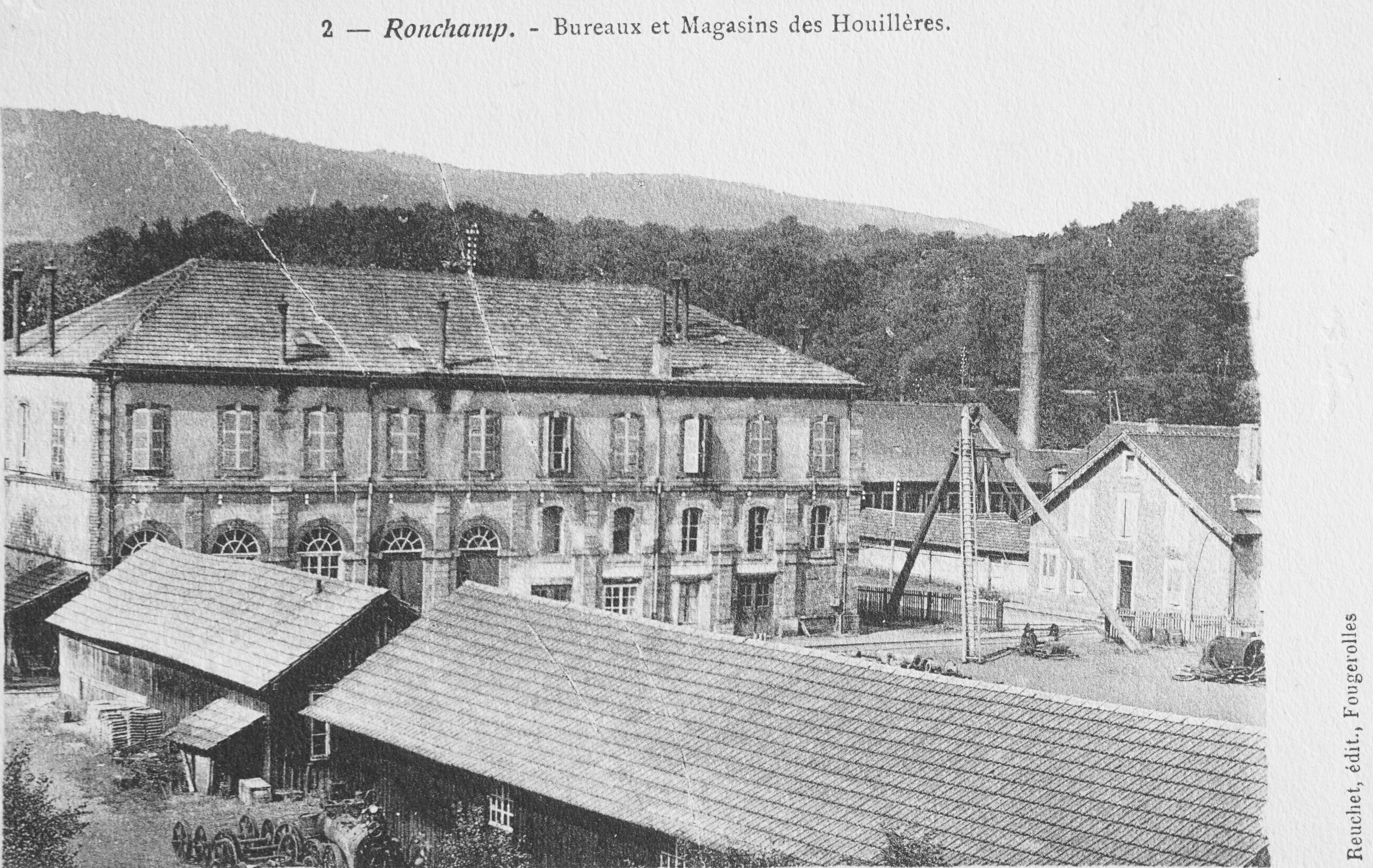
Large offices and workshops.

47.702515°N 6.653095°E

Shortly after the opening of the shaft and its good results, the company decided to set up its central workshops and offices next to the shaft and established a link with the rail network. These facilities remained the nerve center of the collieries until their closure in 1958. The site was converted into a car manufacturing subcontracting plant before being decommissioned in 2008. At the beginning of the 21st century, the site was used for exhibitions and shooting games.

== The station ==
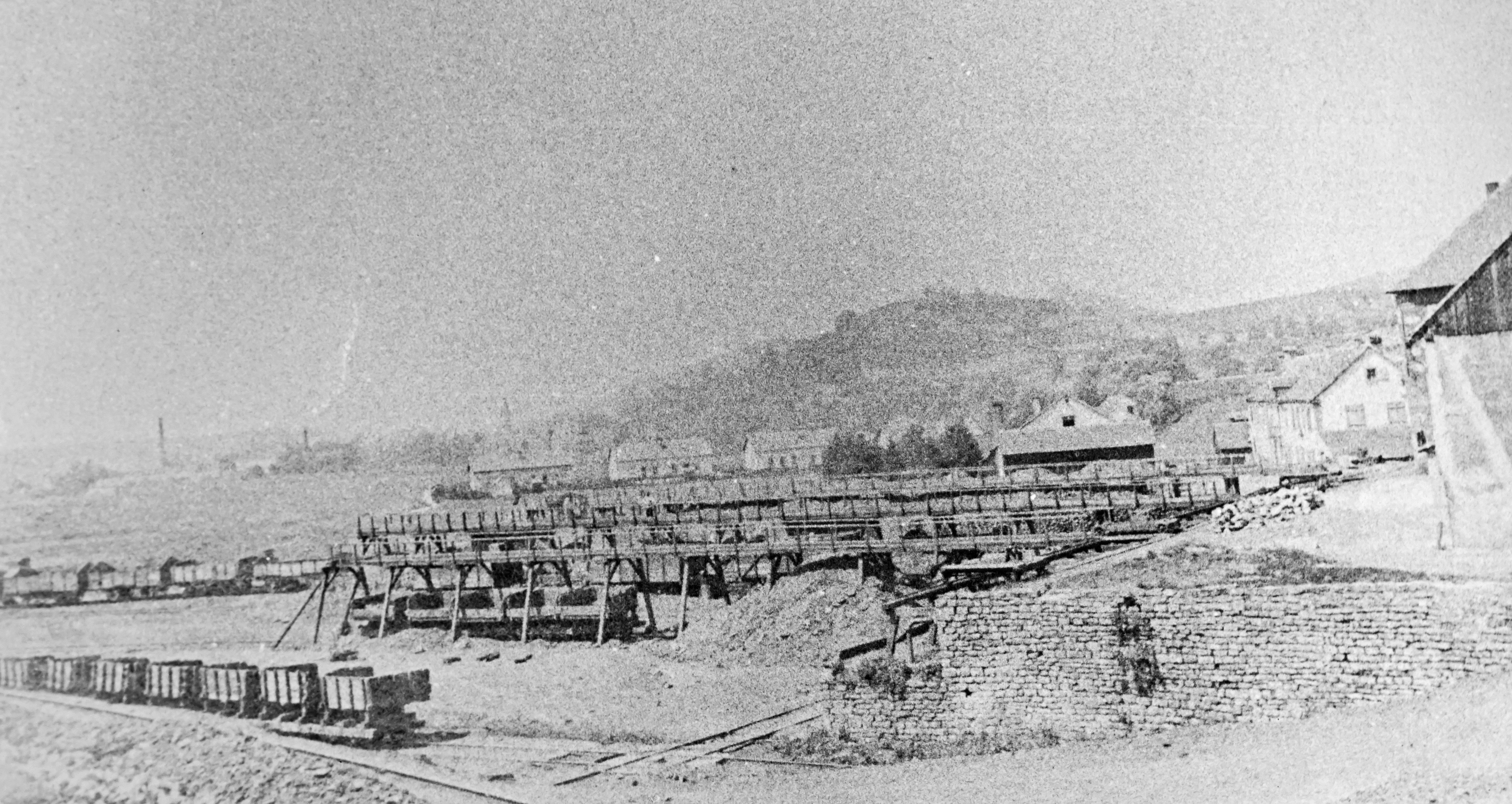
Loading coal wagons at the shaft exit.

47.703343°N 6.653262°E

Once the coal carts have been hauled up from the Saint-Charles shaft, they are emptied into large wagons. The wagons are transferred to a station close to the shaft via a railroad built in 1858, before the coal is shipped to the coal mine's customers, most of whom are from Alsace, via the Paris-Est to Mulhouse-Ville railroad.

The station was in operation from the mid-19th century until 1958, when the mines closed, after which it was dismantled. At the beginning of the 21st century, the station site was overgrown, and only a few remnants of the installations and network remained.

== See also ==
- Ronchamp coal mines
- Mining in France
- Sainte-Barbe Coal Mine
- Cokerie-lavoir du Chanois

== Bibliography ==
- Parietti, Jean-Jacques (2001). Les Houillères de Ronchamp. Éditions Comtoises. ISBN 2-914425-08-2.
- Parietti, Jean-Jacques (2010). Les Houillères de Ronchamp, vol. 2: Les mineurs. Franche-Comté culture & patrimoine. ISBN 978-2-36230-001-1.
- Parietti, Jean-Jacques (1999). Le puits Saint-Charles, coll. Les dossiers de la Houillère. Ronchamp, Association des amis du musée de la mine.
- Mathet, François (1882). Mémoire sur les mines de Ronchamp. Société de l'industrie minérale.
- PNRBV (1999). Le charbon de Ronchamp : circuits miniers de Ronchamp, coll. « Déchiffrer le patrimoine ». Parc naturel régional des Ballons des Vosges. ISBN 2-910328-31-7.
- Société de l'industrie minérale, Bulletin trimestriel. Saint-Étienne. 1882.
- Thirria, Édouard (1869). Manuel à l'usage de l'habitant du département de la Haute-Saône.
- Godard, Michel (2012). Enjeux et impacts de l'exploitation minière du bassin houiller de Ronchamp.
