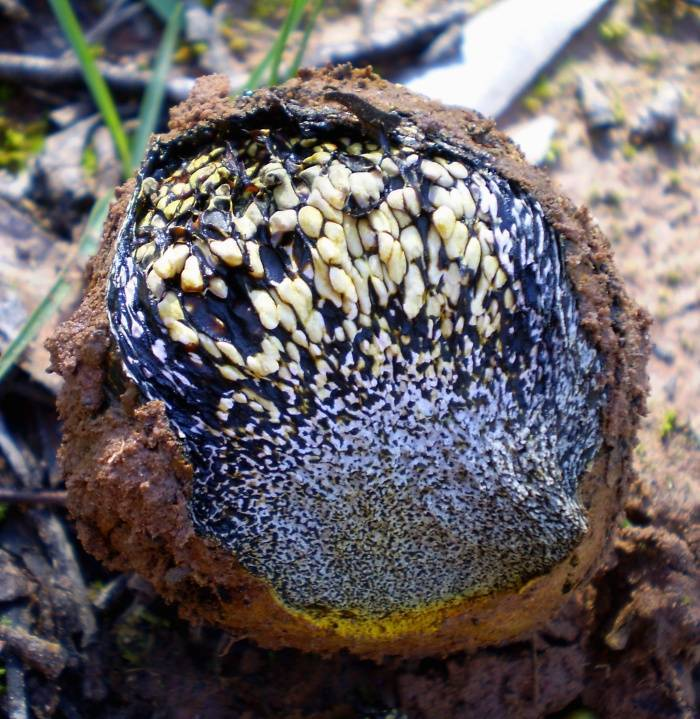
- Pisolithus arhizus

Scientific classification
- Kingdom: Fungi
- Division: Basidiomycota
- Class: Agaricomycetes
- Order: Boletales
- Family: Sclerodermataceae
- Genus: Pisolithus; Alb. & Schwein. (1805)

Type species
- Pisolithus arhizus (Scop.) Rauschert (1959)

Synonyms
- Pisocarpium Link (1809); Pisomyces Fr. (1817); Polypera Pers. (1818)

= Pisolithus =

Genus of fungi

Pisolithus is a genus of fungi within the family Sclerodermataceae (suborder Sclerodermatineae).

== Species ==
As accepted by Species Fungorum;

- Pisolithus abditus Kanch., Sihan., Hogetsu & Watling (2003) – Thailand
- Pisolithus albus (Cooke & Massee) Priest (2018)
- Pisolithus arenarius Alb. & Schwein. (1805)
- Pisolithus arhizus (Scop.) Rauschert (1959)
- Pisolithus aurantioscabrosus Watling (1995) - Malaysia
- Pisolithus aureosericeus M.P. Martín, Kaewgraj., Phosri & Watling (2016)
- Pisolithus calongei M.P. Martín, Phosri & Watling (2013)
- Pisolithus capsulifer (Sowerby) Watling, Phosri & M.P. Martín (2012)
- Pisolithus croceorrhizus P. Leonard & McMull.-Fish. (2013)
- Pisolithus hypogaeus S.R. Thomas, Dell & Trappe (2003) – Australia
- Pisolithus indicus Natarajan & Senthil. (2005) – India
- Pisolithus kisslingii E. Fisch. (1906)
- Pisolithus marmoratus (Berk.) E. Fisch. (1900)
- Pisolithus microcarpus (Cooke & Massee) G. Cunn. (1931)
- Pisolithus orientalis Watling, Phosri & M.P. Martín (2012)
- Pisolithus thermaeus T. Lebel, Pennycook & Beever (2018)
- Pisolithus tinctorius (Mont.) E. Fisch. (1900)
- Pisolithus tympanobaculus T. Lebel & M.D. Barrett (2018)

Former species (all Sclerodermataceae family);

- P. arenarius var. novozeelandicus Henn. (1894) = Pisolithus arhizus
- P. australis (Lév.) E. Fisch. (1900) = Pisolithus arhizus
- P. crassipes (DC.) J. Schröt. (1889) = Pisolithus arhizus
- P. tinctorius (Pers.) Coker & Couch (1928) = Pisolithus arhizus
- P. tinctorius f. clavatus (Nees) Pilát (1958) = Pisolithus arhizus
- P. tinctorius f. conglomeratus (Fr.) Pilát (1958) = Pisolithus arhizus
- P. tinctorius f. olivaceus (Fr.) Pilát (1958) = Pisolithus arhizus
- P. tinctorius f. pisocarpium (Fr.) Pilát (1958) = Pisolithus arhizus
- P. tinctorius f. tuberosus (P. Micheli ex Fr.) Pilát (1958) = Pisolithus arhizus
- P. tinctorius f. turgidus (Fr.) Pilát (1958) = Pisolithus arhizus
- P. tuberosus (P. Micheli ex Fr.) Migula (1912) = Pisolithus arhizus
- P. turgidus (Fr.) Migula (1912) = Pisolithus arhizus
