= Pisolithus hypogaeus =

Scientific classification
- Domain: Eukaryota
- Kingdom: Fungi
- Division: Basidiomycota
- Class: Agaricomycetes
- Order: Boletales
- Family: Sclerodermataceae
- Genus: Pisolithus
- Species: P. hypogaeus

Binomial name
- Pisolithus hypogaeus S.R. Thomas, Dell & Trappe

Species of fungus

Pisolithus hypogaeus is a fungus in the genus Pisolithus, occurring in coastal south-western Australia in association with eucalypt ectomycorrhizal hosts on sandy soils. DNA samples show that Pisolithus hypogaeus is a relative of other brown- and echinulate-spored Pisolithus species, and is most closely related to two undescribed epigeous Pisolithus species from Australia.
