= Pisolithus marmoratus =

Scientific classification
- Domain: Eukaryota
- Kingdom: Fungi
- Division: Basidiomycota
- Class: Agaricomycetes
- Order: Boletales
- Family: Sclerodermataceae
- Genus: Pisolithus
- Species: P. marmoratus

Binomial name
- Pisolithus marmoratus Engler & Prantl, Nat.Pflanzenfam. I(1):338 (1900)

Species of fungus

Pisolithus marmoratus is a species of gasteroid fungus.

== Description ==
Appears as a roughly spherical fruiting-body mottled with shades of black, brown and gold and with a rough surface texture. Like other Pisolithus species it is sometimes described as resembling horse dung.

P. marmoratus has been sighted across the world in association with plants in the Myrtaceae family. It is native to Australia.
