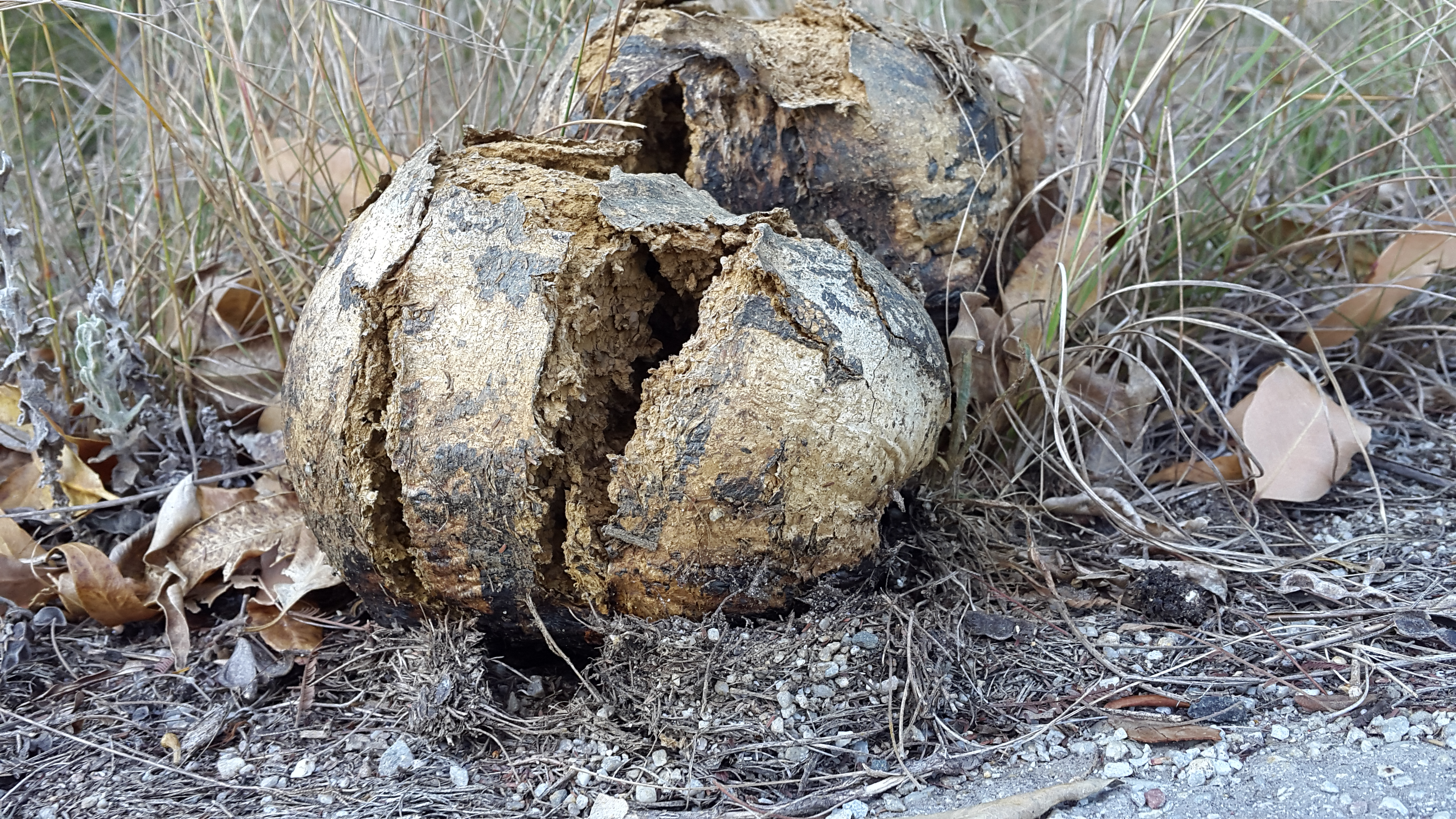

Scientific classification
- Kingdom: Fungi
- Division: Basidiomycota
- Class: Agaricomycetes
- Order: Boletales
- Family: Sclerodermataceae
- Genus: Pisolithus
- Species: P. arhizus

Binomial name
- Pisolithus arhizus (Scop.) Rauschert (1959)

Synonyms
- Lycoperdon arrizon Scop. (1786); Pisolithus tinctorius; Others: https://www.speciesfungorum.org/names/Synonymy.asp?RecordID=276857

= Pisolithus arhizus =

Species of fungus

Pisolithus arhizus
- Mycological characteristics
- Glebal hymenium
- No distinct cap
- Hymenium attachment is irregular or not applicable
- Lacks a stipe
- Spore print is brown
- Ecology is mycorrhizal
- Edibility is inedible

Pisolithus arhizus is a fungus in the order Boletales, also known as the Dead Man's Foot, dyeball, pardebal, Horse Dung Fungus, Earth Ball, Pea Stone fungus or Bohemian truffle. It earned its many names over time due to its notable appearance.

== Taxonomy ==
This Basidiomycete was first described in Europe in 1786 by an Italian naturalist and medical doctor by the name of Giovanni Antonio Scopoli, who originally thought it was a puffball. The species has been described multiple times throughout history and has a number of synonymous names, but they all describe the same fungus.

This species is found in parts of Europe, Asia, and Africa, and in recent years it was found for the first time in Central Asia in Tashkent, Uzbekistan. It's also been found in regions of the Middle East such as Iran. Although it has exclusively Old World distribution, Pisolithus arhizus was originally thought to be distributed worldwide. Newer research revealed that the North American dyeballs often mistaken for it have sublte differences, and are now recognized as Pisolithus arenarius which is a different species entirely.

== Morphology ==
The fruiting body is varying in size, and can be 5–16 cm high; 4–10 cm across. Immatures have been described to be oblong, somewhat resembling the shape of a rugby ball. There is some variation in coloration, and mature Pisolithus arhizus feature a shiny gray/brown shell with darker and lighter/whitish/yellowish patches depending on the specimen. As it ages, the fungus can develop a rudimentary stipe or stem, although not all will do this. It also tends to open up, exposing "cracks and fissures, and eventually breaking up to expose the interior." This outer peridium is roughly 1mm thick and within it can be found a mass of pea-sized "pseudoperidioles" which are structures that contain and produce spores, and are fixed in a dark gel. As a reproductive strategy, P. arhizus will release spores to the wind as the peridium turns dry and crumbly/powdery with time. The fungus has ornamental spores that are described as "khaki" or "cinnamon" brown, and measure roughly 5-8µm in size.

== Ecology ==
Pisolithus arhizus fruits in the late summer to fall seasons, and is known to be quite durable; it is found in some unlikely places, tolerating intense soil conditions such as low ph and water concentration, or high temperatures and levels of metal contamination. Specifically, it is often found in soils with gravel and sand as well as in spots like ditches or lawns. Its ecological versatility was likely helpful in achieving its Old World distribution in multiple continents (Europe, Africa, Asia).

The Pisolithus genus as a whole is a known ectomycorrhizal group, meaning that it forms a symbiotic relationship with trees and their roots, in which both organisms mutually benefit. While Pisolithus in general is known to associate with over 50 host plants, P. arhizus is found most commonly with species of "pines, oaks, cedars, birch, Douglas-fir, hemlock, willow, poplar, beech." Ectomycorrhizal (ECM) fungi are known for aiding in plant growth and offering protection from different abiotic and biotic factors. They often work to accomplish mineral weathering in order to breakdown harsh rocks and soils, and reallocate these and other nutrients to their host plants. In return, plants supply fungi with carbon, and some estimates suggest some ECM relationships could even account for roughly a fifth of a tree's net carbon budget. P. arhizus specifically is shown to have positive performances on photosynthesis, biomass, and nutrient uptake.

Numerous scientific studies on the complex symbiotic relationships of P. arhizus have proved its positive ECM effects on a variety of host plants. In Quercus ilex oaks, the fungus neutralizes harmful compounds from the tree's own leaf litter and transfer the helpful nutrients back to the tree through the roots - an essential step for making certain growing conditions possible for these oaks. Another study shows that P. arhizus aided White Clover (Trifolium repens) growth in contaminated mining soils, and improved the growth as well as the mercury tolerance in these plants by substantial amounts.

== Biology and Uses ==
Recent research has been done to more deeply understand the chemical composition and biological properties of P. arhizus. A modern study testing P.arhizus compounds looked into the cellular compounds and discovered twenty new "triterpenoid" compounds that had never before been documented, as well as assorted pigments and phenolic acids.

As its chemical composure continues to be researched, studies have revealed medical potential in the Pisolithus group in general. A study on the broader genus revealed compounds with significant antibiotic properties and killed resistant strains of bacteria from real patients' wounds. Also, certain triterpenoids yielded impressive results in killing leukemia, melanoma, and brain cancer cells without harming the healthy human blood cells they were with. A paper that hones in on Pisolithus arhizus specifically notes that arhizus had anti-genotoxic properties in addition to the antibacterial effects found from using methanol and ethanol extracts of the fungus (in comparison to the specific isolated compounds from the study mentioned before). The fungus also showed strong cytotoxicity (at high concentrations eliminated up to 97% cancer cells) against a colon cancer cell line. Although the study didn't give results of the testing on healthy human cells, it's findings are promising for future research. Besides the potential newer effects as antibiotics or anti-cancers, P. arhizus has traditionally been used for wound healing and hemorrhagic disorders in places such as Italy and regions of Africa.

Looking beyond the composition of P. arhizus, the species has a number of confirmed uses as well as theoretical potentials. A traditional use of the fungus is as a dyeing agent (hence "dyeball") of assorted textiles, producing a range of pigments varying in description from yellow to shades of brown. P. arhizus has also has been mentioned for its use in forestry and land restoration as a mycorrhizal agent for inoculation projects, and some online gardening websites mention its positive effects on plant performance.

== Culture ==
Historically, mushrooms that resemble human body parts or rotting flesh (such as this one) hold cultural relevance. In European and Indigenous cultures these types of fungi were frequently associated with supernatural beliefs or omens. In the past Dead Man's Foot held significance in land-spirit and fertility myths in some regions.

== Edibility ==
While sources on the edibility of P. arhizus differ regarding its safety, it’s worth noting that it could be toxic and eating it is not a safe choice. While one paper mentions putting it in soup, it’s not recommended due to its unappealing texture, taste, and consistency. Due to its growth habits in contaminated or disturbed areas and soil, the fungi can absorb and contain pollutants or harmful compounds from its environment. Pisolithus Arhizus can pose a potential health risk if ingested for this reason alone.
