= Emory Kemp =

American engineer and historian (1931–2020)

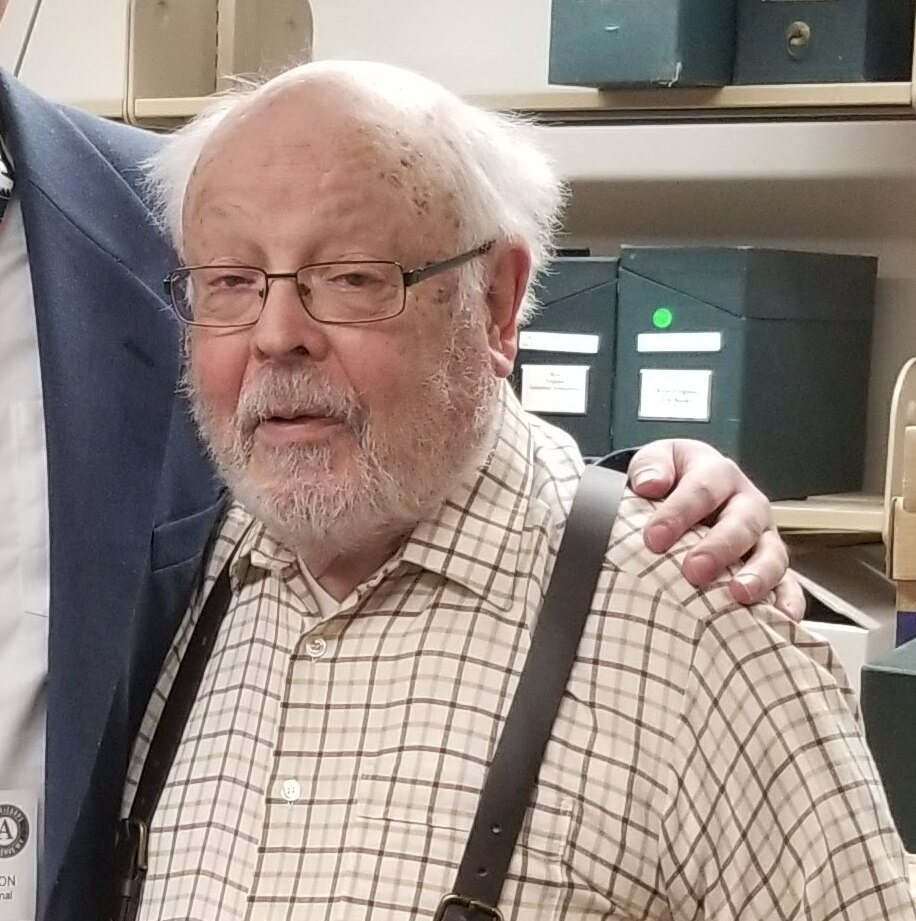
- Kemp in 2018
- Born: Emory Leland Kemp; October 1, 1931; Chicago, Illinois, U.S.
- Died: 20 January 2020 (aged 88)

Emory Leland Kemp (1 October 1931 – January 20, 2020) was an American archaeologist. He was the founder and director of the Institute for the History of Technology and Industrial Archaeology at West Virginia University. There, he was Chair and Professor of Civil Engineering at the Benjamin M. Statler College of Engineering & Mineral Resources, and a professor of history in the Eberly College of Arts and Sciences. Until his death, he served as Professor Emeritus for the Department of History at West Virginia University.

Kemp served as President of the Public Works Historical Society. He presented and published many works on industrial archaeology, engineering, the history of technology, and structural mechanics. Many of his public works can be found in journals such as IA, The Journal of the Society for Industrial Archeology, Public Historian, Essays in Public Works History, Public Works Magazine, and Canal History and Technology Proceedings.

== Life ==
Emory Leland Kemp was born in Chicago on Thursday, October 1, 1931 at 4:10 p.m. in Jackson Park (Chicago) Hospital.

Kemp became an Eagle Scout with three palms.

While Kemp was working with Colonel Hudson in the Army, "I'm not sure how he did it, but my whole company was sent to Korea, except for me, and I got a special order." Emory was requested to go to the Engineer Research and Development Center in Alexandria, Virginia, "so I fought the Korean War in Washington. I have really nice memories of that." There, he took an advanced mathematics courses and structural engineering courses. "The only thing I remember which was, um, quite memorable, on guard duty we had to have fixed bayonets, and if you could stand there with a bayonet under your chin, if you nodded off you stabbed yourself, so it kept you awake. And, one time I was running very late and I ended up in a differential equations course at George Washington University in full uniform with a bayonet! Um, I don't think you could do that today—I was ready."

Emory Kemp was married with three adult children and lived in Morgantown, West Virginia. He died at the J. W. Ruby Memorial Hospital in Morgantown, on January 20, 2020.

== Career ==
=== Consulting ===
Kemp's consulting career began at Ove Arup, a global firm. There, he conducted analytical calculations for the roof of the Sydney Opera House in Australia, noting this was no simple task, as Jørn Utzon's sketches were designed to embellish the beauty of the international landmark, not necessarily for simple mathematics.

Kemp continued to offer consulting work throughout his career as a Professor at West Virginia University. His work included many projects, including the restoration of the Philippi Covered Bridge.

He was a project coordinator for the move and restoration of the Staats Mill Covered Bridge.

=== Publications ===
Kemp had a long list of publications in civil engineering, specifically suspension bridges, wrought iron, mills, canals, and the history of these subjects, and as a result paved the way for the "new interdisciplinary field" known as industrial archaeology.

Kemp was the author of the text Essays on the History of Transportation and Technology.

Kemp was the co-author of the text Houses and Homes: Exploring Their History, along with Barbara Howe. The text covers American housing patterns, the individual characteristics of houses in different regions, construction techniques and materials, household technology, and family lifestyles.

Emory contributed authorship to the West Virginia Encyclopedia. He wrote articles on bridges, cable-stayed bridges, Claudius Crozet, the Fairmont High Level Bridge, Frank Duff McEnteer, swinging bridges, the Weston and Gauley Bridge Turnpike, and the Wheeling Suspension Bridge

=== Awards ===
Upon graduation from the University of Illinois in civil engineering, Kemp received the Ira O. Baker for outstanding achievement.

Kemp received numerous awards, including the coveted election as an Honorary Member of the American Society of Civil Engineers. This is the highest award given by the Society of 140,000 members.

In 1986, Kemp received the Distinguished Alumni Award from his alma mater, the University of Illinois Civil and Environmental Engineering Alumni Association.

The Society for Industrial Archeology awarded Kemp the 1993 SIA General Tools Award for Distinguished Service to Industrial Archeology.

Kemp had an award created in his honor, by the Preservation Alliance of West Virginia, an organization which he is a co-founder of. The award is the Dr. Emory Kemp Lifetime Achievement Award.
