= Greater London Industrial Archaeology Society =

Industrial archaeology society in London

- Abbreviation: GLIAS
- Predecessor: Thames Valley Observation Group
- Formation: 1968; 58 years ago
- Legal status: Charity
- Purpose: Industrial archaeology
- Location: London, England
- Leader: Dan Hayton
- Chairman: Tim Sidaway
- Publication: London's Industrial Archaeology
- Affiliations: SERIAC, AIA, TICCIH
- Website: glias.org.uk

The Greater London Industrial Archaeology Society (GLIAS) is the industrial archaeology society for the Greater London area.

== Origins and Responsibilities ==
Founded in 1968 by individuals who had been involved in the Thames Valley Observation Group, it quickly established itself as the leading industrial archaeological and industrial history group in the London area.

The society is a member of the South East Regional Industrial Archaeological Conference, the Association for Industrial Archaeology, and the TICCIH. It also works together with more locally directed history groups and projects supporting individual conservation projects, as well as raising industrial historical issues with national UK organisations such as English Heritage and the Royal Fine Art Commission.

In addition it comments on planning applications and developments likely to have an effect on the preservation and survival of industrial structures. In this remit it acts as a statutory consultee.

Its membership is crossed with many other similar organisations and bodies that have similar objectives such as the King's Cross Conservation Area Advisory Committee, the Newcomen Society and the Association for Industrial Archaeology.

== Activities ==
Every year it organises a series of half-a-dozen lectures (held in Central London) on industrial archaeology. It provides a bi-monthly newsletter, originally produced as hard copy in an A4 Gestetner form but now printed conventionally. It also hosts a series of popular walks around sites of industrial archaeological importance in London, usually led by people who are expert about the areas in question.

An occasional journal is produced in A4 booklet form.

== Database ==
In the early 1990s AIA developed a national standardised method for collecting industrial archaeology data. The result was the IRIS (Index Record for Industrial Sites) booklet and forms, published in 1993.

In 1998, GLIAS began to develop a database which could be used to record site information in Greater London. The intention was to make the database compatible with the IRIS data standard, and the first version was essentially an electronic IRIS form.

An early version was demonstrated to a special committee of the society, the Recording Group, and this was later presented to the AIA. This was favourably received and the database has been in development ever since. In 2002 the society received an award from the AIA.

The GLIAS database is now hosted by the Industrial History Online database
