= Wessex Mills Group =

Small non-profit society formed in 2003

Wessex Mills Group is a small non-profit society formed in June 2003 to act as a centre for the wind and watermill heritage of the counties of Devon, Dorset, Somerset and Wiltshire in the United Kingdom. It sees itself as complementary to existing local organisations such as the local industrial archaeology societies of its area. The Group draws its membership from a wide range of people, from those with a professional link with mills (including mill owners) to those with a general amateur interest. The Group meets regularly and publishes a quarterly newsletter.
