= Charcoal Kilns =

Charcoal Kilns may refer to:

- Walker Charcoal Kiln, Arizona
- Wildrose charcoal kilns, Death Valley National Park, California
- Cottonwood Charcoal Kilns, Owens Lake, California
- Birch Creek Charcoal Kilns, Leadore, Idaho; listed on the National Register of Historic Places as "Charcoal Kilns"
- Charcoal Kilns (Eureka, Utah), listed on the National Register of Historic Places
- Piedmont Charcoal Kilns, Wyoming

== See also ==
- Charcoal
- Kiln
