= Étançon mine =

One of the main mines of the Ronchamp coal mines

Étançon mine n° 13 bis
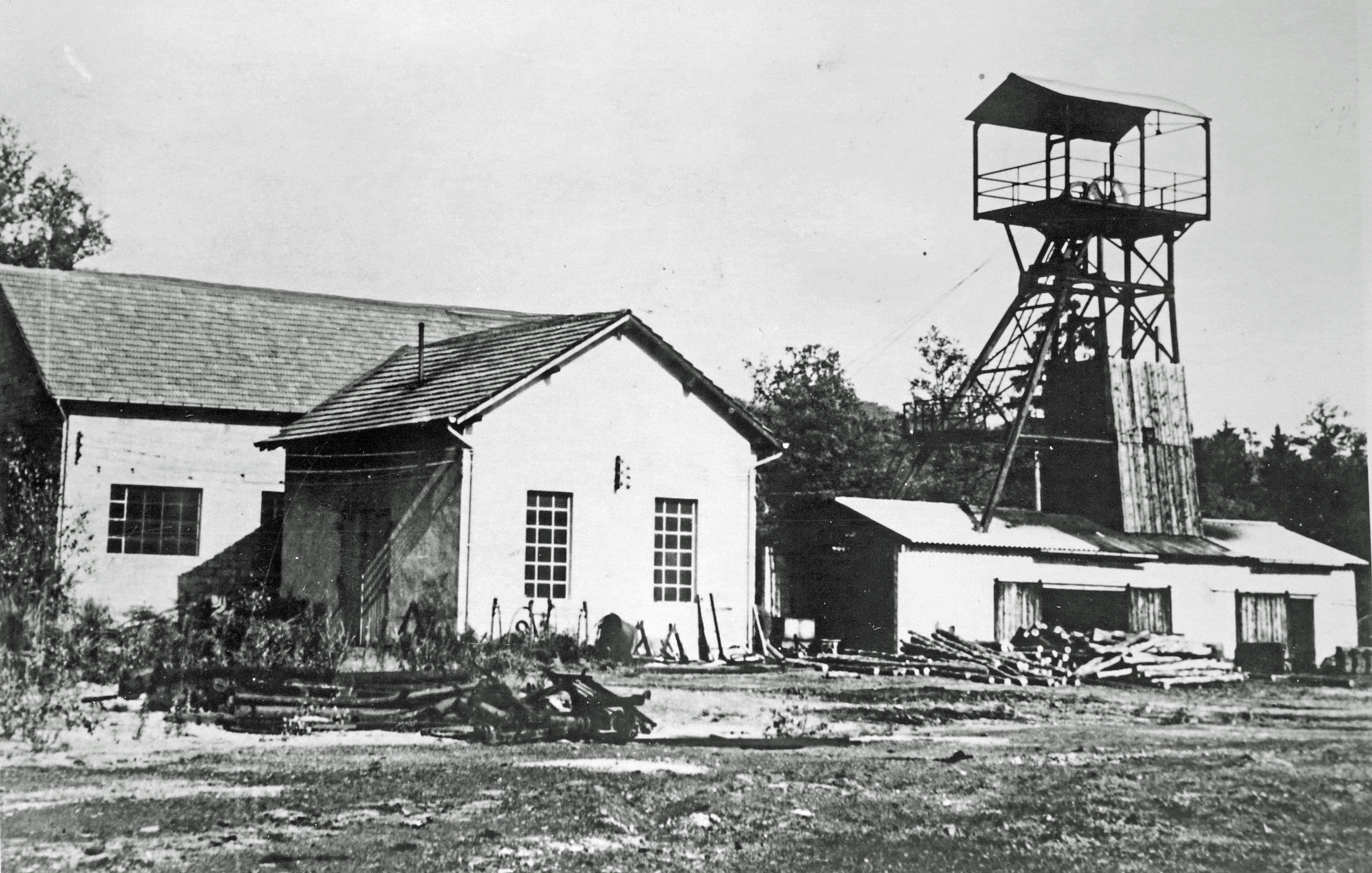
- The Etançon mine in operation in the 1950s.

- Location within Bourgogne-Franche-Comté Location within France
- Location: Bourgogne-Franche-Comté Haute-Saône department Ronchamp commune; 47°42′33″N 6°38′46″E
- Products: Bituminous coal
- Greatest depth: 44 meters
- Discovered: 1949
- Opened: 1950
- Closed: 1958
- Company: Ronchamp coal mines

The Etançon mine (or n° 13 bis mine) is one of the main mines of the Ronchamp coal mines, in the commune of Ronchamp, in the Burgundy-Franche-Comté region of France. It is the only mine in the coalfield dug in the 20th century, and also the only one dug by Électricité de France. It operated from 1950 to 1958, when the outcrops were brought back into production. By extending mining for a further ten years, it made it easier for miners to retire.

After its closure, it was dismantled and left to fall into disrepair before being incorporated into the outcrop footpath in 1997. Between 1999 and 2000, the site was cleared by an association, before becoming an industrial tourism site at the beginning of the 21st century.

== Situation before excavation ==
When the French coal industry was nationalized in 1946, the Ronchamp coalfield was entrusted to Électricité de France, as it was too far from other major coalfields and had a large thermal power station. The impoverishment of the deposit and its low profitability led to research being carried out at coal outcrops, in particular where a first layer had already been mined by old workings with galleries, but where a second layer had been disdained for lack of technical resources. This led to the decision to dig the Etançon shaft.

== Excavation ==
In June 1947, four sondages were drilled in the Étançon sector, identifying the second coal layer at a depth of between 10 and 20 metres. In July 1949, it became necessary to dig a mine shaft at l'Etançon, as the downhill drifts exploiting the area were getting longer and deeper. The company dug borehole no. 13 to identify suitable ground for the shaft, but only encountered old workings. The neighbouring borehole, no. 13 bis, encountered a layer of 50 and 30 cm thick benches.

The mine itself was dug between 1949 and 1950. Masonry work began in January 1950, and the mine had a circular cross-section with a diameter of 3.2 metres. Receipt was established at a depth of 38 metres, and the total depth of the shaft was 44 metres, with a 5-metre sump.

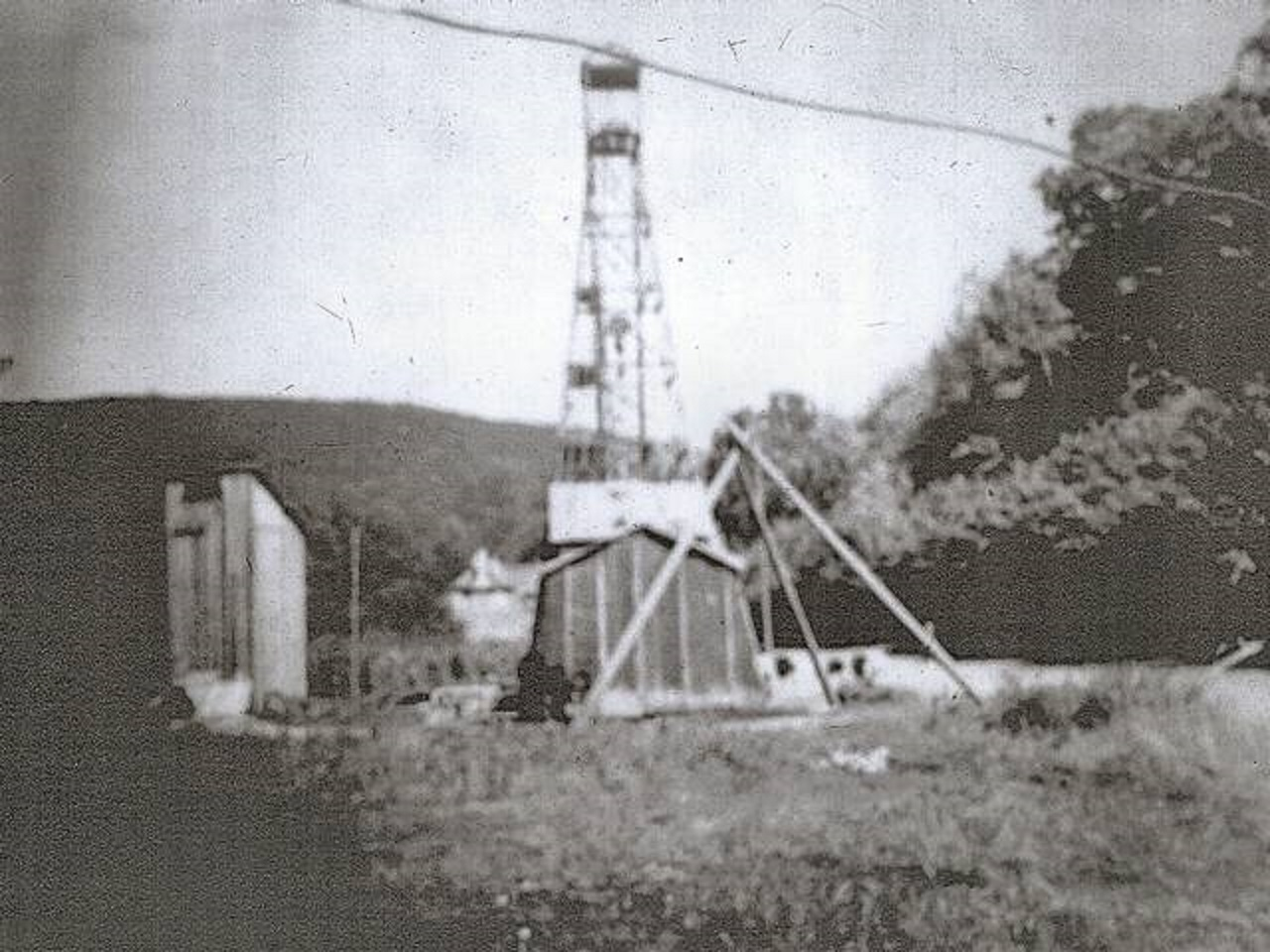
One of the 1947 sondages.

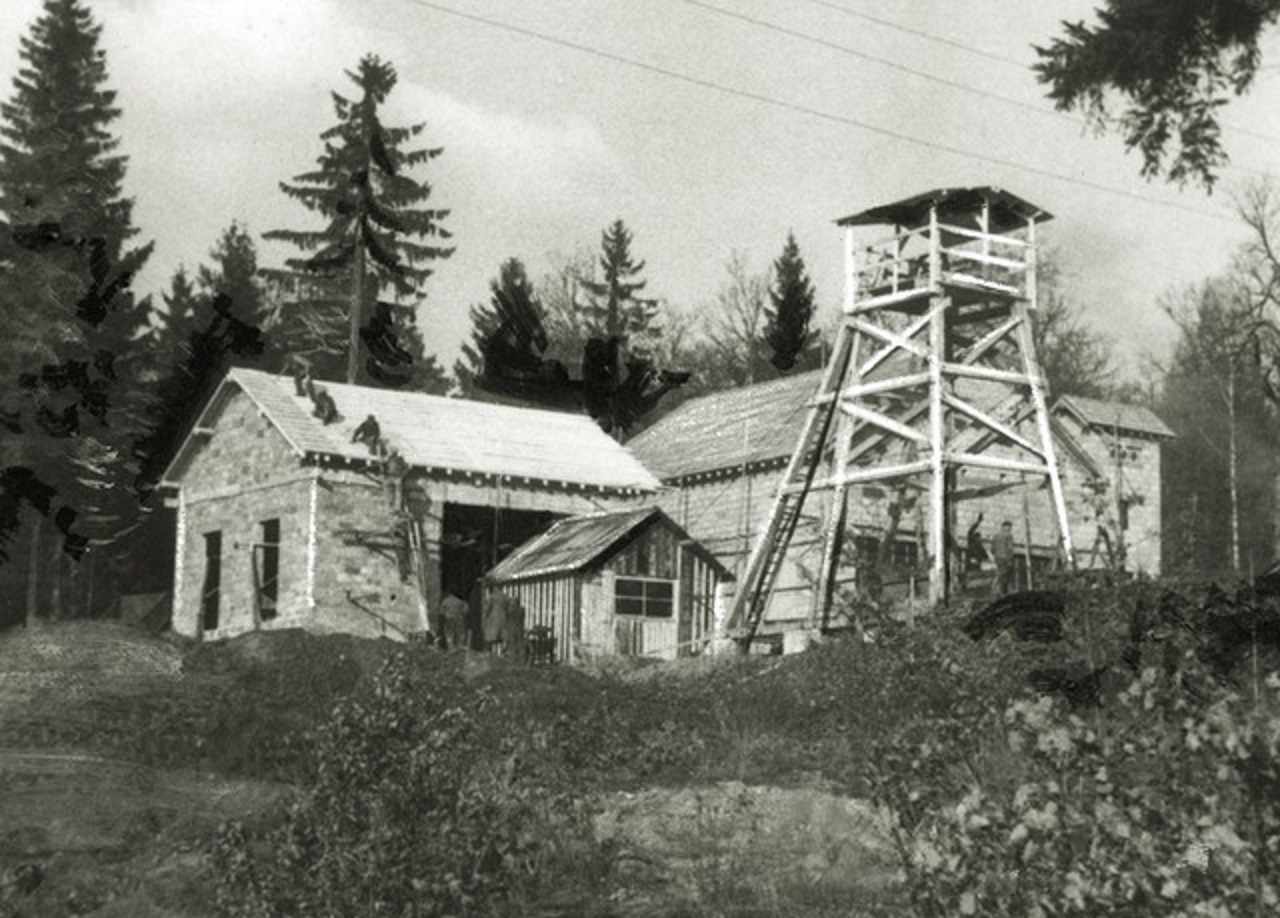
Temporary wooden headframe (1949).

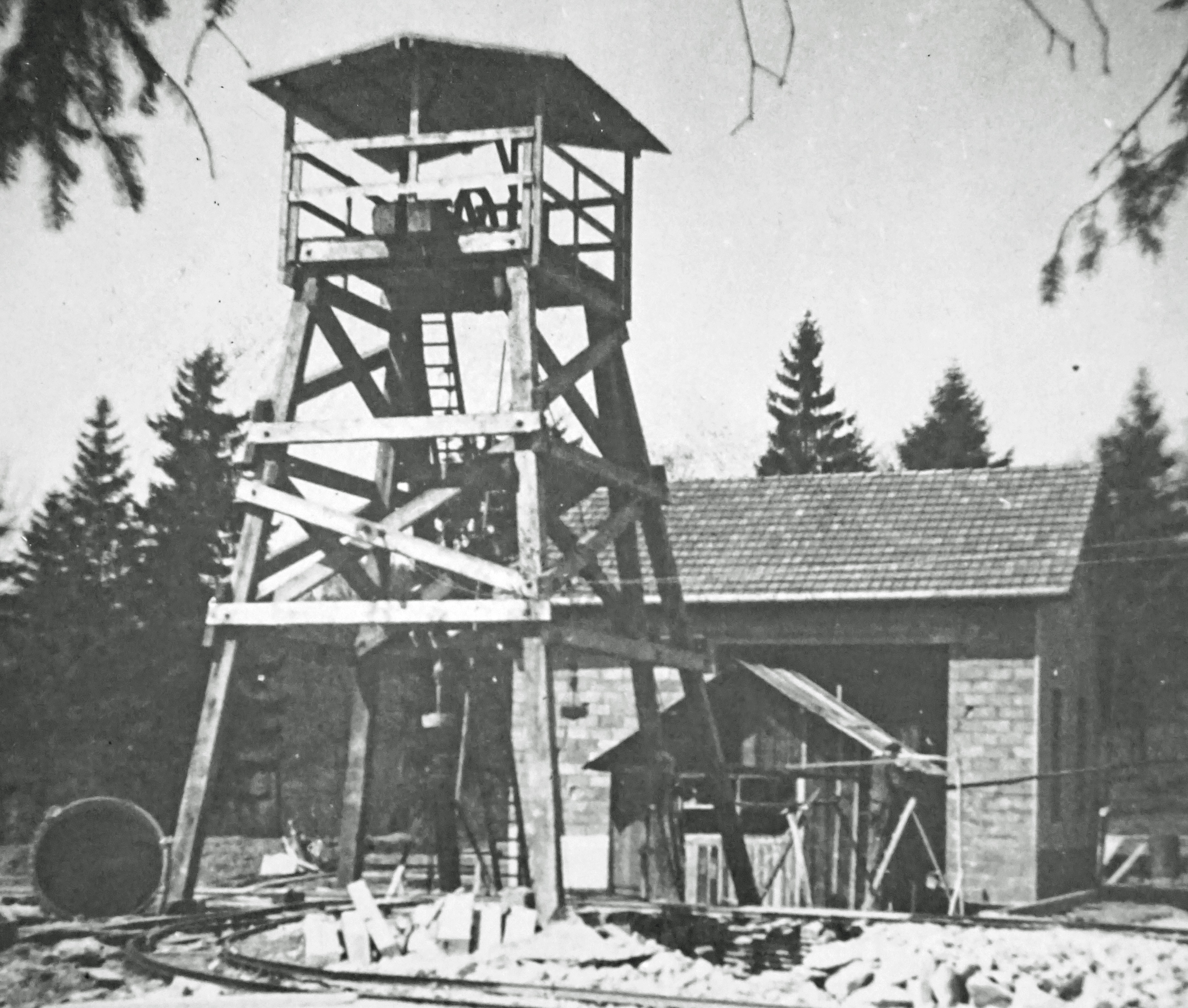
Another view of the temporary headframe.

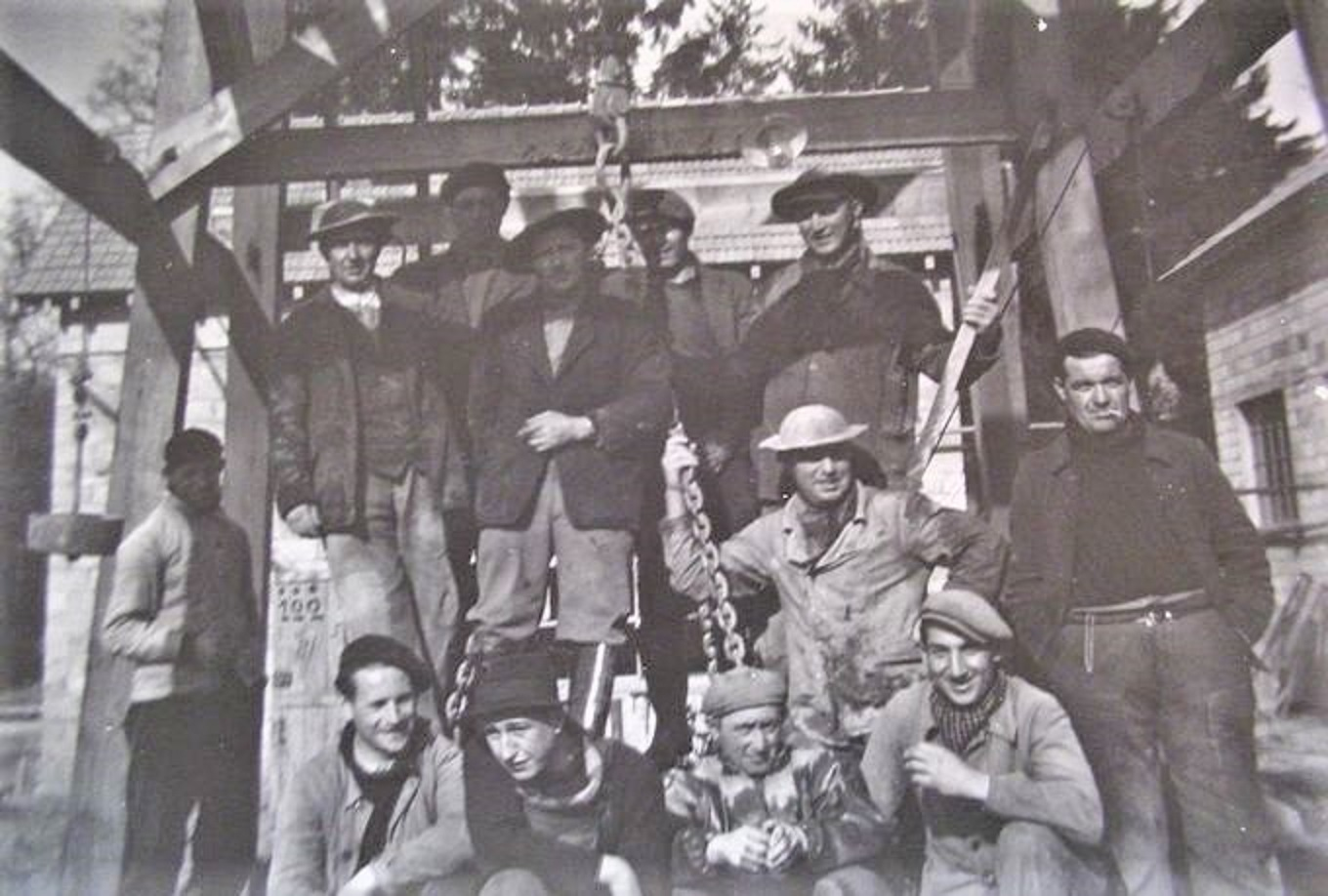
The excavation team and the masons.

== Above-ground installations ==
Plan of the mine facilities: 1. compressed air tanks; 2. compressors building; 3. extraction machine building; 4. receipt building; 5. mine shafts; A. compressors; B. extraction machine; C. trestle.

The pit was initially equipped with a wooden trestle fitted with a cuff.

The definitive metal headframe was built in June 1950. It was fitted with the wheels and the winding engine (electric hoist) from the Sainte-Marie coal mine. Two buildings surrounded the shaft: the winch building and the building housing the two air compressors (one of which came from the Chanois coal mine, which was at the end of its working life). Another building to the north, near several gallery entrances, housed the changing rooms, showers and blacksmith's workshop. In November 1955, the Chanois shaft's muffler valve was added, along with a cage depth indicator.

== Operation ==
An electric pump was used to remove the water that had invaded the bottom of the shaft and prevented work from starting. Once the shafts were cleared, a bowette was dug in the direction of the East drift and the Fourchie gallery (two descents).

On December 16, 1950, the mine's last fatal accident occurred in the base gallery of the Fourchie tunnel. Four people were killed. At the time of the accident, the link with this gallery had not yet been completed. It was completed in 1951, when excavation of the "Jolain" shaft began.

Coal extracted from the shaft and nearby outcrop galleries was transported to the Le Chanois center by dump trucks.

Mining finally ceased in April 1958. By extending mining operations over ten years, the Etançon shaft made it easier for miners to retire, giving them more time to reclassify or retire as the Ronchamp coal mines phased out its operations.

== Conversion ==
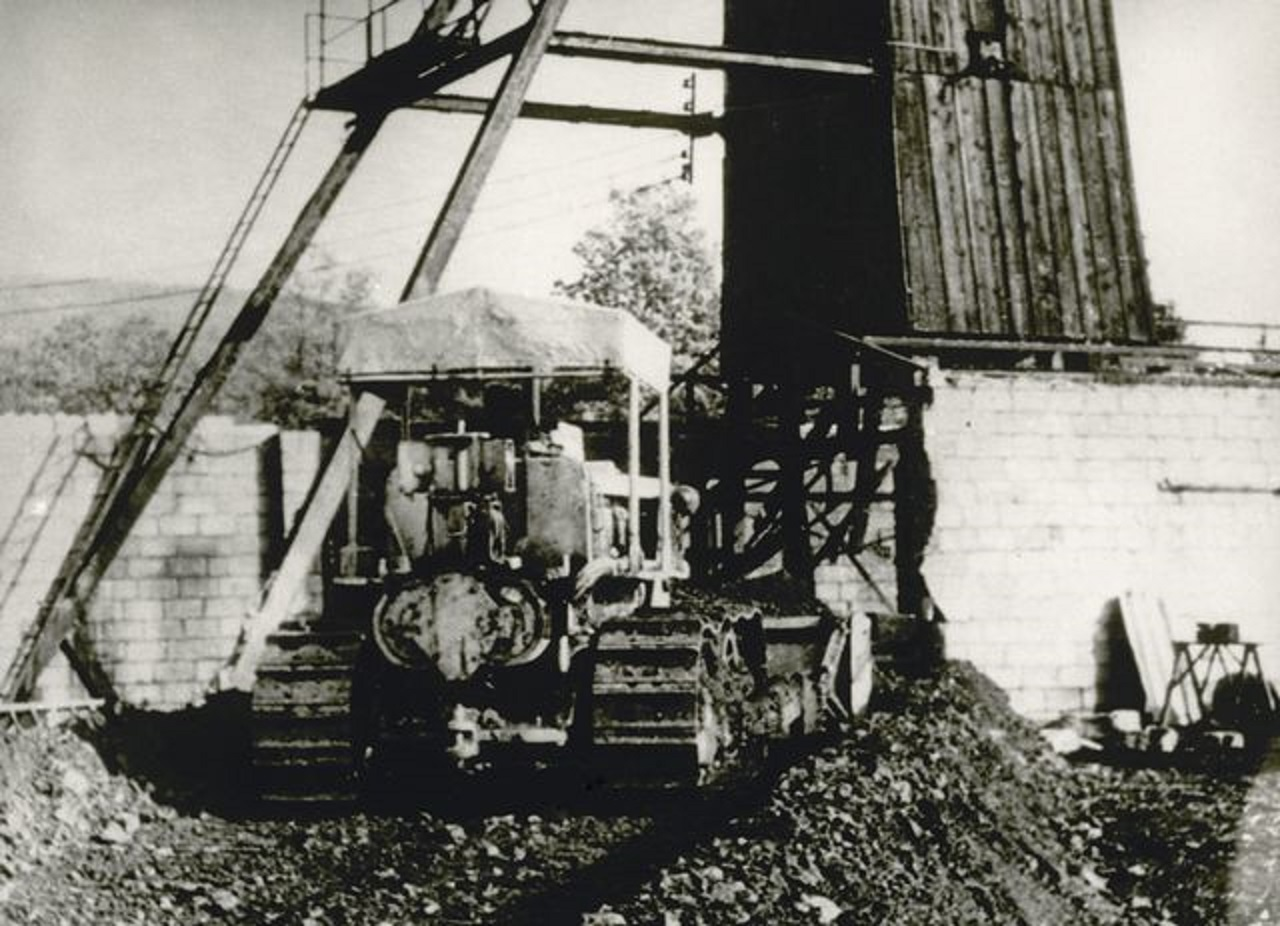
Backfilling the shaft in 1959.

The shaft closed permanently in September 1958 and was backfilled the following year. As with the other shafts in the coalfield, a concrete slab was then poured with a marker indicating the name, usable diameter and depth. The installations were dismantled and the buildings demolished before the vegetation reclaimed the site. In 1997, the shaft site was rediscovered and integrated into the Etançon historical and mining circuit. It is now also part of the Étançon and mining towns hiking trail created by the Ballons des Vosges Nature Park.

From 1999 to 2000, the site was cleared by the Friends of the Mining Museum. The foundations of the old buildings were uncovered and the mine shaft was dug back a few metres. A stele paying tribute to the four victims of the Etançon was raised. The site became a place of remembrance and industrial tourism. In 2007 and again in 2008, the site welcomed new additions (a locomotive, minecarts and two restored and repainted fans from the Grozon gypsum mines).

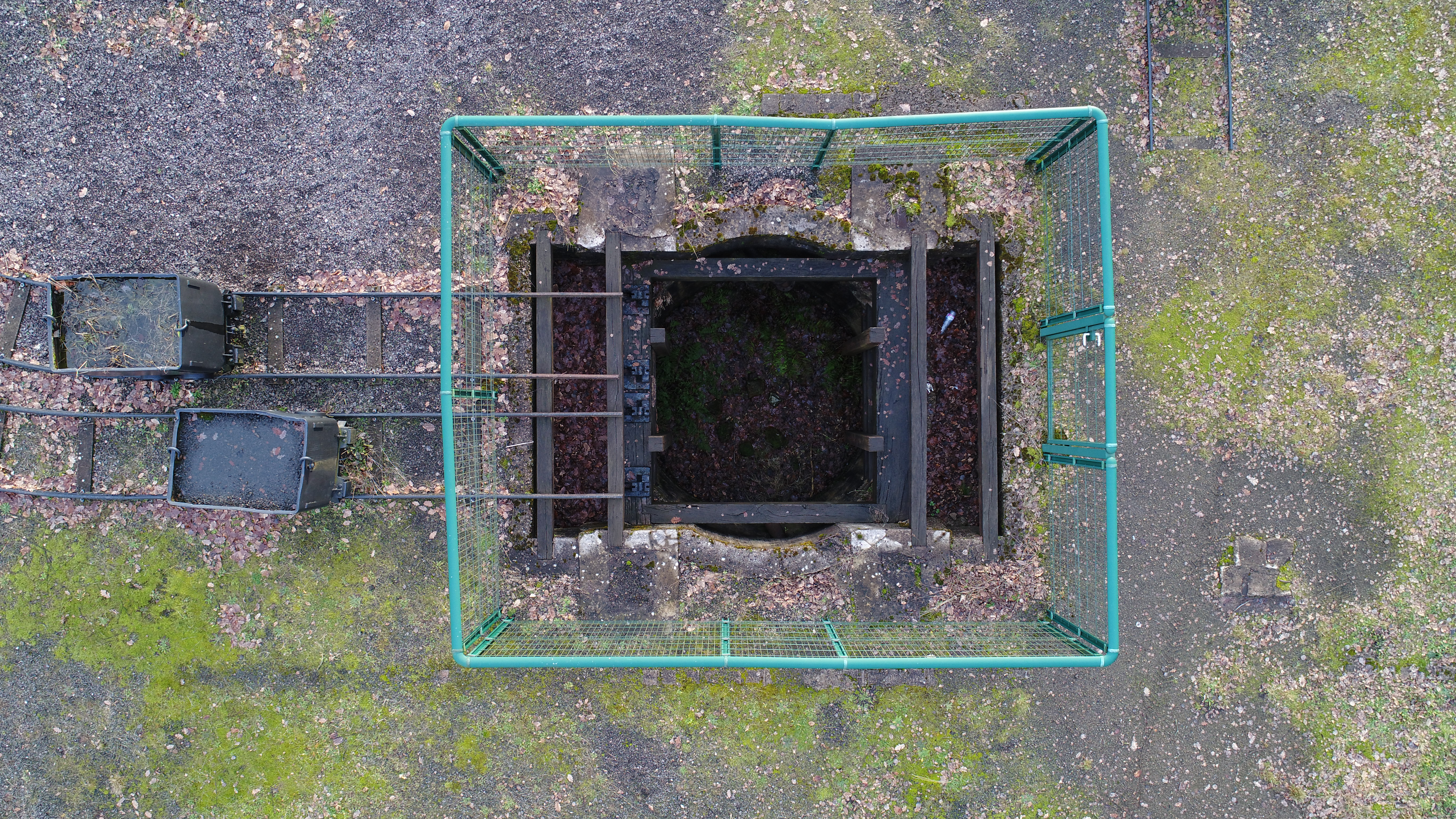
Aerial view

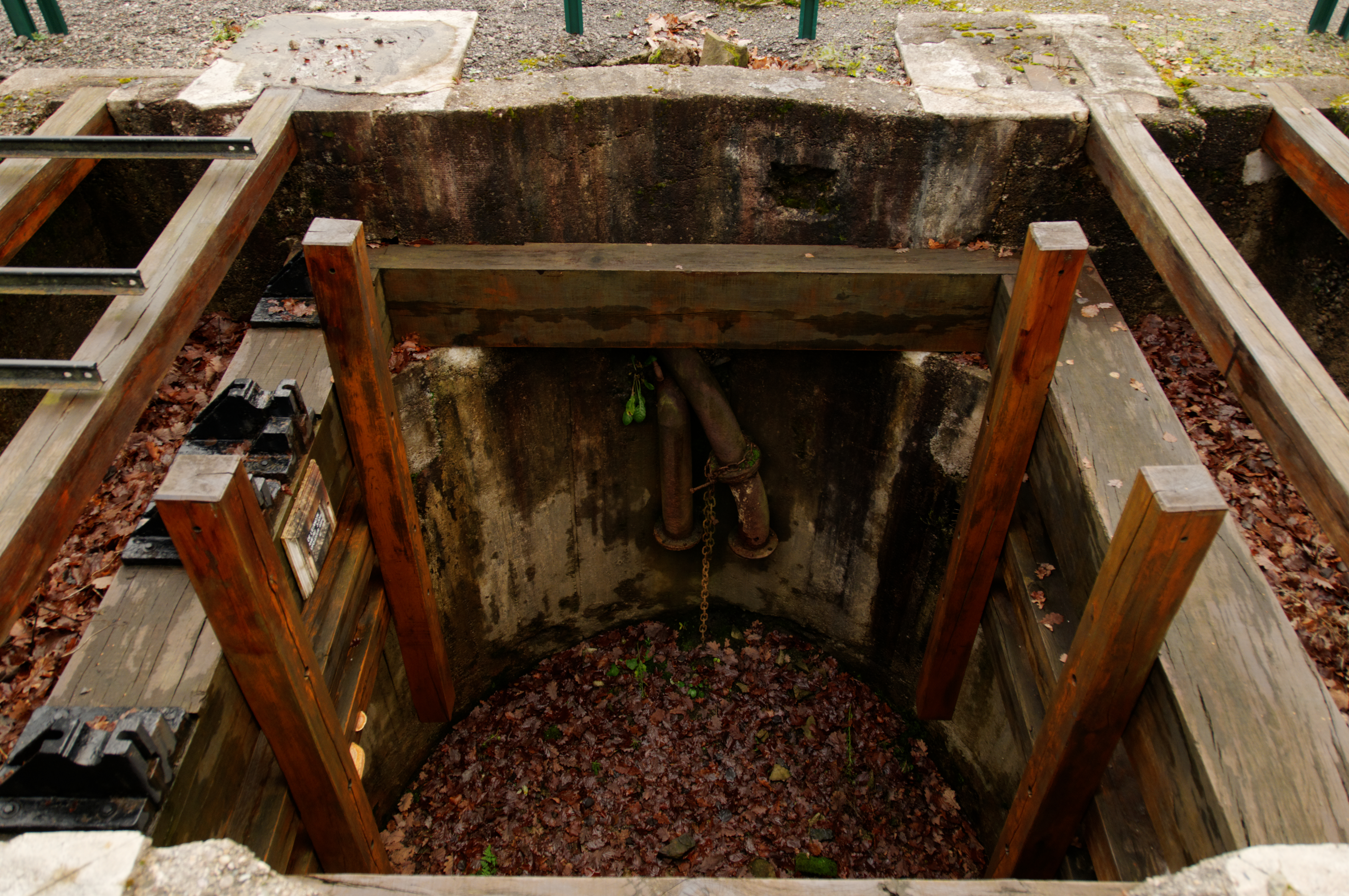
Étançon mine shafts structure.

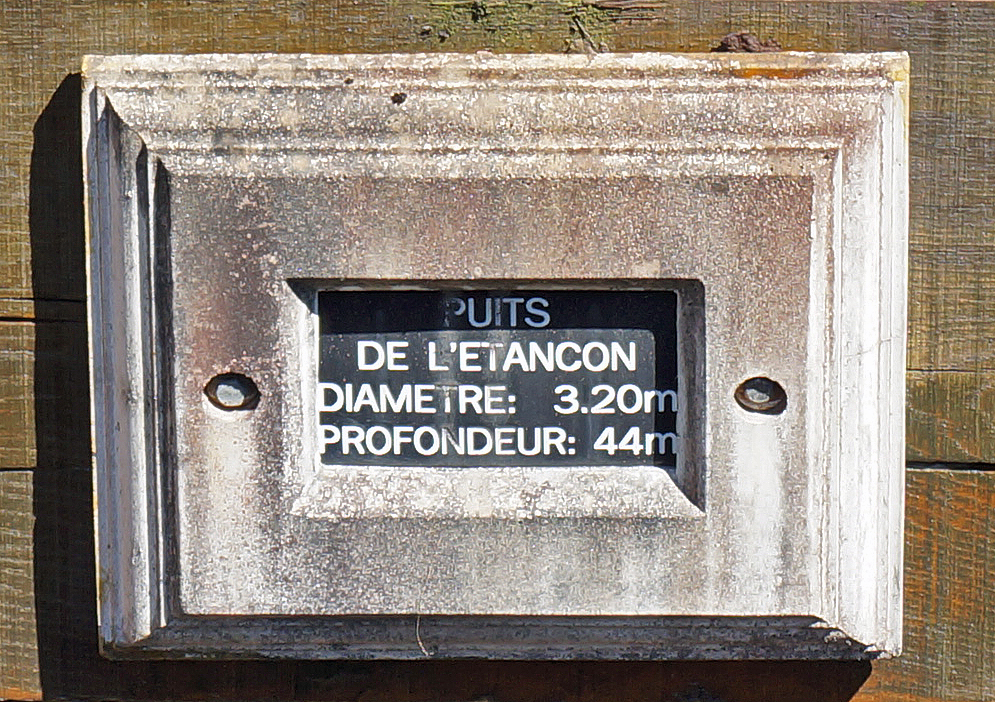
Inscriptions on the mine shaft.

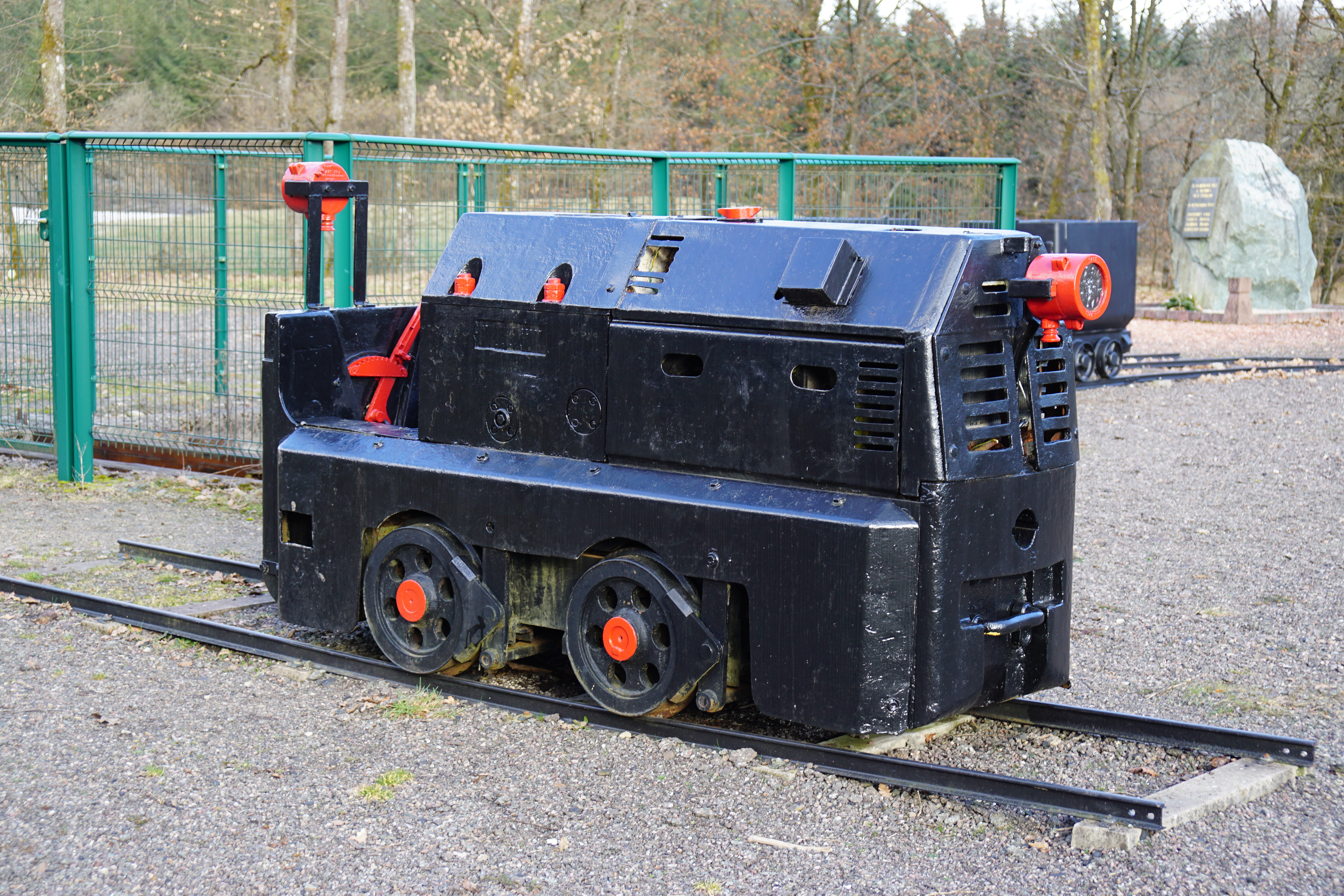
The locomotive added in 2008.
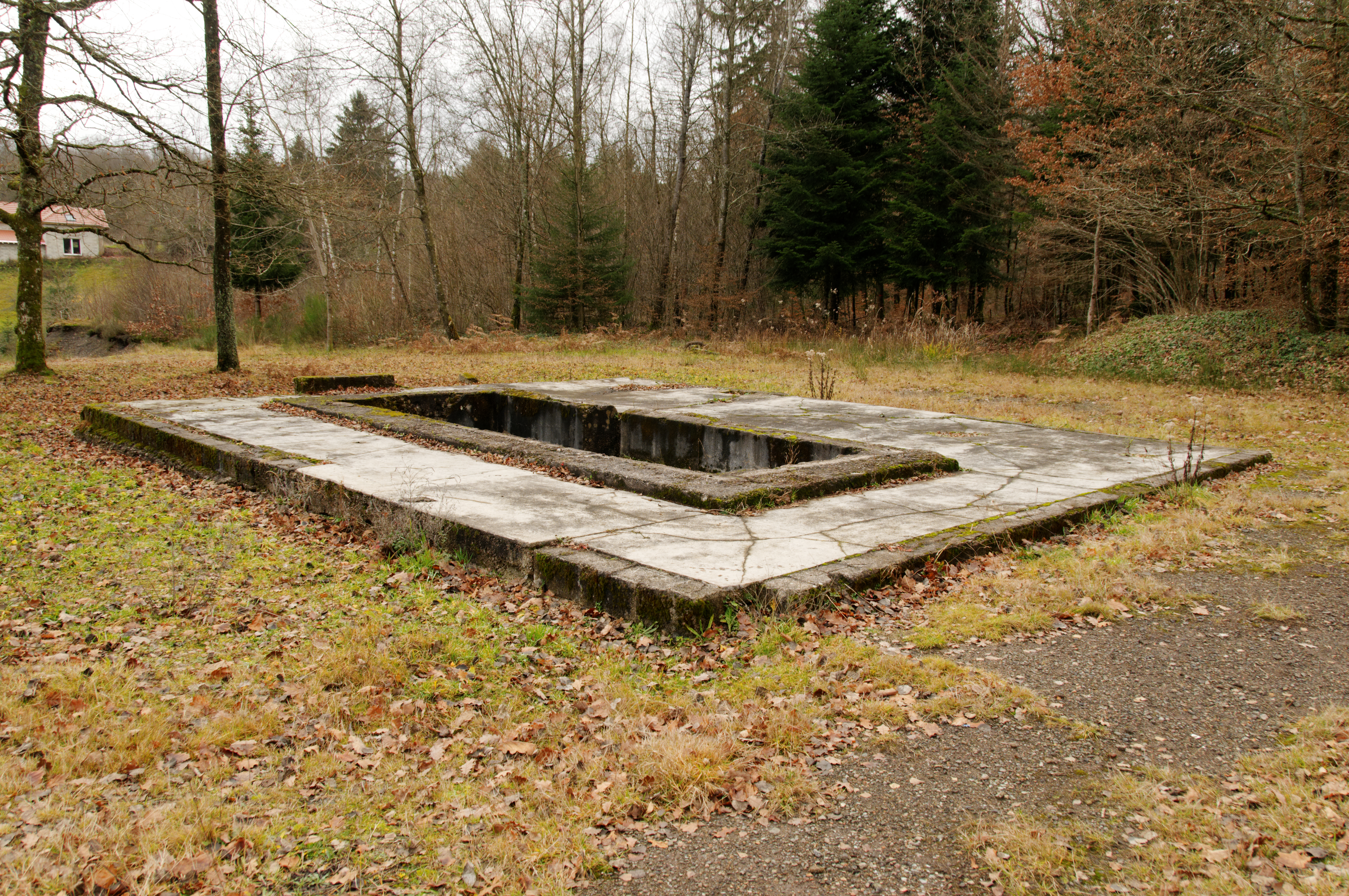
The old extraction machine building.

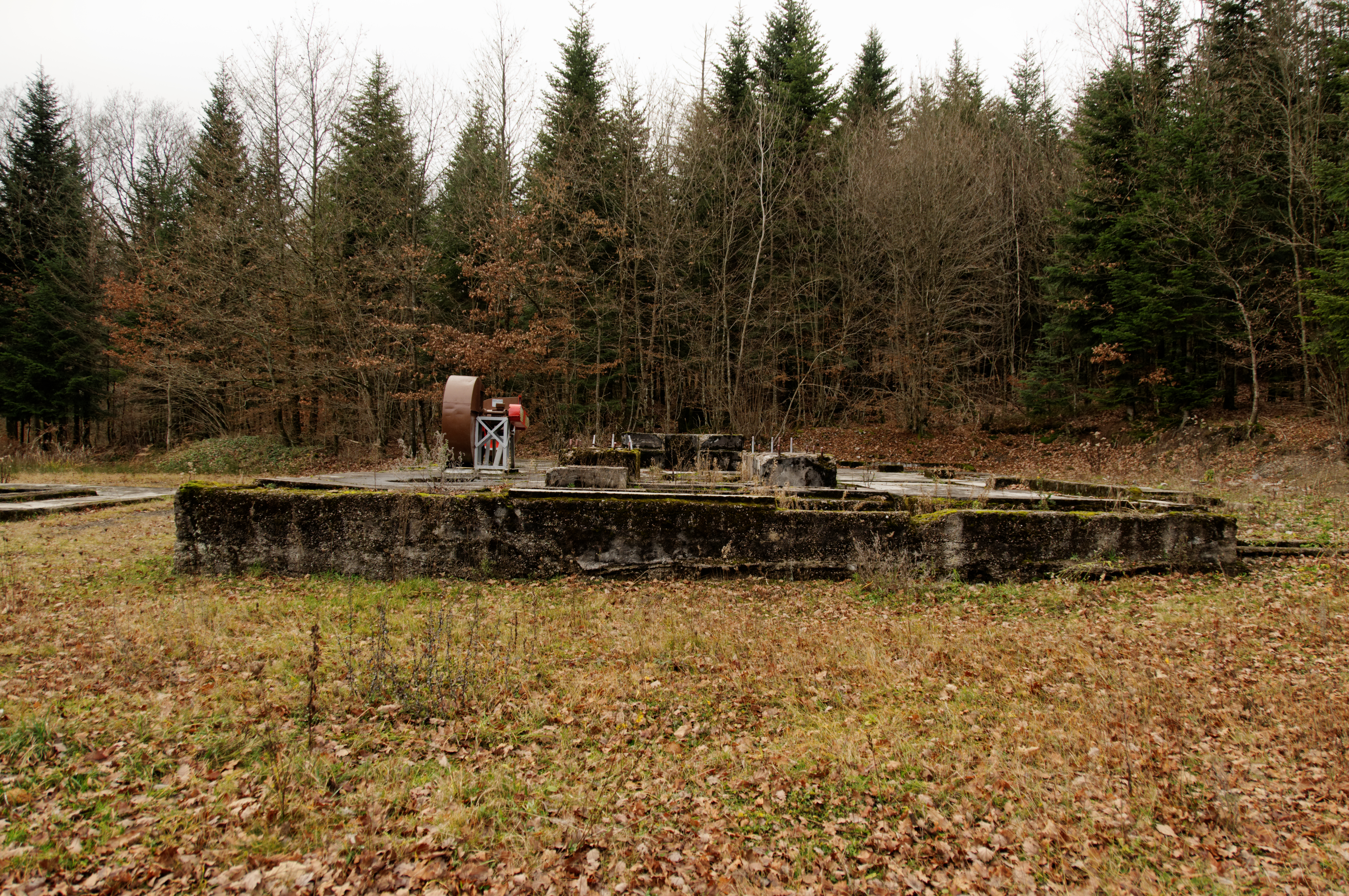
Remains of the compressors building.

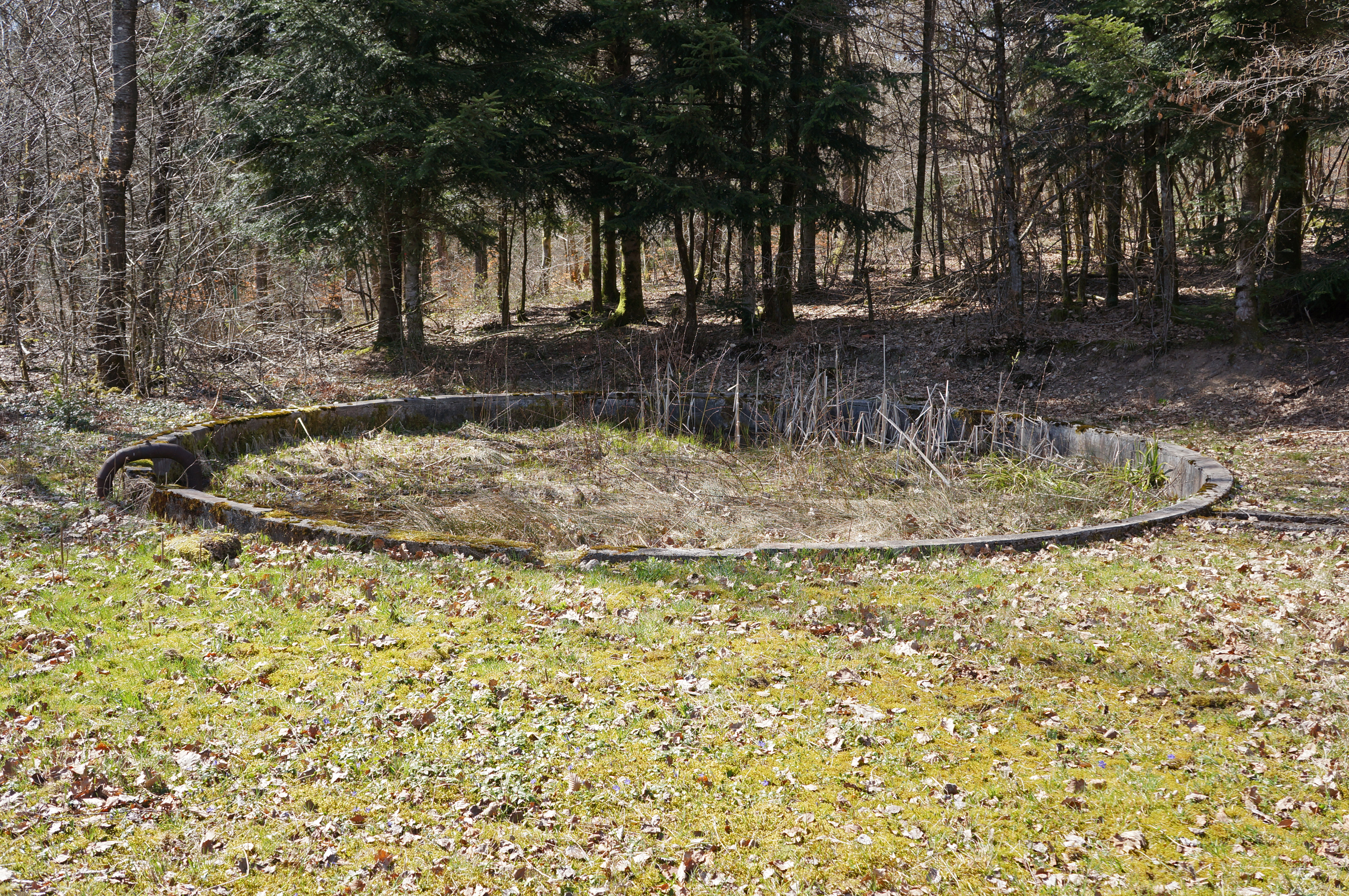
Remains of the settling tank.

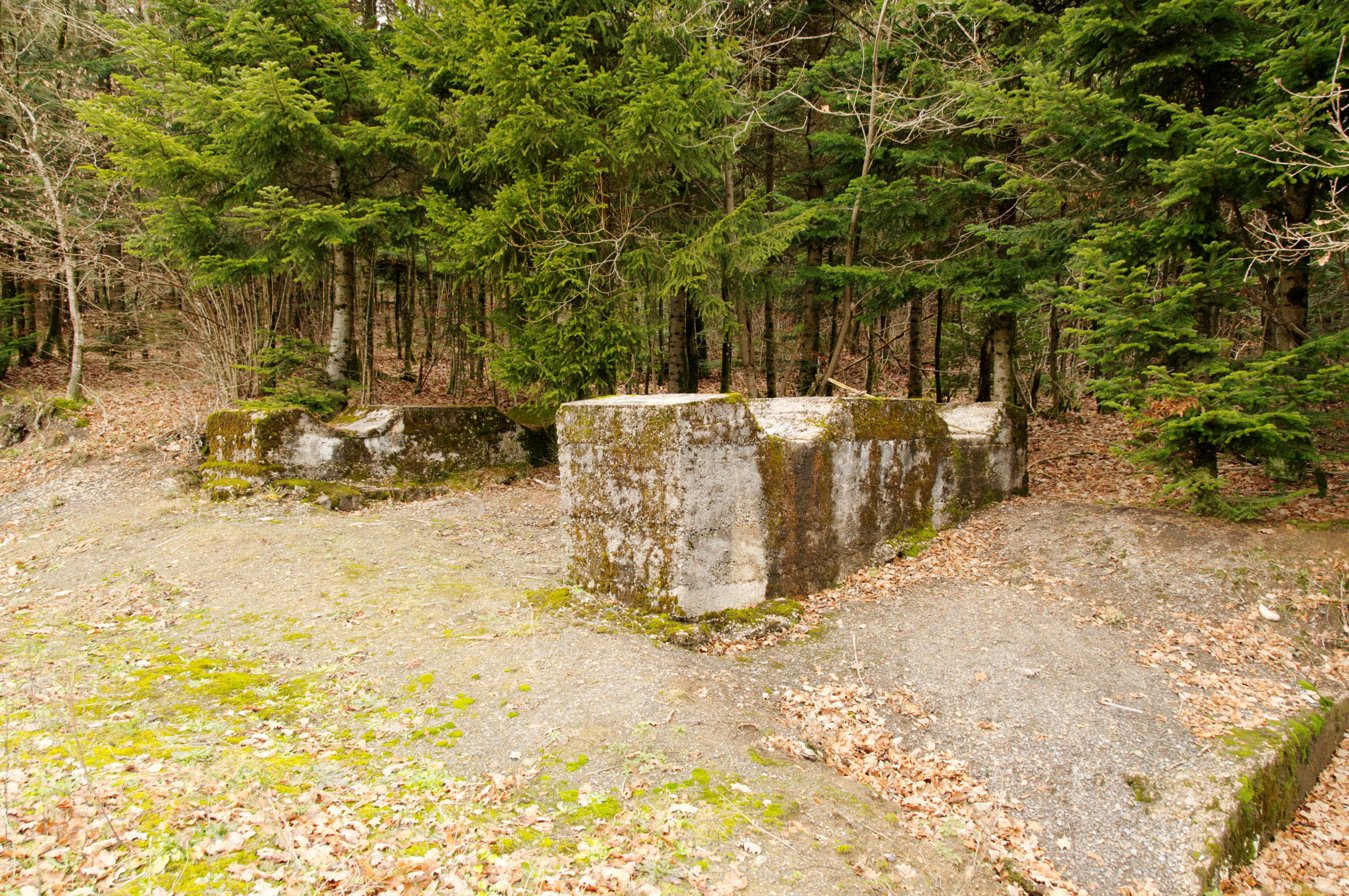
Compressed air tank supports.

== The spoil tip ==
The Etançon mine is surrounded by a small, flat spoil tip, formed lengthwise on the side of a natural undulation and it is situated at 47.708946°N 6.64543°E. In 2000, the SMPM association carried out an inventory of mycoflora on the Chanois and Etançon spoil tips. Several rare species were discovered, including Pisolithus arhizus, Lactarius fuscus and Stropharia rugosoannulata, demonstrating the importance of conserving these spoil heaps. On June 19, 2007, the Ronchamp town council officially announced the conservation of the Étançon slag heap and the north-western part of the Chanois plain spoil tips.

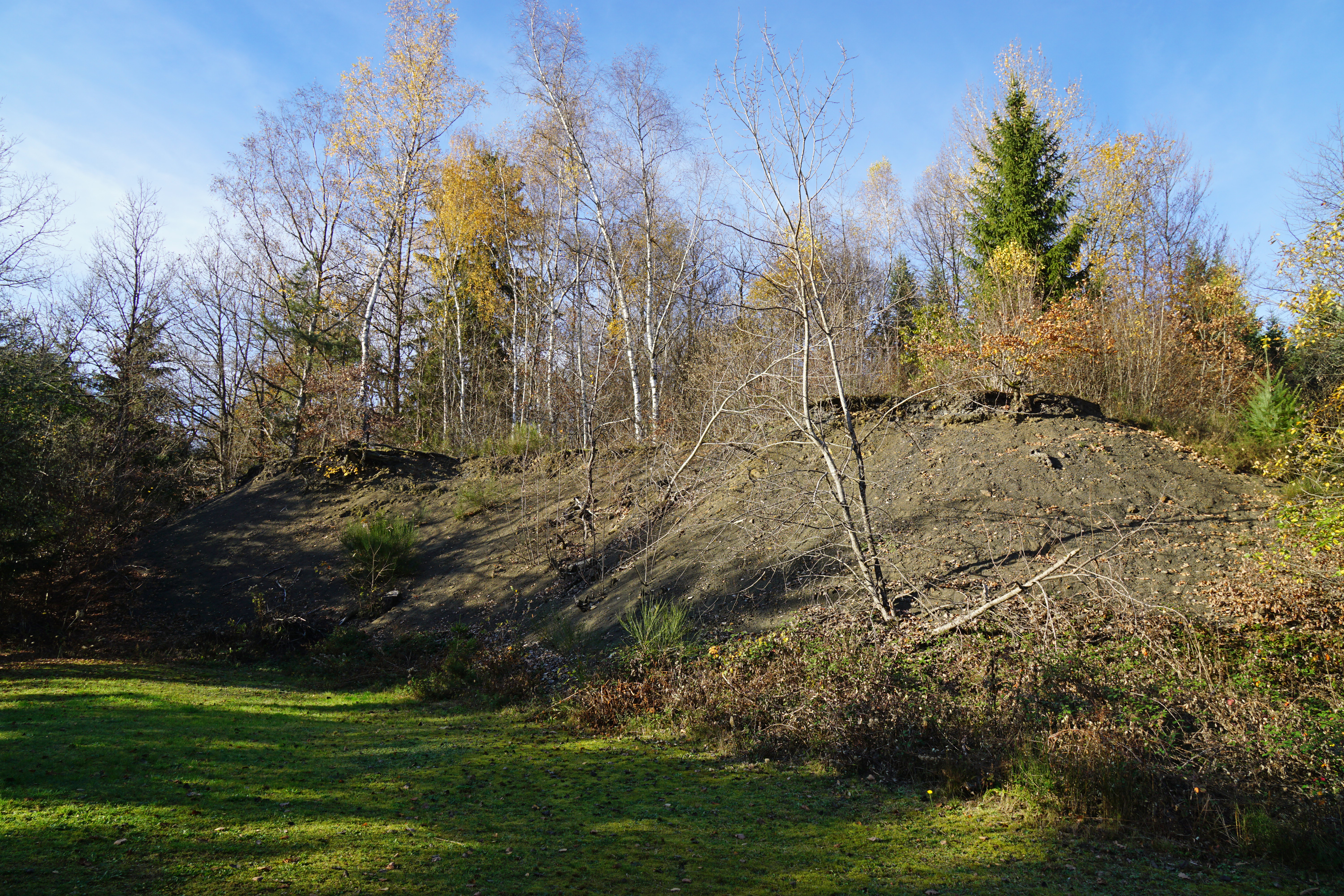

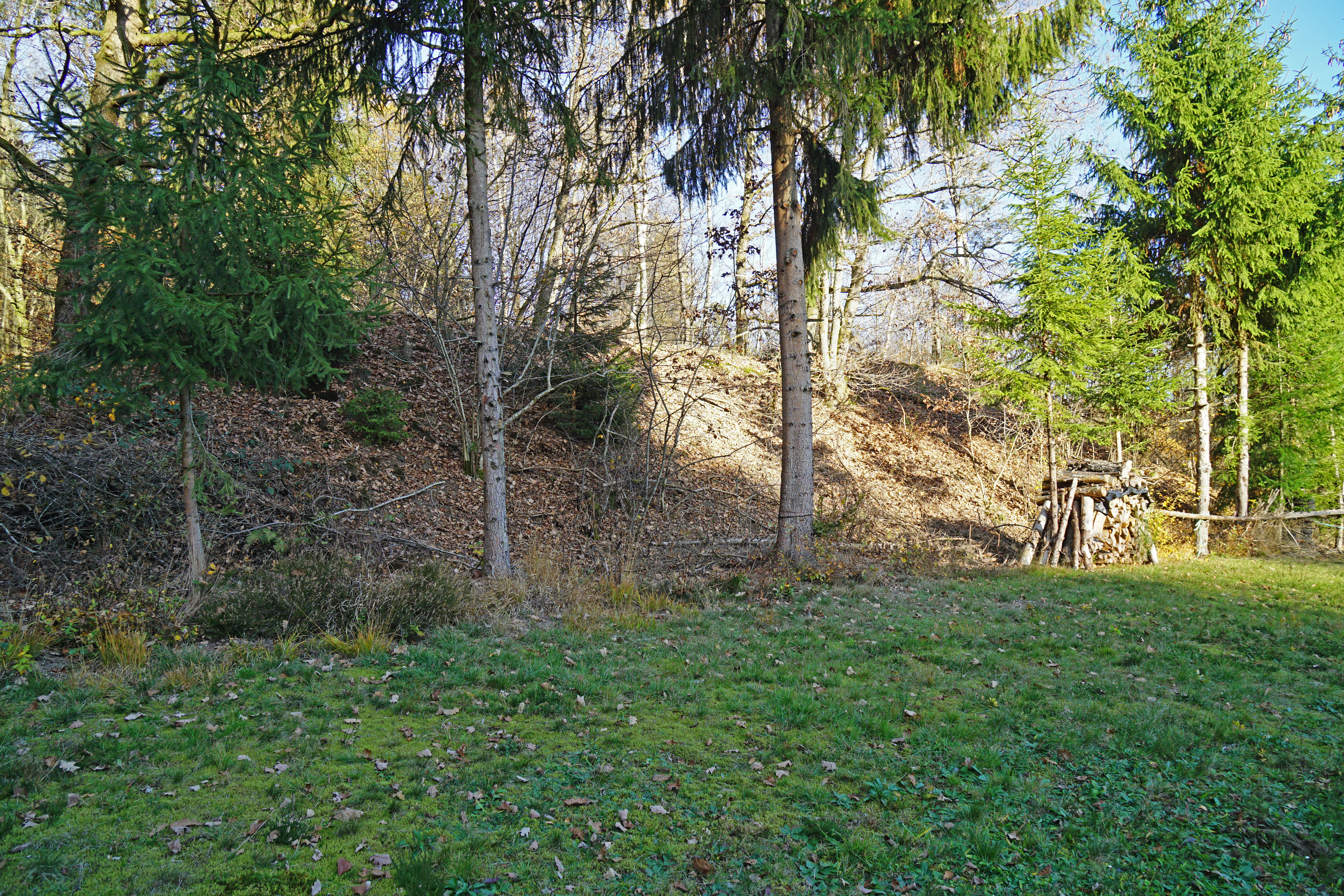

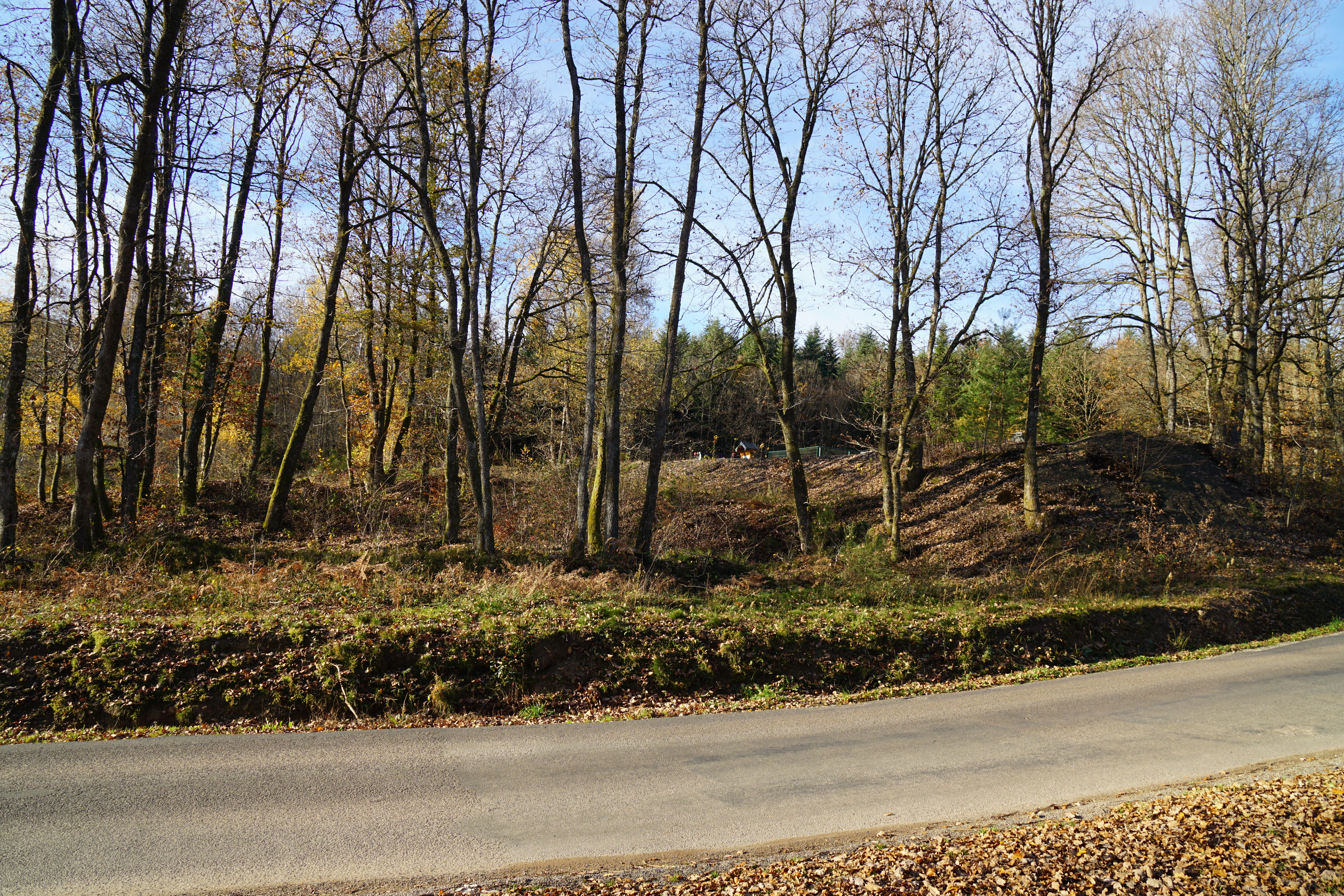

== See also ==
- Ronchamp coal mines

== Bibliography ==
- Parietti, Jean-Jacques (2001). Les Houillères de Ronchamp (in French). Vol. 1. Vesoul: Éditions Comtoises. ISBN 2-914425-08-2. BNF: 39116001s.
- Parietti, Jean-Jacques (2010). Les Houillères de Ronchamp (in French). Vol. 2. Noidans-lès-Vesoul: Franche-Comté culture & patrimoine. ISBN 978-2-36230-001-1.
- Parietti, Jean-Jacques (2017). Le puits de l'Étançon. Les dossiers de la Houillère (in French). Ronchamp: Association des amis du musée de la mine.
- Parietti, Jean-Jacques; Petitot, Christiane (2005). Géomètre aux houillères de Ronchamp (in French). Association des amis du musée de la mine.
- PNRBV (1999). Le charbon de Ronchamp (in French). Déchiffrer le patrimoine, Parc naturel régional des Ballons des Vosges. ISBN 978-2-910328-31-3.
