= Industrial tourism =

Visits to sites of industrial development

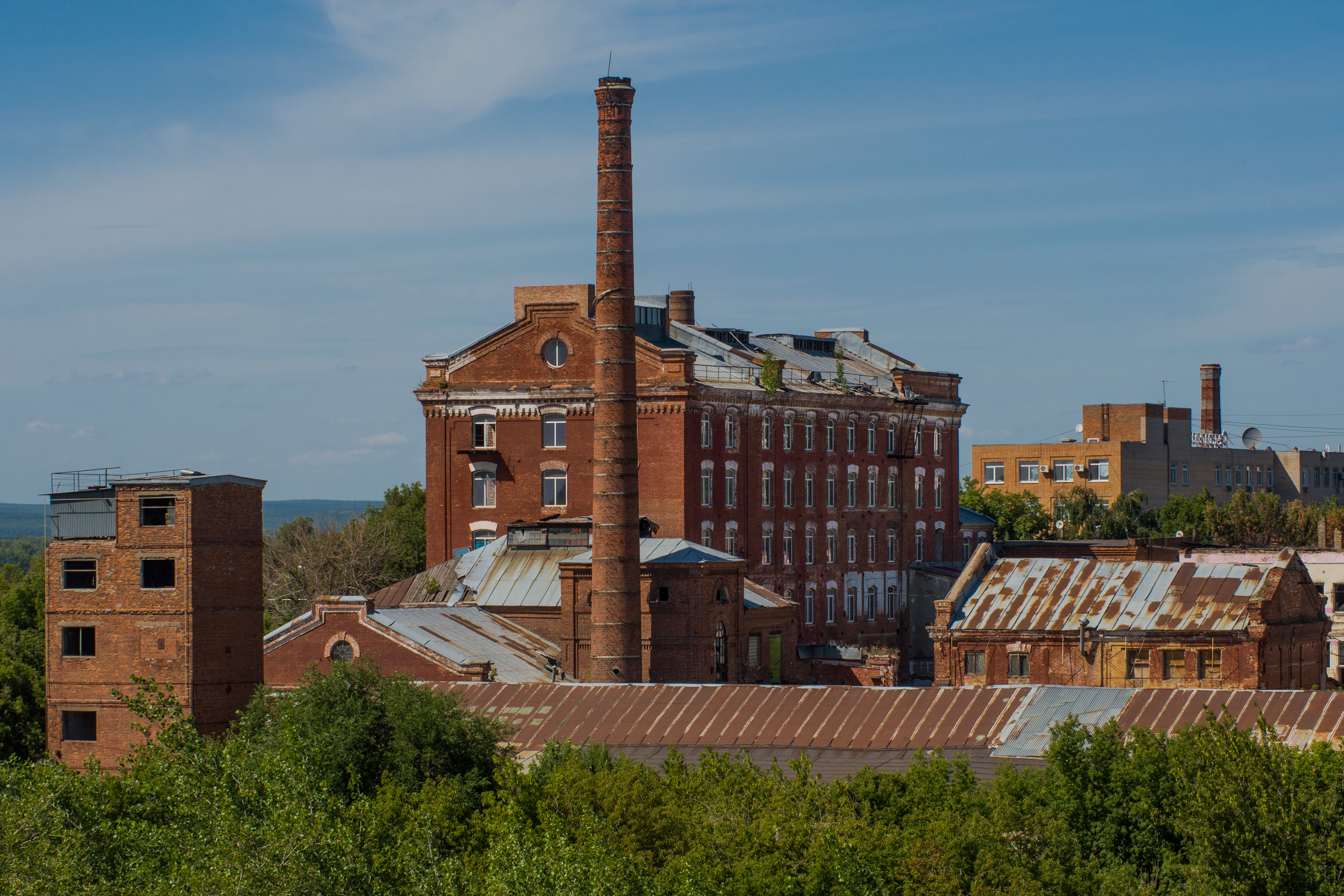
An old flour mill in Samara, Russia

Industrial tourism is tourism in which the desired destination includes industrial sites peculiar to a particular location. The concept is not new, as it includes wine tours in France, visits to cheesemakers in the Netherlands, Jack Daniel's distillery tours in the United States for example, but has taken on renewed interest in recent times, with both industrial heritage sites and modern industry attracting tourism.

== Attractiveness ==
Even if the concept is subjective, depending on a person's preferences, it has been noticed (through market researches) that people like to see and experience the present or historic (heritage) production processes of:

- goods with a symbolic character for a region (from coal and energy in Ruhr, to bananas and coffee in Guatemala);
- branded, luxury goods like cars, watches and jewels;
- technologically demanding, innovative goods like computers and airplanes;
- handcrafted goods like porcelain and blacksmith products;
- drinks and foods.

An attractions directory for some Central SE European countries illustrates and includes this classification.

The attractiveness perception is also influenced by the cities' of destination ability to build touristic packages that reflect their industrial image and/or identity; respectively, in the case of tour operators, by mastering the industrial component in their attraction mix in the offered packages.

Presently, even on the mature markets, there are relatively few tour operators providing industrial tourism packages, completing other offers and almost always missing the specialized ones, as researched in a market study conducted by one of the tour operators providing such specialized services.

The Society for Industrial Archeology and Association for Industrial Archaeology promote the preservation of historic industrial sites.

== Destinations ==
The most obvious industrial tourism destinations are cities and regions with a solid industrial base. For them, industrial tourism is a potential growth sector that matches with their identity: the sector offers opportunities to strengthen their distinctiveness and image, notably by building onto their already existing assets.

However, successful achievements are few and mostly in the developed countries (in Western Europe - especially Germany, the United Kingdom, the Netherlands; as well as in the US and Japan) where a culture of leadership and collaboration between the different stakeholders at the community's governance level already exists.

Industrial tourism is also very developed in France, where it has been structured around the association Entreprise et Découverte, created in 2012. Three thousand five hundred visits attracted twenty million visitors in 2023. In Switzerland, the sector is growing, without being as developed as in France.

There is a positive trend in Central Europe (Austria, Hungary, the Czech Republic, Poland), China and India too.

Also, attention is being paid worldwide to reconvert economically collapsed mono industrial areas (especially mining and metallurgic ones) through industrial tourism: Krivoi Rog, Reșița and Petroșani).

Wind farms and other energy generation facilities including dams and retired nuclear power plants are increasingly popular sites for educational tours.

== Other uses for the term ==
Some environmental and conservation activists, such as writer Edward Abbey, have used the term industrial tourism to refer to commercialized tourism in protected natural areas, posing a threat to their ecology.

In his book, Desert Solitaire, Abbey wrote: "Industrial tourism is a threat to the national parks. But the chief victims of the system are the motorized tourists. They are being robbed and robbing themselves. So long as they are unwilling to crawl out of their cars, they will not discover the treasures of the national parks and will never escape the stress and turmoil of the urban–suburban complexes which they had hoped, presumably, to leave behind for a while."

In 2023, the United Nations Convention on Biological Diversity (COP15) highlighted commercial tourism as a threat to national parks.

In many countries in the Global North, there is a move away from the use of fossil fuels and the sites of industrial facilities are being used as a tourist attraction. Thus, tourism can be a game-changer in the sustainable transition process.
