= Industrial archaeology =

Archaeological sub-discipline

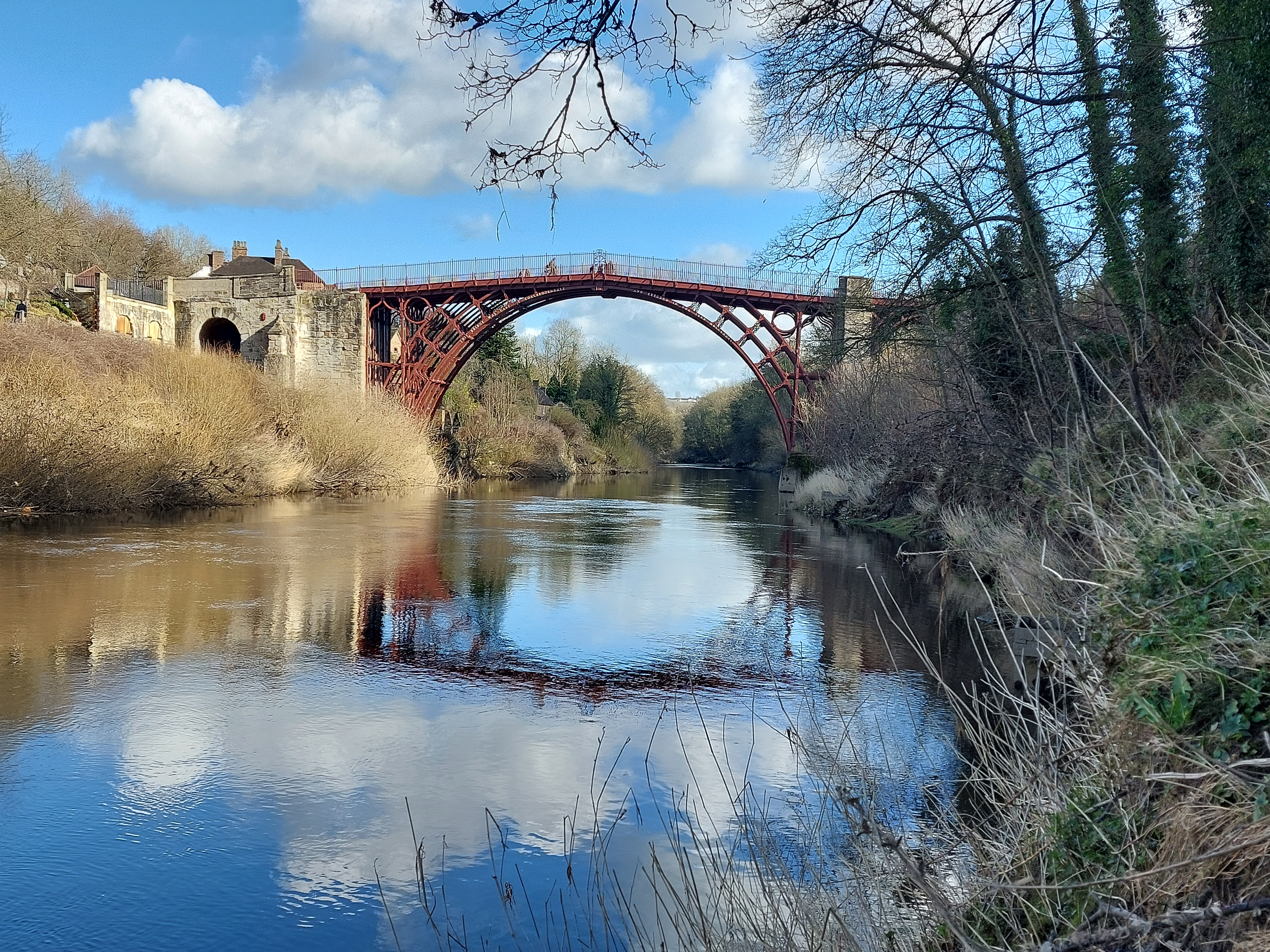
The Ironbridge Gorge, Shropshire, UK, was one of the first areas in the world to be part of a large-scale industrial archaeology study. In 1986, it was one of the first industrial sites to be named a UNESCO World Heritage Site.

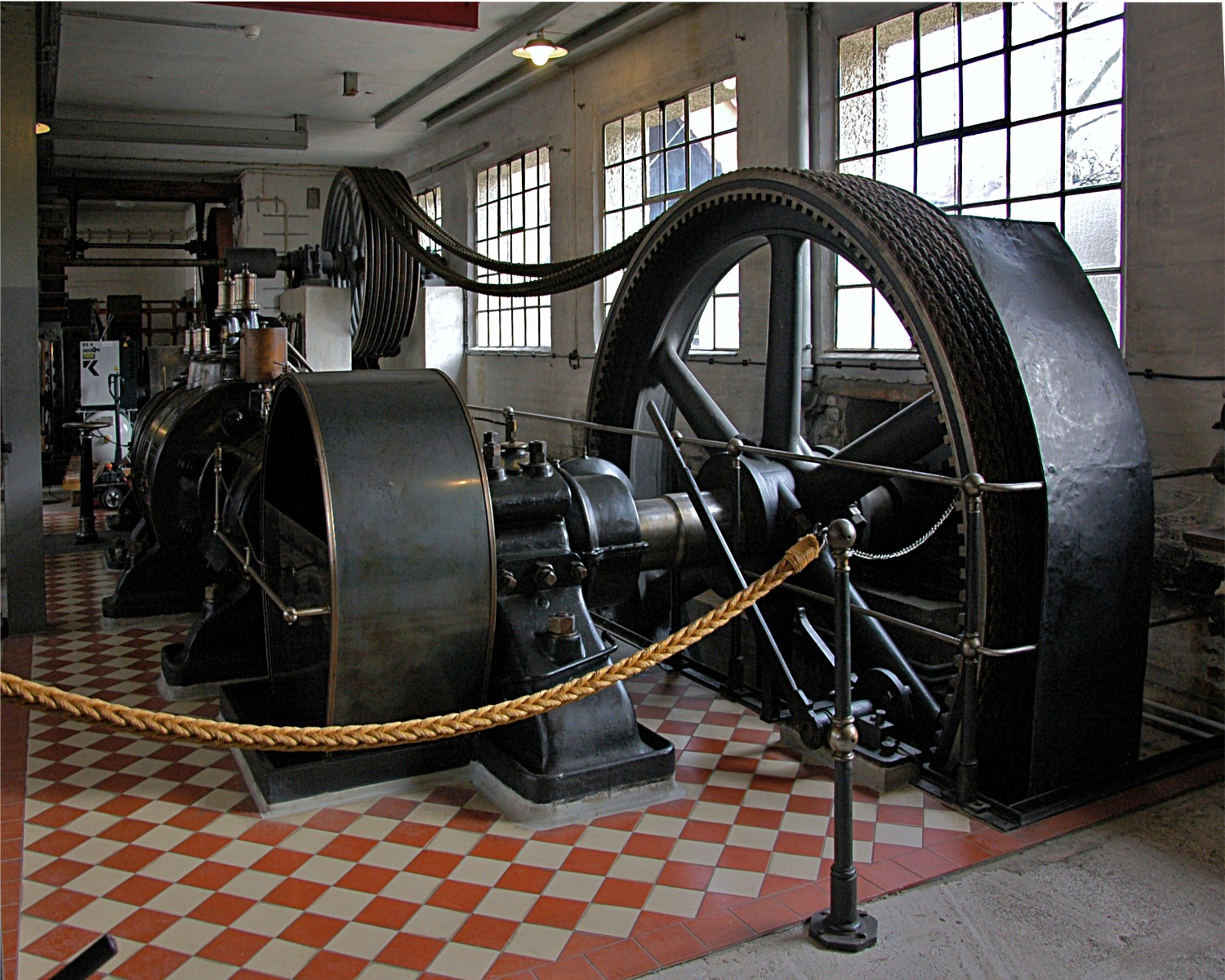
A preserved steam engine in Germany - one of the symbols of the Industrial Revolution, and a common topic of study for industrial archaeologists.

Industrial archaeology (IA) is the systematic study of material and immaterial evidence associated with past and present industrial processes. This can be either the material culture of a manufacturing process from any period or, more often, the study of the process of industrialisation through material evidence. This evidence includes buildings, machinery, artifacts, sites, infrastructure, documents, and other items associated with the production, manufacture, extraction, transport, or construction of a product or range of products. It also includes the landscape impact of industrialsiation, both rural and urban. It is related to but, separate from, the study of industrial heritage. The field of industrial archaeology incorporates a range of disciplines including archaeology, architecture, construction, engineering, historic preservation, museology, technology, urban planning and other specialties, in order to piece together the history of past industrial activities and their impact on society. The scientific interpretation of material evidence is often necessary, as the written record of many industrial techniques is often incomplete or nonexistent. Industrial archaeology includes both the examination of standing structures and sites that must be studied by an excavation.

The field of industrial archaeology developed during the 1950s in Great Britain, at a time when many historic industrial sites and artifacts were being lost throughout that country, including the notable case of Euston Arch in London. In the 1960s and 1970s, with the rise of national cultural heritage movements, industrial archaeology grew as a distinct form of archaeology, with a strong emphasis on preservation, first in Great Britain, and later in the United States and other parts of the world. During this period, the first organized national industrial heritage inventories were begun, including the Industrial Monuments Survey in England and the Historic American Engineering Record in the United States. Additionally, a number of regional and national IA organizations were established, including the North American-based Society for Industrial Archeology in 1971, and the British-based Association for Industrial Archaeology in 1973. That same year, the First International Conference on the Conservation of Industrial Monuments was held at Ironbridge in Shropshire. This conference led, in 1978, to the formal establishment of The International Committee for the Conservation of the Industrial Heritage (commonly known as "TICCIH") as a worldwide organization for the promotion of industrial heritage. The members of these and other IA groups are generally a diverse mix of professionals and volunteers who share a common interest in promoting the study, appreciation and preservation of industrial archaeology and industrial heritage resources.

== Industrial archaeology topics and sites ==
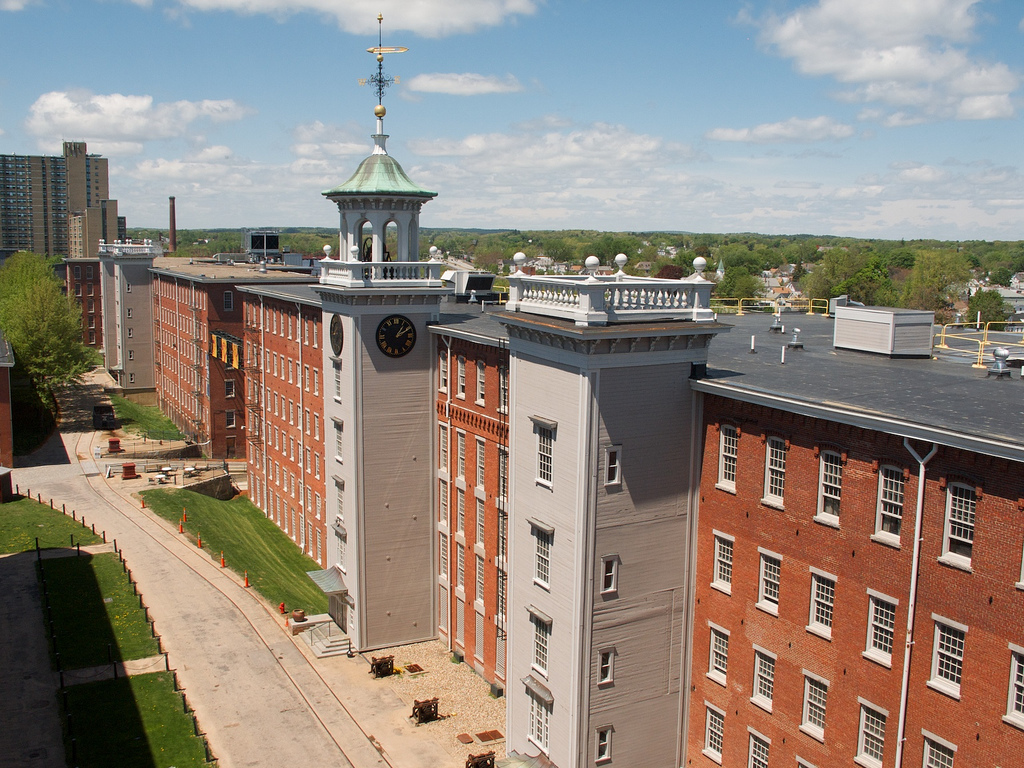
Boott Cotton Mills, Lowell, Massachusetts, restored as part of the Lowell National Historic Park, established the 1970s largely through the efforts of industrial archaeologists.

Industrial archaeology, that is the archaeology of industrialisation, covers a wide range of topics, from early ironworks and water-powered mills, to large 20th century factories, as well as ancillary sites and structures such as worker housing, warehouses, and infrastructure.
Generally, the four largest IA categories are:

- Extractive (also known as "basic materials", which includes mining, quarrying, petroleum, lumbering, etc.),
- Manufacturing (mills and factories, including their power systems and machinery),
- Public utilities (water, sewer, electric, gas, etc.), and
- Transport (canals, railways, roads, aviation, bridges, tunnels, etc.).

Additionally, the topic of power generation (water, wind, steam, electric, etc.), while applicable to each of the four major IA categories, is sometimes considered its own category.

The work of industrial archaeologists has led to greater public awareness of industrial landscapes and industrial heritage, including the creation of industry museums and the inclusion of sites on national and international historic cultural registers in many parts of the world. Notable examples include the Ironbridge Gorge Museums, Engelsberg Ironworks and Lowell National Historical Park, among many others.

== History of industrial archaeology ==
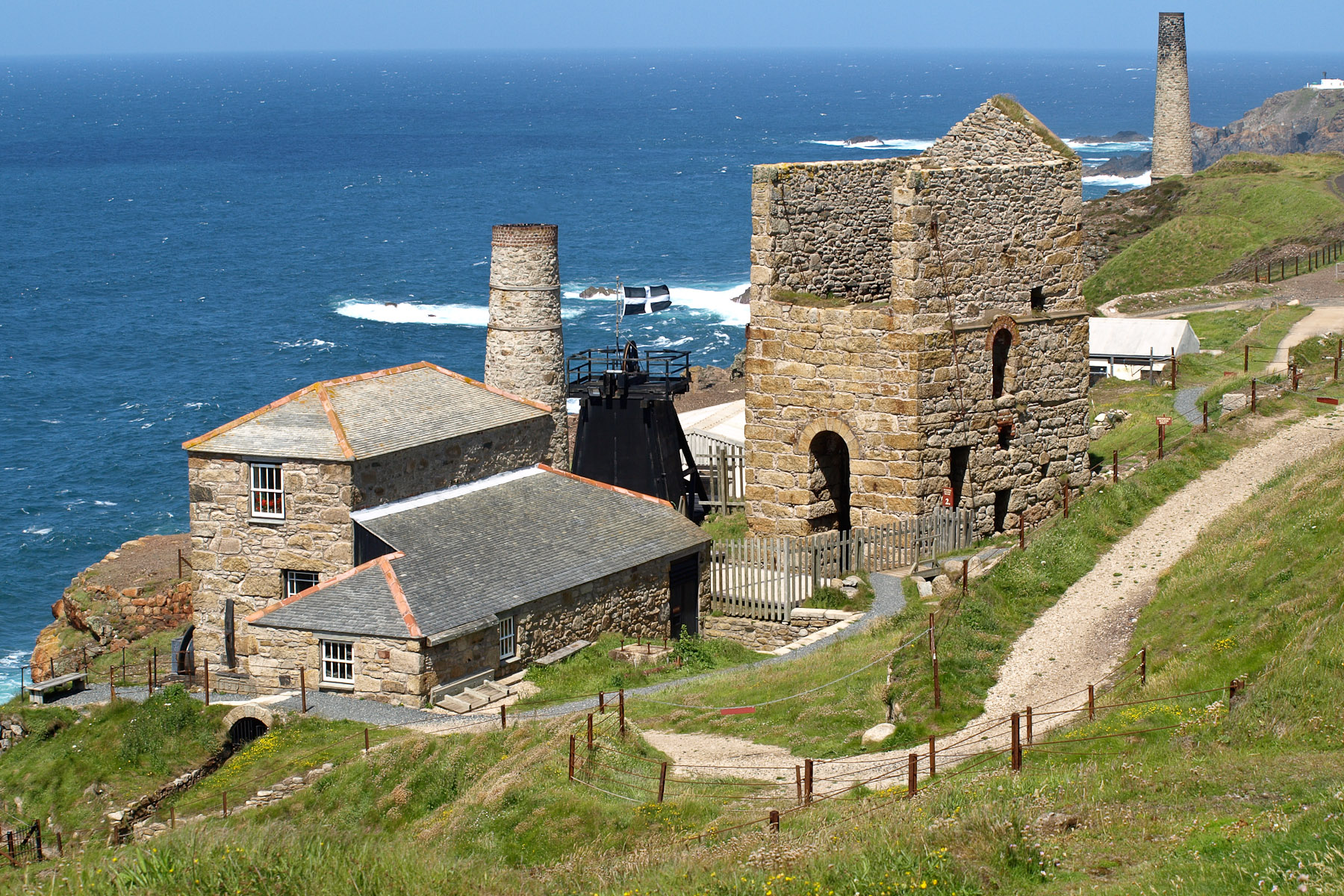
Levant Mine in Cornwall, an early subject of preservation in the 1930s.

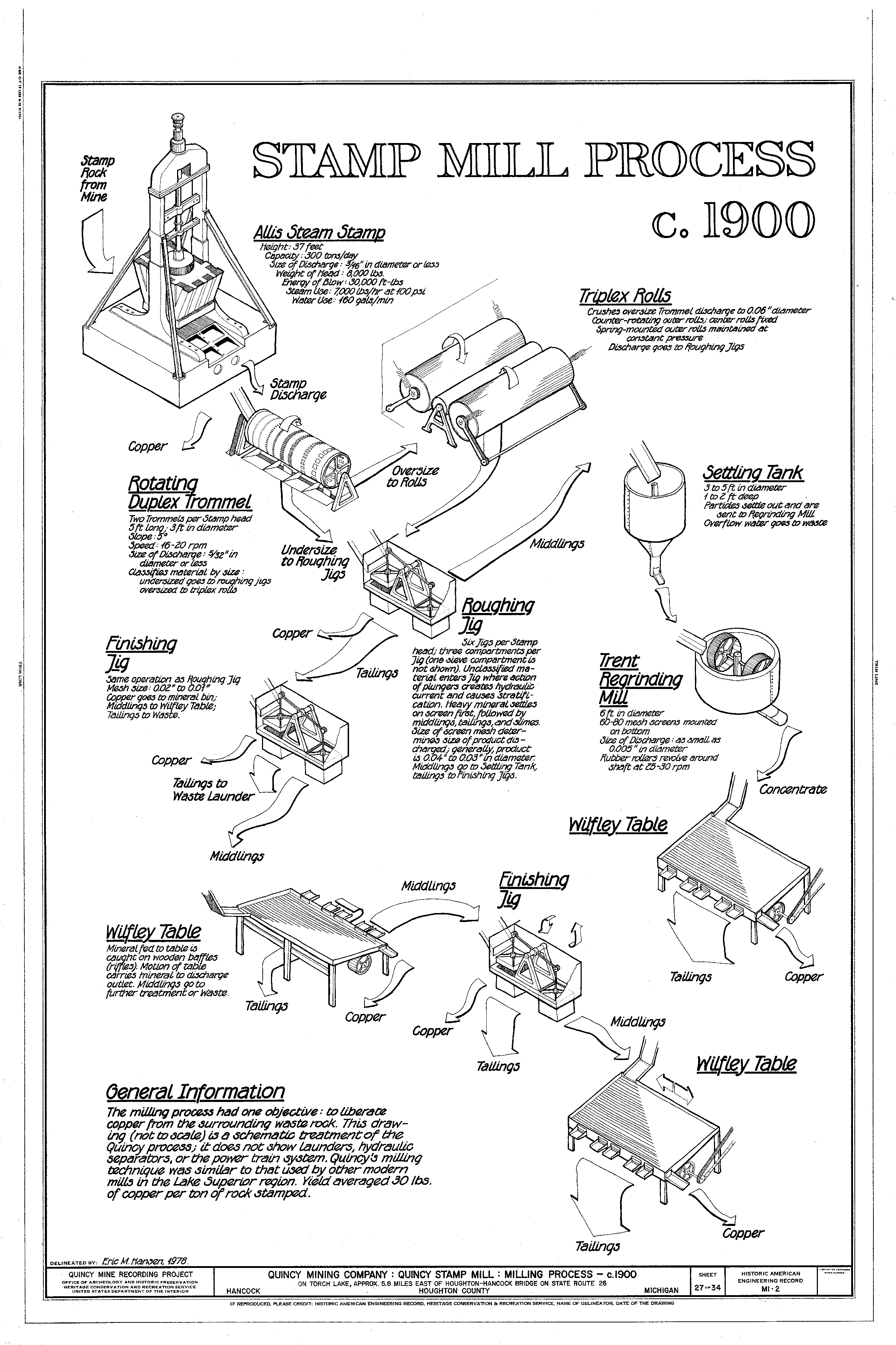
A detailed technical drawing of the stamp mill process at the Quincy Stamp Mill, Houghton, Michigan, produced as part of the Quincy Mine Recording Project by the Historic American Engineering Record in 1978

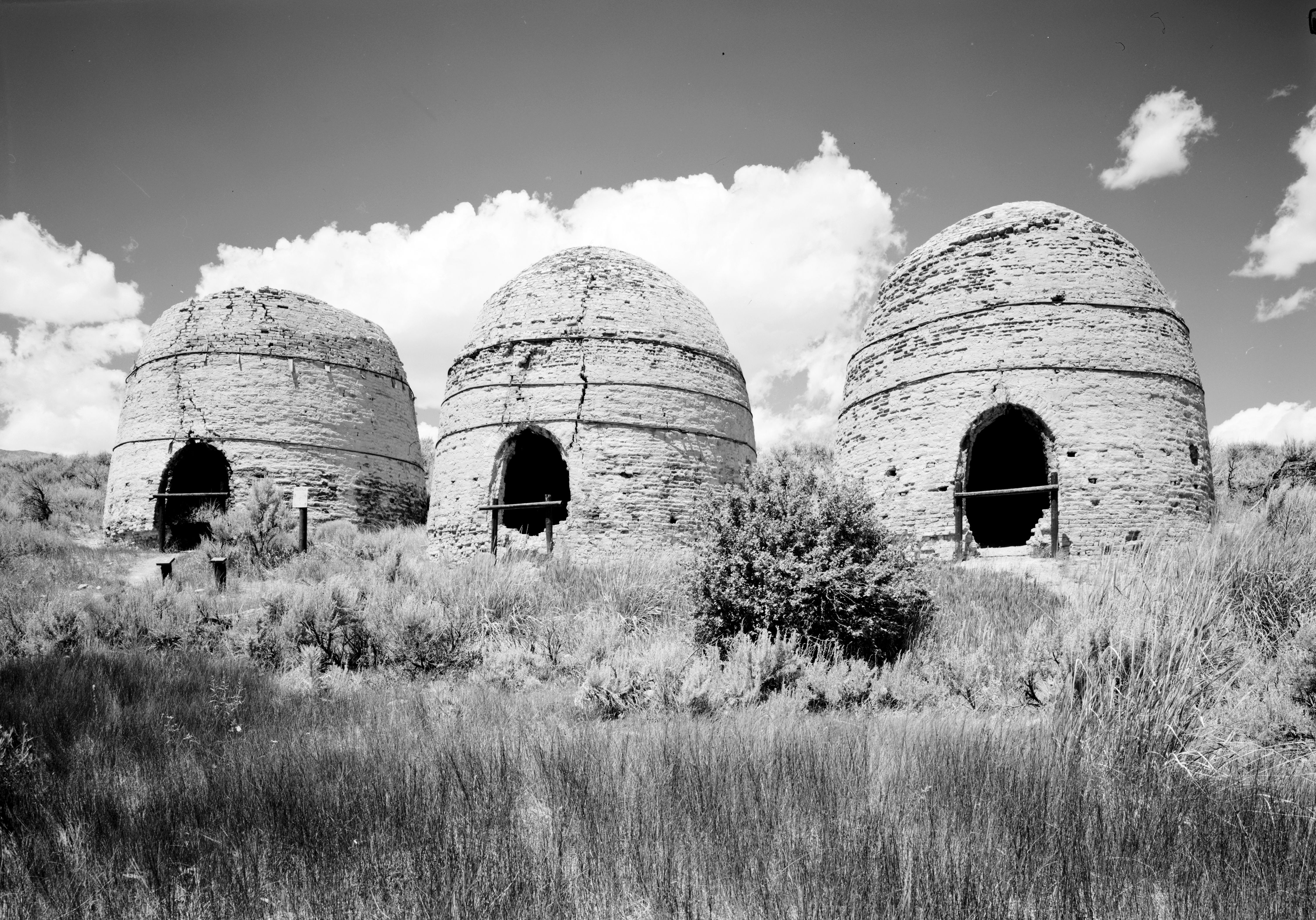
Birch Creek Charcoal Kilns near Leadore, Idaho. Added to the National Register of Historic Places in 1972.

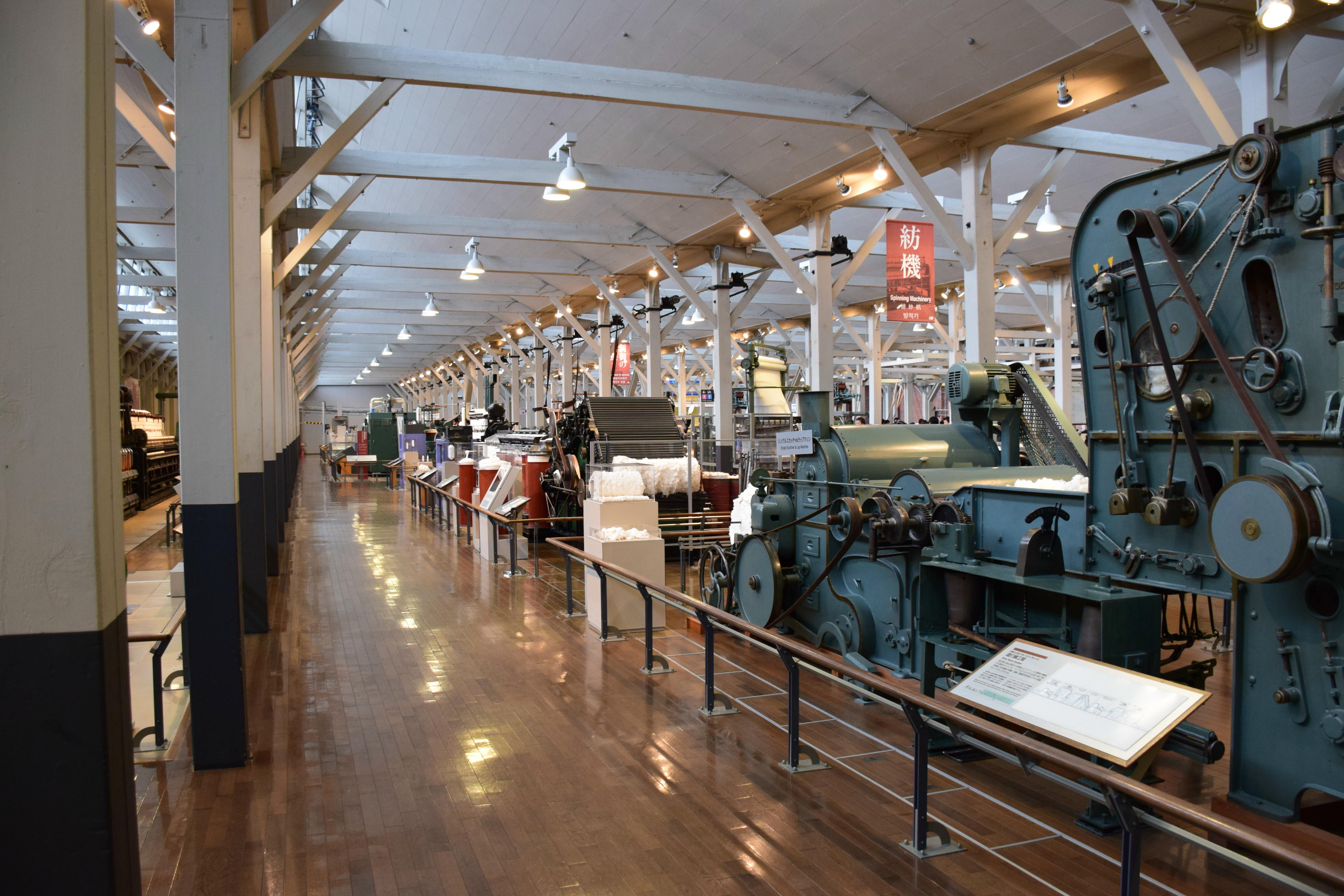
Textile machinery on display at the Toyota Commemorative Museum of Industry and Technology in Nagoya, Japan

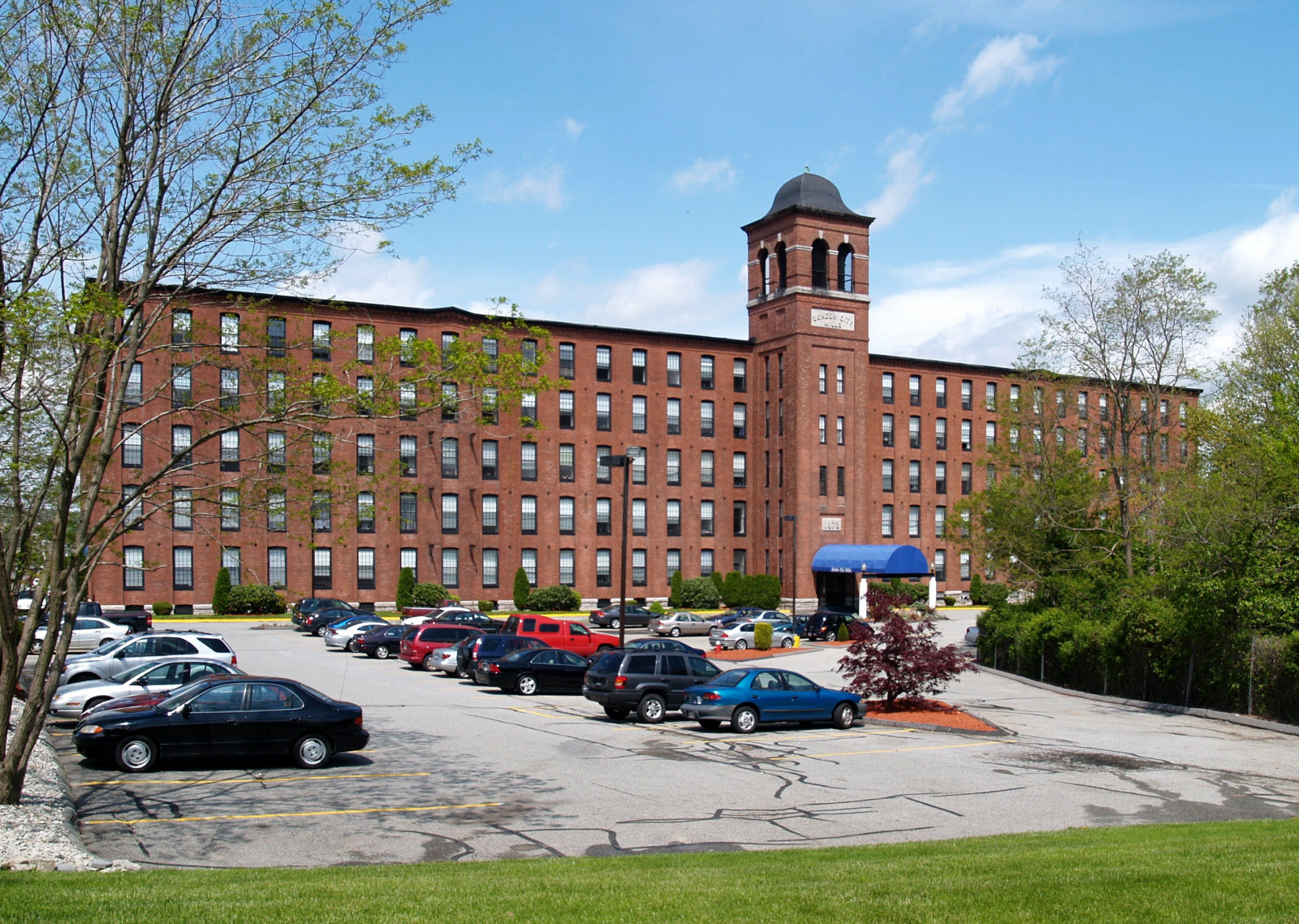
Border City Mill Apartments, Fall River, Massachusetts, an example of the adaptive reuse of an industrial heritage site.

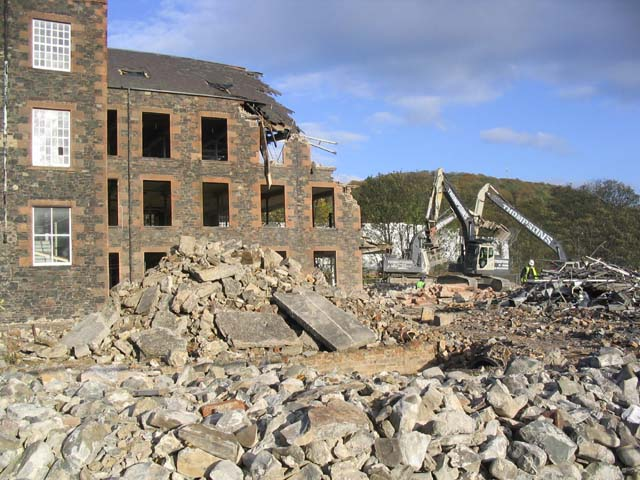
Despite extensive preservation efforts in recent decades, many historic industrial sites continue to be lost to fire, neglect and demolition.

=== Early developments ===
One of the earliest forerunners of the mid-20th-century IA-movement was the Sheffield Trades Technical Societies, established in 1918 at the University of Sheffield to preserve elements of that city's industrial history. In 1920, the Newcomen Society was founded in Great Britain to foster the study of the history of engineering and technology, including many relics of the Industrial Revolution, such as steam engines, canals, iron bridges, machinery, and other historical artifacts. The Newcomen Society also established the Journal of Industrial Archaeology in 1964, first national IA-publication in the UK. Another early development was the formation of the Cornish Engines Preservation Committee (CEPC) in 1935, to rescue the Levant Mine and Beam Engine in Cornwall.

During the early 20th century, the historic preservation movement in the United States was still in its infancy. Most of the historic sites that received any attention were related to presidents and political figures, or the early colonial period. However, in 1925, one of the first industrial museums in the United States opened at Old Slater Mill, in Pawtucket, Rhode Island, at the site of the first successful textile mill in the country, built in 1793. The museum was founded by a group of business leaders with ties to the New England textile industry, during a period of decline due to Southern competition. The Old Slater Mill Association had the foresight to restore the old mill to its early 19th-century appearance, and fill it with a representative collection of textile machinery. In 1966, Old Slater Mill was declared a National Historic Landmark. In the early 1970s, Paul E. Rivard, then the director of the Old Slater Mill museum was one of the key figures in the founding of the Society for Industrial Archeology.

Another notable example of an early industrial archaeology site (one that predates the widespread IA-movement), is the Saugus Iron Works National Historic Site in Saugus, Massachusetts. It is the site of the first integrated iron works in North America, and was reconstructed in the 1950s after extensive archaeological excavations that began in the late 1940s by Roland W. Robbins.

=== Beginnings of the IA movement ===
The term "industrial archaeology" was popularised in Great Britain in 1955 by Michael Rix of Birmingham University, who wrote an article in The Amateur Historian, about the need for greater study and preservation of 18th and 19th century industrial sites and relics of the British Industrial Revolution. In 1959, Council for British Archaeology (CBA) established an industrial archaeology research committee. The CBA soon developed a standardized record card for industrial monuments, which it distributed to volunteer groups around the UK. In 1965, the National Record of Industrial Monuments (NRIM) was created as a central archive for the record cards that had been collected by Angus Buchanan at the University of Bath. By the late 1960s, a number of local industrial archaeology groups had been formed in the UK, including the Gloucestershire Society for Industrial Archaeology in 1963, the Bristol Industrial Archaeological Society in 1967, and the Greater London Industrial Archaeology Society in 1968, among others. The primary mission of these local IA groups during this period was recording the remaining relics of industrial history, especially those deemed to be most at risk from urban redevelopment schemes. Depending on the condition of the site or artifact, recording typically consists of compiling a brief summary of the site's history through available records, including old maps or photographs, followed by detailed onsite measurements, drawings and photographs of the existing conditions of the site. Generally, a report is prepared and copies are filed in a public archive for the benefit of future generations. Most recording trips are intended to obtain a general overview of existing conditions, and are not meant to be an exhaustive study.

One of the first areas to be the subject of a systematic study of industrial archaeology was the Ironbridge Gorge in Shropshire, United Kingdom. This landscape developed from the 17th century as one of the first industrial landscapes in the world, and by the 18th century had a range of extractive industries as well as extensive iron making, ceramic manufacturing, and a series of early railways. The Ironbridge Gorge Museum Trust was established in 1967, and the significance of the Ironbridge Gorge was recognized in 1986 with its designation as a UNESCO World Heritage Site.

In 1963, British journalist Kenneth Hudson published the first IA text, titled Industrial archaeology: an introduction. Four years later in April 1967, Hudson spoke at a seminar at the Smithsonian Institution in Washington, D.C., at what is considered the birth of the IA-movement in the United States. The seminar, which was attended by an audience of historic preservationists, museum professionals and others, focused on what was being done to promote the study of industrial archaeology in Great Britain and in Europe, and what needed to be done in the United States. By this time, a number of select historic industrial sites had been recorded by the Historic American Buildings Survey (HABS), which until then had mainly concentrated its efforts on architecturally significant sites. In 1967, the notable New England Textile Mills Survey (NETMS) was performed under the HABS umbrella, led by Robert M. Vogel, curator of the Division of Mechanical and Civil at the Smithsonian Museum of History and Technology. The NETMS was the first large-scale, industrial recording project by HABS. It was followed by the New England Textile Mill Survey II in 1968. The full reports from the 1967 and 1968 textile mill surveys are now available for public viewing on the Library of Congress website, including the Amoskeag Millyard in Manchester, New Hampshire, which was drastically altered soon after the survey was completed.

The success of the 1967 and 1968 mill surveys led to the formation of the Historic American Engineering Record (HAER) in 1969, in conjunction with the American Society of Civil Engineers. Since then, thousands of industrial / engineering sites and structures throughout the United States have been recorded by HAER, and are on record at the Library of Congress for public benefit.

=== 1970s-1980s ===
By the early 1970s, industrial archaeology was, for the most part, being practiced in a few select countries by amateurs and professionals with different backgrounds and objectives. While much had been accomplished during the preceding decade, the "new" field of industrial archaeology was still struggling to gain acceptance as a true scholarly pursuit. In October 1971, a group of representatives from various museums, universities, and government organizations in the United States and Canada met in Washington, D.C. to establish a means to improve the exchange of ideas and information. The result was the first national-level, IA-related academic society in the world; the Society for Industrial Archeology (SIA). It was decided that the name of the Society would take on the US-Government's spelling of "archeology", instead of "archaeology". The first SIA newsletter was published in January 1972, with Robert M. Vogel as editor. In April of that same year the new group held its first annual conference in New York City. In 1975, the SIA introduced its academic journal, IA, The Journal of the Society for Industrial Archeology, with Emory Kemp as editor.

In 1973, the Association for Industrial Archaeology (AIA) was founded in Great Britain. It brought together the numerous local IA-groups that had been formed throughout the country. The AIA publishes a newsletter, Industrial Archaeology News, along with its academic journal, Industrial Archaeology Review, introduced in 1976. Many AIA members have been active in promoting the mission of IA throughout Europe and the rest of the world.

With the rapid decline of many established industries in North America and Europe during the 1970s, industrial archaeologists began to take on a new role of recording and preserving recently closed sites, as opposed to antique relics from earlier periods. Among the notable projects during this decade was the successful transformation of Sloss Furnaces in Birmingham, Alabama after it shut down in 1971 into an open air industrial museum. Sloss Furnaces was declared an NHL in 1981. The museum opened in 1983 and offers a variety of educational and civic programs.

In 1977, on the initiative of Bruno Corti and following the first studies in Italy, the Italian Society of Industrial Archaeology, SIAI, was founded. The first president was art historian Eugenio Battisti. The SIAI immediately publishes an important journal for defining the cultural boundaries of the continental paths of industrial archaeology, “Il Coltello di Delfo". The following year the British Council of Rome promotes the exhibition "I resti di una rivoluzione", set up in Milan, Florence, Perugia and Naples.

In 1982, I.A.Recordings was founded by a small group of volunteers in the UK, to record past and present industries on film and video, as a resource for future generations.

During the 1980s, the scope of the field of industrial archaeology in Great Britain shifted away from what was taken place in North America, where the theories of social archaeology that were developed in the historical archaeology field began to be applied to the study of industrial sites. British industrial archaeologists meanwhile mainly focused on the recording of the technical aspects of sites and artifacts. One key development during this period was the shift toward thematic studies of monuments by type, including three initial textile mill surveys in Greater Manchester, Yorkshire and eastern Cheshire led by Keith Falconer.

=== Since 1990 ===
Since 1990, there has been an ever-increasing awareness of the importance of industrial heritage, confirmed most prominently by the addition of numerous industrial sites to the UNESCO World Heritage List. Many preserved industrial sites have become a vital part of heritage tourism, including the European Route of Industrial Heritage (ERIH), established in 1999. Based on the success of the Route der Industriekultur in Ruhr, Germany, the ERIH has expanded to consist of sixteen routes in seven countries, with plans for new routes in additional countries. The number of industrial sites that have been preserved and converted to other uses such as apartments, public spaces or museums instead of being demolished is also a testament to the efforts of industrial archaeologists.

Industrial archaeology has gradually gained acceptance in the academic arena. In the UK, where the field developed largely from the efforts of volunteer researchers, the emergence of developer-funded projects in the past two decades has led to an increased presence of professional practitioners, with the application of theoretical archaeology methods such as landscape archaeology to the industrial setting. However, while many university archaeology departments now include the industrial period in their degree courses, industrial archaeology remains a fairly limited field of study, with few dedicated industrial archaeology programs, such as those offered at Michigan Technological University and the Ironbridge Institute.

Widespread appreciation of the importance of industrial heritage by the general public is still lacking in many areas, as the subject often maintains the perception of being "not old enough" to truly be considered archaeology. Additionally, there are often negative associations with neglected or abandoned industrial sites, including the social, economic and environmental consequences ("brownfield" sites). As with other history-based fields, one of the continuing challenges of industrial archaeologists throughout the world is the competition for ever-decreasing public funding for their research, educational and preservation projects. The sheer number of historic industrial sites and limited funding often means that many are still being lost to neglect, fire and demolition.

In 2003, the Nizhny Tagil Charter was adopted by TICCIH at its XII Congress in Nizhny Tagil, Russia. It is the international standard for the study, documentation, conservation and interpretation of the industrial heritage.

== IA organizations ==
There are national industrial archaeology societies in many countries. They bring together people interested in researching, recording, preserving and presenting industrial heritage. Industrial architecture, mineral extraction, heritage-based tourism, power technology, adaptive reuse, and transport history are just some of the themes that are investigated by society members. Most groups publish periodic newsletters and host a variety of conferences, seminars and tours of IA-sites and still-active industries (known as process tours). IA organizations may also be involved in advising on historic conservation matters, or advising government units on revision or demolition of significant sites or buildings.

Alias	Organization Name	Country / Region	Established	Website
AIA	Association for Industrial Archaeology	Great Britain	1973	industrial-archaeology.org
AIPAI	Associazione Italiana per il Patrimonio Archeologico Industriale	Italy	1997	https://www.aipaipatrimonioindustriale.com/
APPI	Associação Portuguesa para o Património Industrial	Portugal	1997	www.museudaindustriatextil.org/appi
CILAC	Comité d'information et de liaison pour l'archéologie, l'étude et la mise en valeur du patrimoine industriel	France	1979	www.cilac.com
E-FAITH	European Federation of Associations of Industrial and Technical Heritage	Europe		www.e-faith.org
FIEN	Federatie Industrieel Erfgoed Nederland	Netherlands	1984	www.industrieel-erfgoed.nl
IHAI	Industrial Heritage Association of Ireland	Ireland	1996	www.ihai.ie
IHTIA	Institute for the History of Technology and Industrial Archaeology	West Virginia University, Morgantown, West Virginia, United States	1989	http://www.as.wvu.edu/ihtia
JIAS	Japan Industrial Archaeology Society	Japan	1977	jias.o.oo7.jp/index.html
LIMF	Latvijas Industriālā mantojuma fonds	Latvia	1992	English version
AIR	Romanian Association for Industrial Archaeology	Romania	2007	
PIWB	Patrimoine Industriel Wallonie-Bruxelles	Belgium	1984	https://www.patrimoineindustriel.be/en/piwb
SIA	Society for Industrial Archeology	United States / Canada	1971	www.sia-web.org
	Selskabet til Bevaring af Industrimiljøer	Denmark	1979	www.fabrikogbolig.dk/index.php
SGTI / ASHT	Swiss Society for the History of Technology and Industrial Heritage	Switzerland		www.sgti.ch or www.asht.ch
SIM	Svenska industriminnesföreningen	Sweden	1989	www.sim.se
TICCIH	The International Committee for the Conservation of the Industrial Heritage	international	1978	www.ticcih.org
	TICCIH España	Spain	1999	www.ticcih.es
	TICCIH Germany	Germany		German TICCIH National Committee
	TICCIH Mexico	Mexico	2006	www.ticcihmexico.org
TICCIH-Brasil	Comitê Brasileiro de Preservação do Patrimônio Industrial	Brazil	2003	www.patrimonioindustrial.org.br
	TICCIH Australia	Australia	2008	TICCIH in Oz discussion group
VVIA	Vlaamse Vereniging voor Industriële Archeologie	Flanders	1978	www.vvia.be

== See also ==
- Arthur Raistrick
- Aviation archaeology
- I.A.Recordings
- Industrial archaeology of Dartmoor
- Industrial heritage
- List of tunnels in the United Kingdom
- Ken Major
- Major Mining Sites of Wallonia
- Mill conversion
- Quarry Bank Mill
- Railway archaeology
- Rex Wailes
