= Marilyn Palmer =

British archaeologist

Marilyn Palmer, MBE, FSA (née Allum; born 30 April 1943) is a British historian, archaeologist and academic, who specialises in landscape history and industrial archaeology. Having been a school teacher, she moved into academia and taught at Loughborough College, Loughborough University, and Leicester University. She was the United Kingdom's first Professor of Industrial Archaeology.

== Academic career ==
Palmer was a school teacher before moving into academia, joining Loughborough College as a lecturer in 1969. She was promoted to senior lecturer in 1972, before moving to Loughborough University in 1977. She served as head of its History Department from 1983 to 1988. In 1988, she joined Leicester University as a senior lecturer in history. She was additionally a Member of the Royal Commission on the Historical Monuments of England from 1993 to 1999. From 1998 to 2000, she was head of its Archaeology Division and Reader in Industrial Archaeology. Having been appointed the United Kingdom's first Professor of Industrial Archaeology, she was Head of the School of Archaeology and Ancient History from 2000 to 2006. She retired from full-time academia in 2008, and was made emeritus professor.

On 2 February 1991, Palmer was elected a Fellow of the Society of Antiquaries of London (FSA). In the 2015 Birthday Honours, she was appointed Member of the Order of the British Empire (MBE) for services to industrial archaeology and heritage.

== Selected works ==
- Palmer, Marilyn (1992). Industrial landscapes of the East Midlands. Chichester, Sussex: Phillimore. ISBN 978-0850338294.
- Palmer, Marilyn; Neaverson, Peter (1994). Industry in the landscape: 1700-1900. London: Routledge. ISBN 978-0415112062.
- Palmer, Marilyn; Neaverson, Peter (1998). Industrial archaeology: principles and practice. London: Routledge. ISBN 978-0415167697.
- Palmer, Marilyn; Nevell, Michael; Sissons, Mark (2012). Industrial archaeology: a handbook. York: Council for British Archeology. ISBN 978-1902771922.
- Palmer Marilyn and West, Ian (2016). Technology in the Country House. Swindon: Historic England in association with the National Trust. ISBN 978-1848022805
