= The International Committee for the Conservation of the Industrial Heritage =

International industrial archaeology society

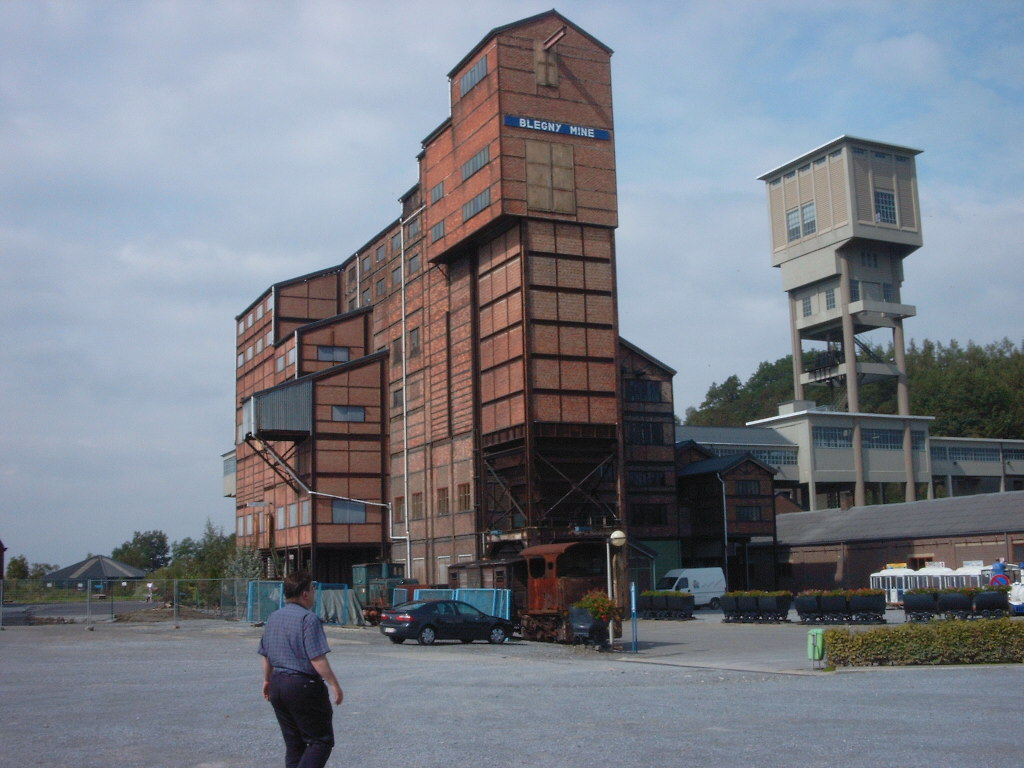
Blegny-Mine - a part of Major Mining Sites of Wallonia (a UNESCO World Heritage Site)

The International Committee for the Conservation of the Industrial Heritage, usually known by its acronym TICCIH, is the international society dedicated to the study of industrial archaeology and the protection, promotion and interpretation of the industrial heritage. TICCIH's Nizhny Tagil Charter, signed in 2003, is the international guidance document for the industrial heritage. In 2011, the Joint ICOMOS – TICCIH Principles for the Conservation of Industrial Heritage Sites, Structures, Areas and Landscapes, also called "The Dublin Principles", were adopted in Paris.

== Interests ==
Its period of interest extends forward from the start of the Industrial Revolution and generally includes the material and documentary remains of manufacturing and extractive industry, transport and public service infrastructure. Reflecting the interdisciplinary nature of industrial archaeology, it draws in enthusiasts and professionals from many fields.

== Foundation and function ==
TICCIH was founded after the First International Conference for the Conservation of the Industrial Heritage in Ironbridge, England, in 1973. It holds a triennial conference of which the last one was in Santiago de Chile, Chile, in 2018. It is organized through a Board and President who are chosen by the National Representatives of the various national committees or associated societies. It has both individual members and national societies such as the North American Society for Industrial Archeology (SIA), the French Comité d'information et de liaison pour l'archéologie, l'étude et la mise en valeur du patrimoine industriel (CILAC) or the British Association for Industrial Archaeology (AIA). Members receive the digital quarterly TICCIH Bulletin and discounted fees for the congress.

TICCIH has been ICOMOS’s specialist adviser on industrial heritage since 2000 and assesses industrial sites for the World Heritage List. It has published a series of guideline documents including canals, railways, bridges and coal mines, which can be downloaded from the TICCIH or ICOMOS websites.

== Publications ==
Industrial Heritage Re-Tooled, the TICCIH guide to industrial heritage was published in November, 2012.

== Turin Charter ==
In 2013 all 61 national member organizations of the Fédération Internationale des Véhicules Anciens (FIVA) ratified and enacted the "Turin Charter", set forth by TICCIH "to preserve and safeguard the history of vehicles including their engineering, form, functions and documented histories and their many and diverse relationships with society and social environments, .." The Turin Charter follows in the trail of the Venice Charter for the Conservation and Restoration of Monuments and Sites, the Barcelona Charter, in full the "European Charter for the Conservation and Restoration of Traditional Ships in Operation", and the Riga Charter on Authenticity and Historical Reconstruction in Relationship to Cultural Heritage, which articulated standards for the maintenance and preservation of historically significant buildings, watercraft and rail vehicles, respectively.

== See also ==
- Industrialisation
