= Association for Industrial Archaeology =

- Abbreviation: AIA
- Formation: 1973
- Registration no.: 270410 (Charity Commission)
- Legal status: Active
- Purpose: Promotion of industrial archaeology, conservation, and research
- Headquarters: Ironbridge, Shropshire
- Region served: Great Britain and Ireland
- President: Marilyn Palmer
- Chairman: David Perrett
- Publication: Industrial Archaeology Review; Industrial Archaeology News
- Affiliations: Council for British Archaeology (CBA); TICCIH; E-faith
- Website: industrial-archaeology.org

The Association for Industrial Archaeology (AIA) was established in Great Britain in 1973 to promote the study of industrial archaeology and to encourage improved standards of recording, research, conservation and publication. It aims to support individuals and groups involved in those objectives and to represent the interests of industrial archaeology at a national level. It is a registered charity and a company limited by guarantee.

== Governance ==
Overall administration is carried out by an elected Council of Management, whilst day-to-day operations are overseen by the officers of the association.

The association's president is Marilyn Palmer, Professor Emeritus of Industrial Archaeology, University of Leicester. David Perrett was elected as chairman in October 2020.

== Activities ==
Through its council, the association has contacts with both traditional archaeology and with those statutory organisations responsible for recording, preserving and funding Britain's historic monuments. The council also has contacts with the International Committee for the Conservation Of Industrial Heritage (TICCIH) and, at the European level, the European Federation of Associations of Industrial and Technical Heritage (E-faith).

Since its foundation the association has gathered at an annual conference held at various places throughout the UK and Ireland. Each conference occupies a weekend but is followed by several days of visits and lectures. Additionally, the association organizes a spring weekend conference open to both members and non-members.

An important function of the association is to represent the interests of industrial archaeology in the planning process. The AIA is not a statutory consultee itself, and the association's role in the process is carried out by its Endangered Sites Officer via the Council for British Archaeology (CBA).

The AIA has made Restoration Grants for a number of projects, such as:

- Mellor Archaeological Trust for the restoration of the Wellington wheel pit;
- The Waterways Trust for the restoration of Box Boat 337;
- The South Yorkshire Trades Historical Trust for their work on Hoylandswaine Nail Forge.

The AIA also provides an opportunity for taking part in escorted overseas visits that explore engineering history and industrial archaeology.

== Publications ==
Industrial Archaeology Review, a bi-annual peer-reviewed journal, is sent to all members whilst a quarterly newsletter, the Industrial Archaeology News, contains shorter articles, reviews and a calendar of events. Additional occasional publications include regional gazetteers for areas where annual conferences take place.
