= IA (journal) =

Academic journal

- Discipline: Industrial archeology
- Language: English
- Edited by: Steven Walton

Publication details
- History: 1975−present
- Publisher: Society for Industrial Archeology
- Frequency: Biannual

Standard abbreviations
- ISO 4: IA

Indexing
- ISSN: 0160-1040
- LCCN: 79640088
- JSTOR: 01601040
- OCLC no.: 03617256

Links
- Journal homepage

IA: The Journal of the Society for Industrial Archeology is a biannual peer-reviewed academic journal published by the Society for Industrial Archeology, currently edited by Steven Walton (Michigan Technological University). IA publishes scholarly research, essays, and reviews of books published in the field of industrial archeology.

== History ==
The first issue of IA was published in 1975, followed by one issue per year through volume 11 (1985). From volume 12 (1986) through volume 45 (2019), the journal maintained a biannual frequency of publication, with occasional double issues.

IA has published a number of issues with articles on a common theme, including Montréal's Lachine Canal (2003), the Springfield Armory (1988), the West Point Foundry (2009), and three on the Historic American Engineering Record (1997, 1999, and 2018).
