= CILAC =

The Comité d'Information et de Liaison pour l'Archéologie, l'Étude et la Mise en Valeur du Patrimoine Industriel (CILAC) is a French non-profit organisation. Its aims are to assist the work of associations, learned societies and museums interested in the conservation and protection of the world's industrial heritage and to act as a lobby group in respect of issues which are important to its members.

The CILAC edits the journal L'Archéologie industrielle and an electronic newsletter.
