= Society for Industrial Archeology =

- Abbreviation: SIA
- Formation: 1971
- Founded at: Washington, D.C.
- Type: Nonprofit
- Headquarters: Department of Social Sciences, Michigan Technological University
- Location: 1400 Townsend Drive, Houghton, Michigan, US
- Website: sia-web.org

File:Society for Industrial Archeology-logo.jpg The Society for Industrial Archeology (SIA) is a North American nonprofit organization dedicated to studying and preserving historic industrial sites, structures and equipment. It was founded in 1971 in Washington, D.C., and its members are primarily from the United States and Canada, although there is some crossover with similar industrial archaeology organizations in the United Kingdom. SIA's headquarters is currently located in the Department of Social Sciences at Michigan Technological University in Houghton, Michigan. In addition to the national organization, there are thirteen regional chapters throughout the United States.

== Activities ==
Since its founding in October 1971, SIA members have gathered at an annual conference, which also serves as the annual business meeting required by its bylaws. The annual conference is typically held each spring. The Fall Tour, a second annual gathering usually held in September or October, began in 1972. Both annual events feature visits to local industrial sites, both active and historical. The conference additionally includes a day of paper sessions. Industrial heritage study tours to other countries began in 1990 and occur on an irregular schedule.

SIA produces two official publications, the formal, peer-reviewed IA, The Journal of the Society for Industrial Archeology twice a year and the less formal quarterly Society for Industrial Archeology Newsletter (SIAN). The annual conference is typically accompanied by a custom guidebook profiling local industrial and cultural sites. In addition, SIA produces occasional publications on special topics.

== Newsletter ==
The Society for Industrial Archeology Newsletter (SIAN) (ISSN 0160-1067) is the Society's official newsletter, published quarterly. SIAN publishes articles about recent events, summaries of the Society's annual conferences and fall tours, news about local chapters, brief abstracts of articles on industrial archeology-related subjects, and other notes and queries.

The first issue of SIAN was published in January 1972 and reported on the Society's founding. Volumes 1 through 9 consisted of six issues per calendar year, not including two special supplemental issues published in 1972. The current quarterly publication schedule with Winter, Spring, Summer, and Fall issues began with Volume 10 in 1981.

== See also ==
- Industrial archaeology
- Historic American Engineering Record
- The International Committee for the Conservation of the Industrial Heritage
