= Birch Creek Charcoal Kilns =

- Charcoal Kilns
- U.S. National Register of Historic Places
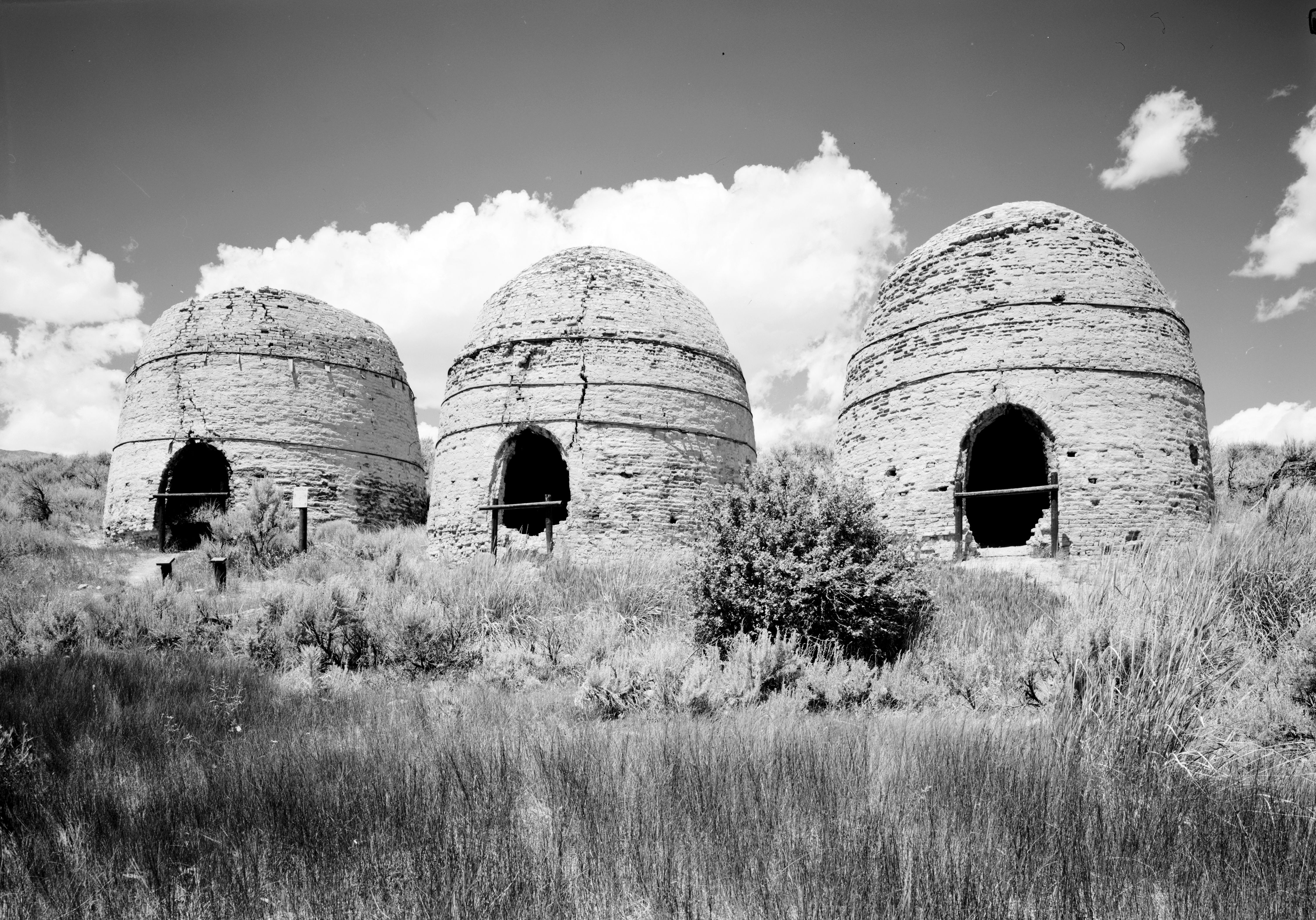

- Location within Idaho Location within the United States
- Nearest city: Leadore, Idaho
- Coordinates: 44°18′40″N 113°10′44″W
- Area: 6 acres (2.4 ha)
- Architect: Warren King
- NRHP reference No.: 72001577
- Added to NRHP: February 23, 1972

The Birch Creek Charcoal Kilns are a group of beehive-shaped clay charcoal kilns near Leadore, Idaho, built in 1886. They were listed on the National Register of Historic Places in 1972.

The kilns were built in 1886 to produce charcoal to fuel the smelter at Nicholia, which smelted lead and silver ore from the Viola Mine about 10 miles east of the kilns. The Viola ore deposit was discovered in 1881 and was mined until 1888 when the ore was depleted and the price of lead had fallen. The Nicholia smelter, located about 3 miles west of the mines, had two blast furnaces, each with a daily capacity of 40 short tons (36 t) of ore.

A Butte, Montana, man named Warren King built 16 kilns from brick made from local clay, possibly obtained from Jump Creek on the east side of the Birch Creek valley. The beehive-shaped kilns are each about 20 feet (6.1 m) tall and 20 feet (6.1 m) in diameter. When operating, each kiln used 30 to 40 cords of Douglas fir wood per load, producing about 1,500 to 2,000 bushels (70 cubic meters) of charcoal over a two-day burn. The kiln operation lasted for less than three years, employing 150 to 200 people at its peak, and had a monthly output estimated at 44,000 to 50,000 bushels (1550 to 1762 cubic meters) of charcoal.

The ruins of four kilns survive. They are located in the Caribou-Targhee National Forest, which operates the location as a public interpretive site. Nicholia is now a ghost town, with only a few ruins remaining. There are no surviving remains of the town of Woodland, a short distance south of the kilns, where the kiln workers lived. The kilns were listed on the National Register of Historic Places in 1972. The listing included four contributing structures on 6 acres (2.4 ha). In 1987, a volunteer-assisted stabilization effort prevented one of the kilns from collapsing. The Forest Service undertook a restoration of the kilns in 2000.
