= Sainte Marie Coal Mine =

Coal mine in France

Sainte-Marie coal mine
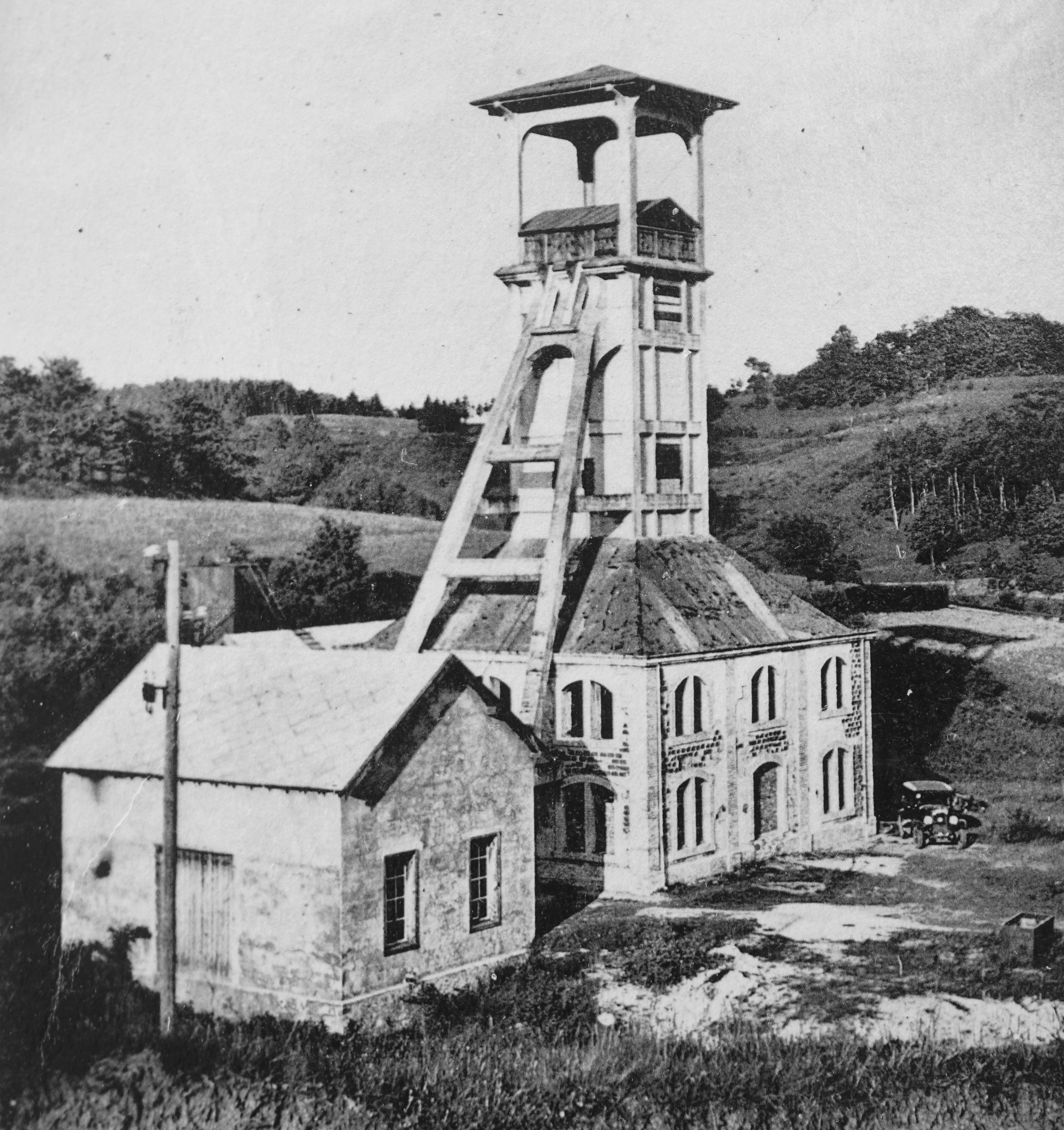
- Sainte-Marie coal mine in 1920

- Location within France
- Location: Haute-Saône, Franche-Comté, France; 47°42′10″N 6°37′47″E
- Products: coal
- Greatest depth: 359 metres
- Opened: 1864
- Closed: 1958
- Company: Houillères de Ronchamp, Électricité de France

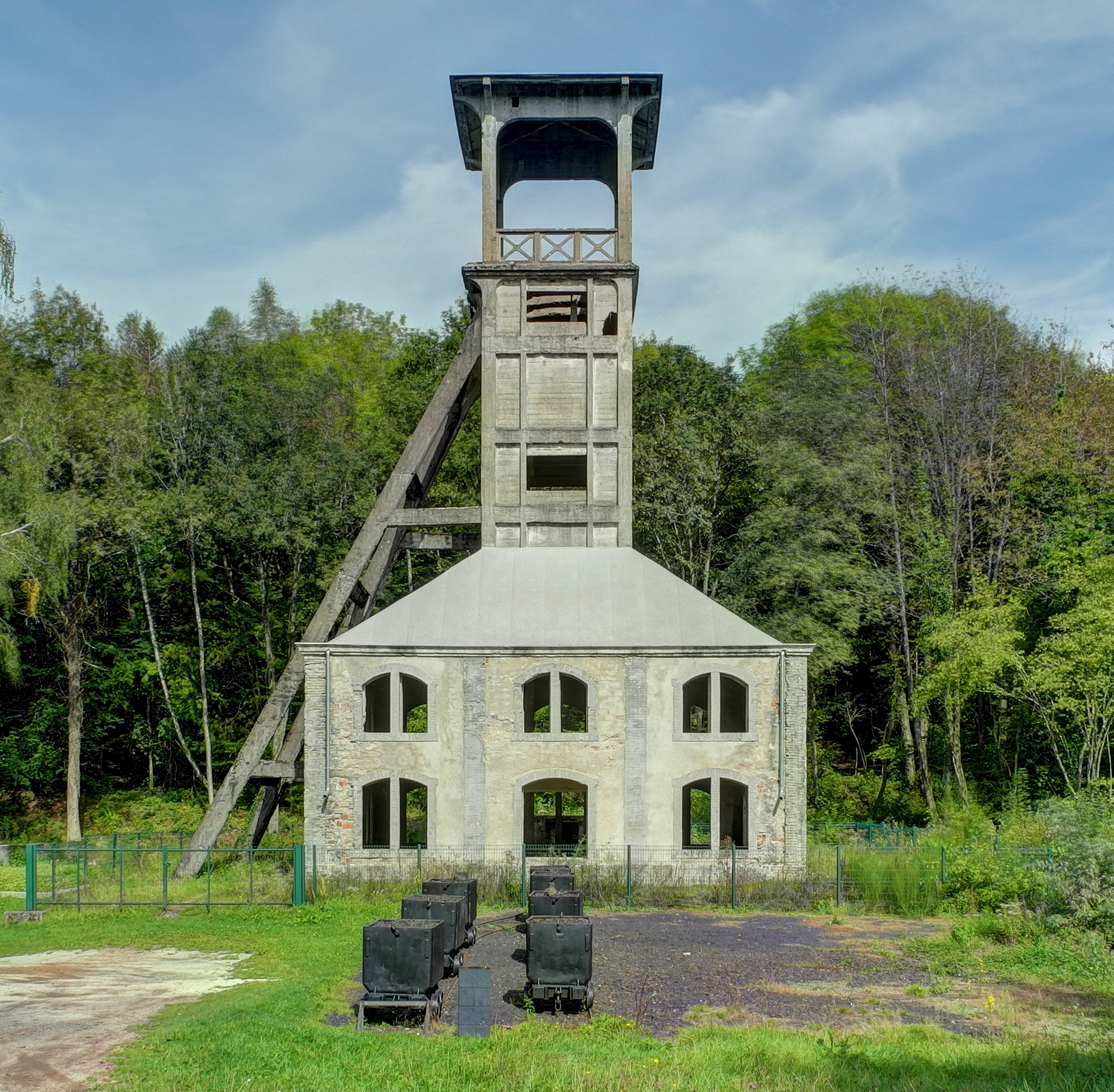
Sainte Marie coal mine in 2012

The Sainte Marie Coal Mine is one of the major Ronchamp coal mines, located in Bourlémont (Ronchamp, Haute-Saône), in eastern France. It was worked intermittently between 1866 and 1958, then finally closed. The concrete headframe was reinforced in 1924 by Charles Tournay. This Liège engineer and architect specialized in constructing concrete headframes. On 29 March 2001, the headframe was listed as a French national monument historique.

== Background ==
In 1830, a survey was conducted atop Bourlémont Hill, near the eventual site of the Sainte Marie Coal Mine, but no trace of coal was discovered. By the 1860s, the Stéphanien coal basin had been found, and the Saint-Charles, Saint-Joseph, Sainte-Pauline, and Sainte-Barbe mines were opened. Also ongoing at that time was the unsuccessful digging of the Saint-Georges pit.

== Mining ==
In 1863, it was decided that the Saint-Charles mine should be replaced by a new mineshaft to be dug to its west. The limits of the Ronchamp basin were not yet known, and the new mine was located 1.4 kilometres (0.87 mi) to the west, at the foot of Bourlémont. Digging of the 3.5-meter-diameter (11-foot) mineshaft was begun on 23 April 1864 and proceeded with the help of six horses and a steam winch. Workers completed the digging in two years, having found the coalfield at a depth of 239 metres (784 ft). The walls of the pit were constructed of Portland cement.

At a depth of 305 m (1,001 ft), workers discovered another, 60-centimetre layer of coal. When the digging eventually ceased, it had reached a depth of 359 m (1,178 ft).

The mine was dug in rough soil, but there was little water infiltration, unlike at most of the mines in the Ronchamp basin. The excavation cost a total of ₣172,157.93. Despite its small output, the site was developed with security systems and cages to carry the coal.

== Incidents ==
The first steam-powered hoist caused problems because as it saw use beyond the initial digging, which was its only intended purpose. The hoist broke on 13 November 1866, trapping five miners underground; they were rescued using a winch the following day. Two years later, the hoist was replaced with a machine taken from the Notre-Dame mine, which had a steam break, gears, and a spool shaft.

In January 1868 an extraction cage detached and damaged the guide ropes, which led to a two-week layoff for the miners. On 24 January 1868, the mine suffered a firedamp explosion that left eight dead and damaged 250 metres (820 ft) of its structural timbers.

After its closure the mine was filled with shale and topped with a concrete slab by Cotta. It had been planned that the headframe should be demolished, but because of strong community attachment to it as part of their heritage, it was saved in 1972 by Dr. Marcel Maulini, who went on to establish a museum of mining in Ronchamp.

== Pictures ==
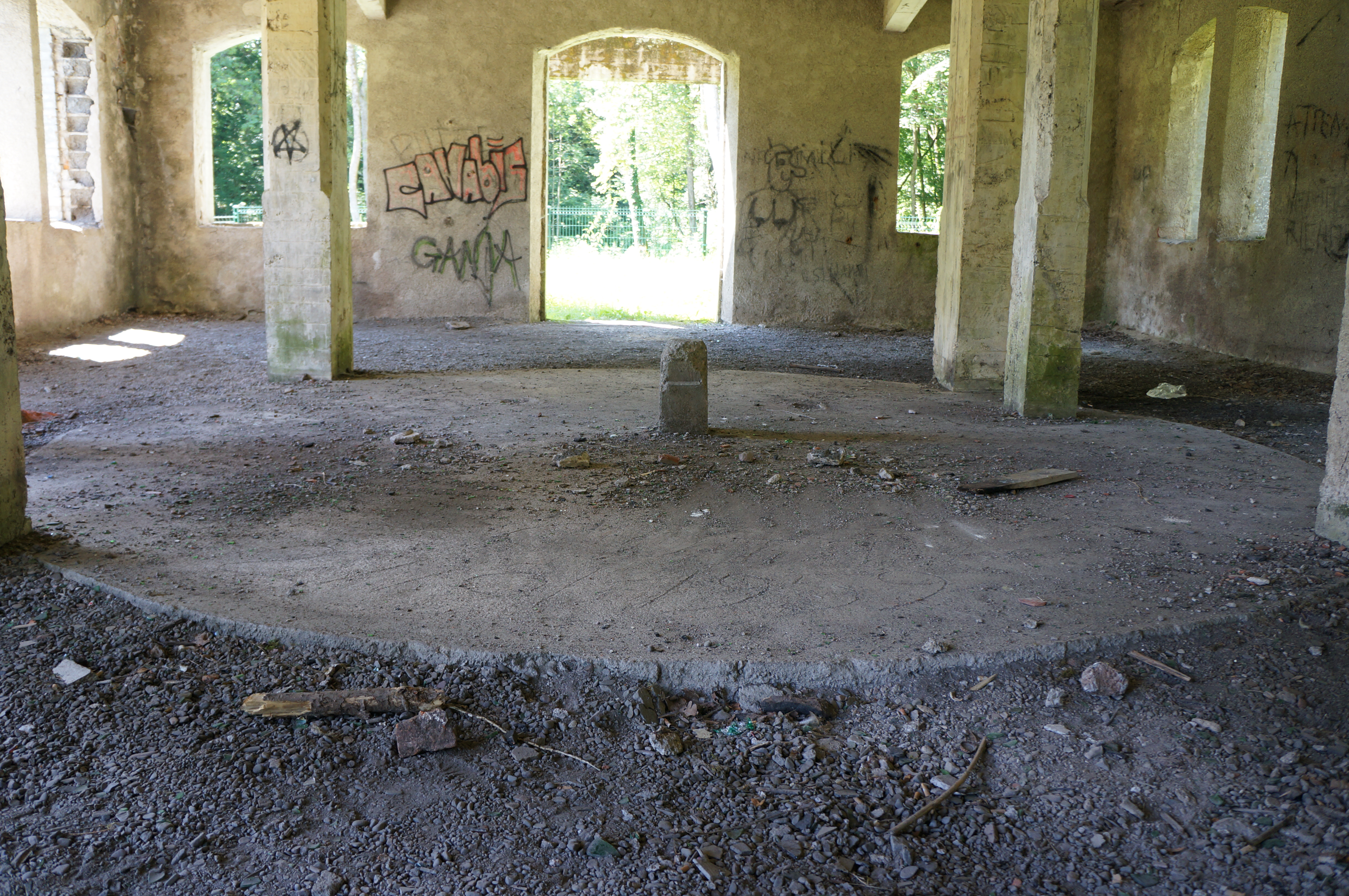
Mineshaft slab.

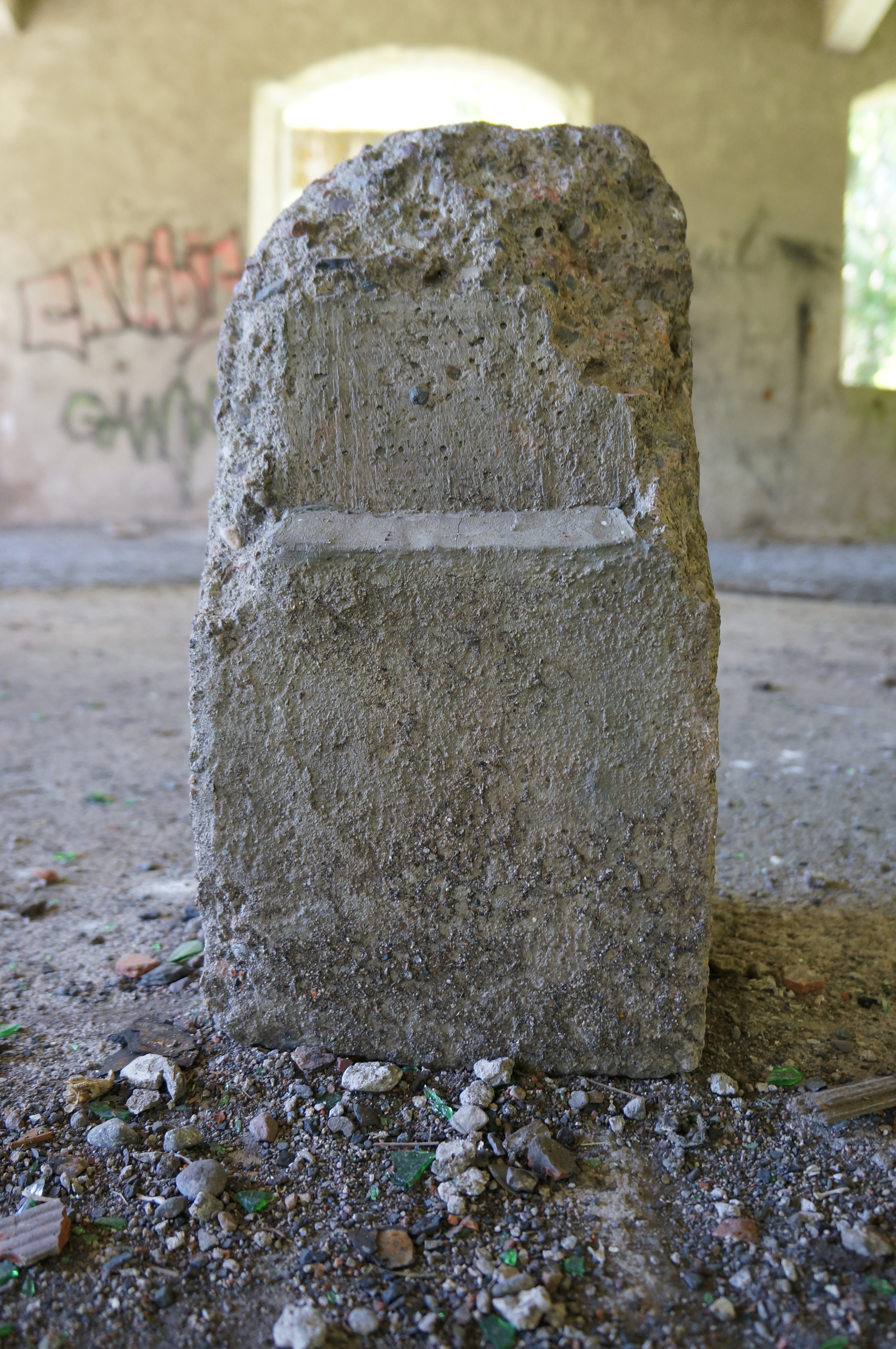
Shaft indicator.

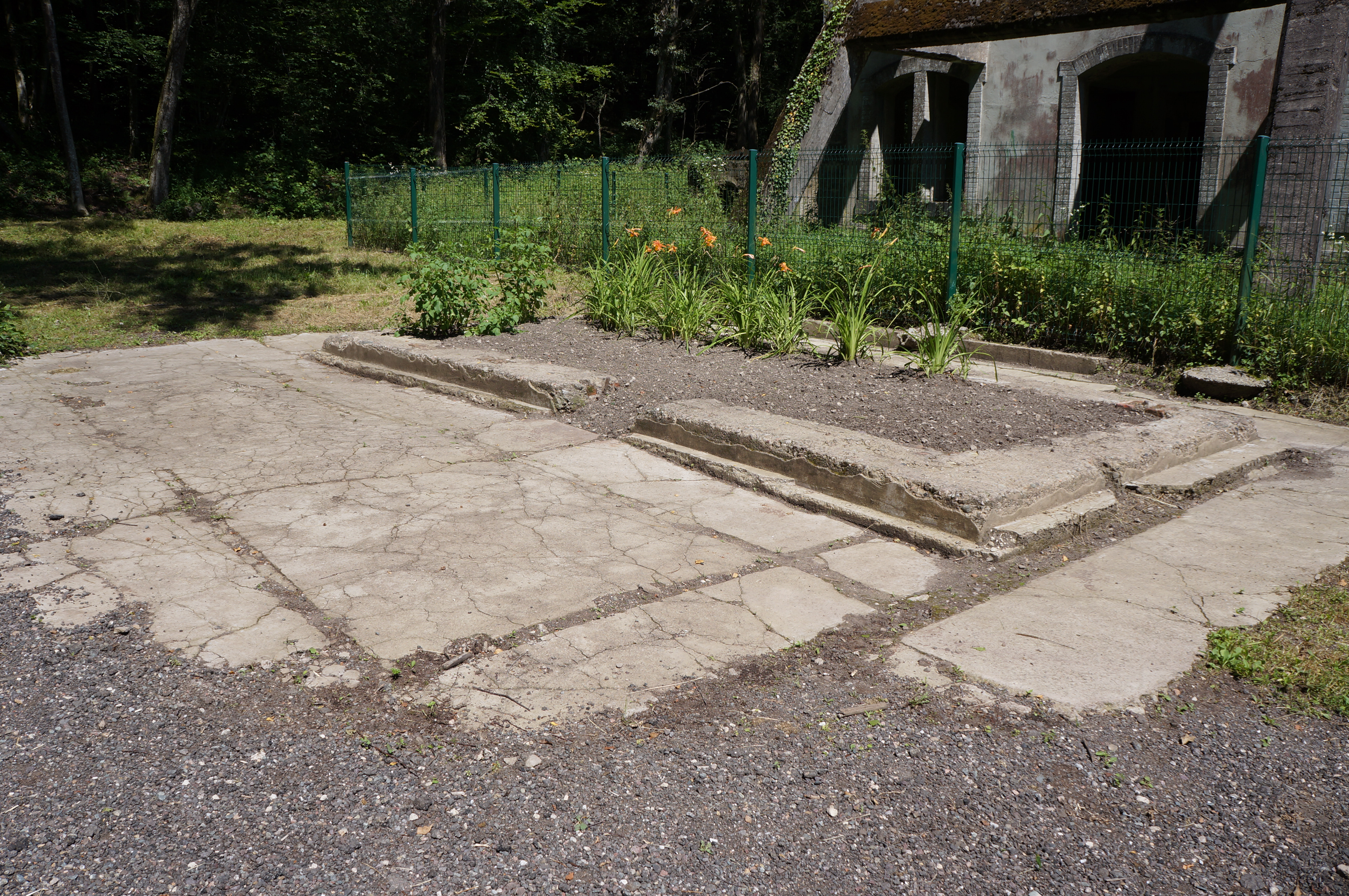
Old hoist building.

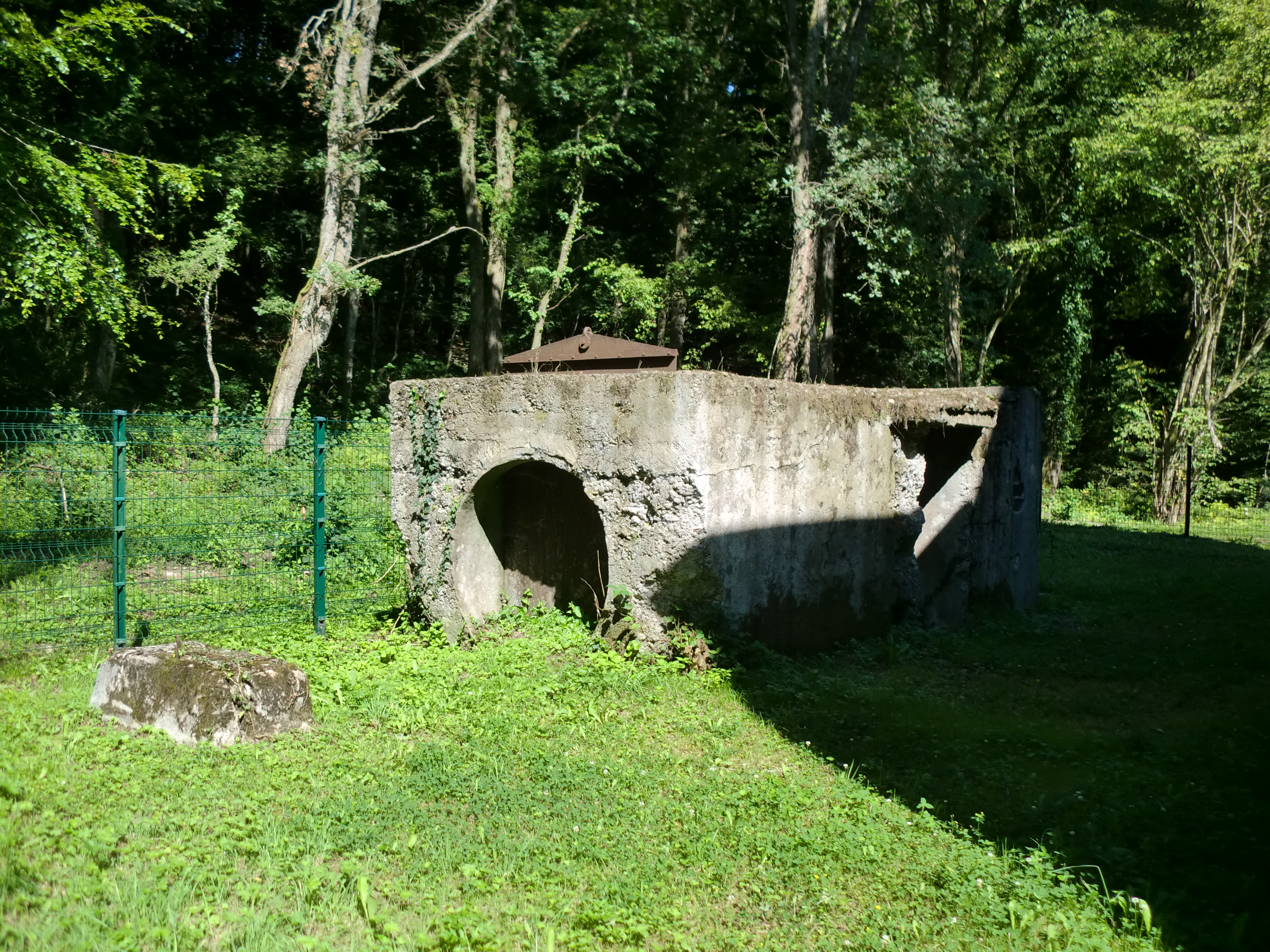
Remains of the fan.

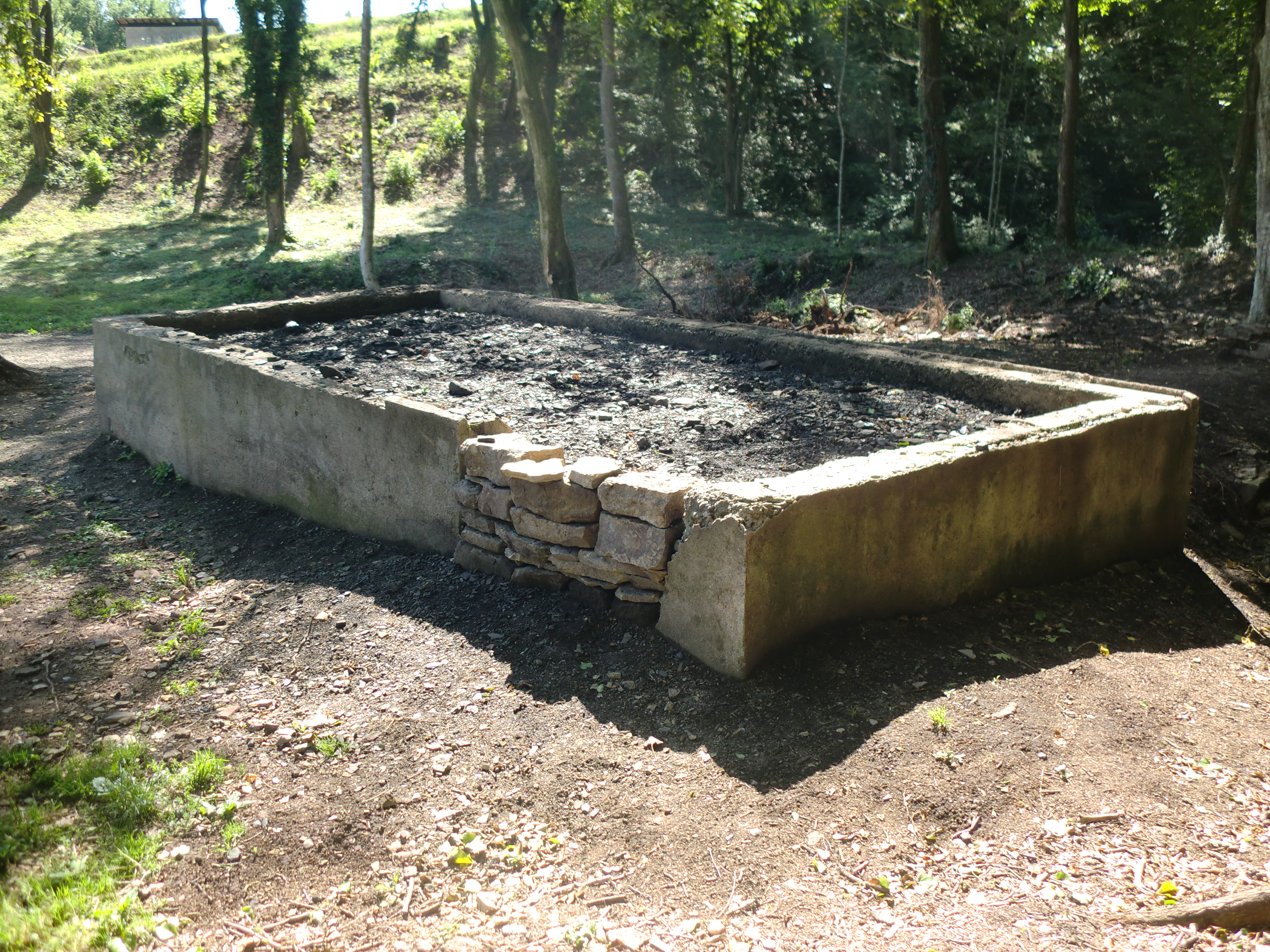
Remains of the control.

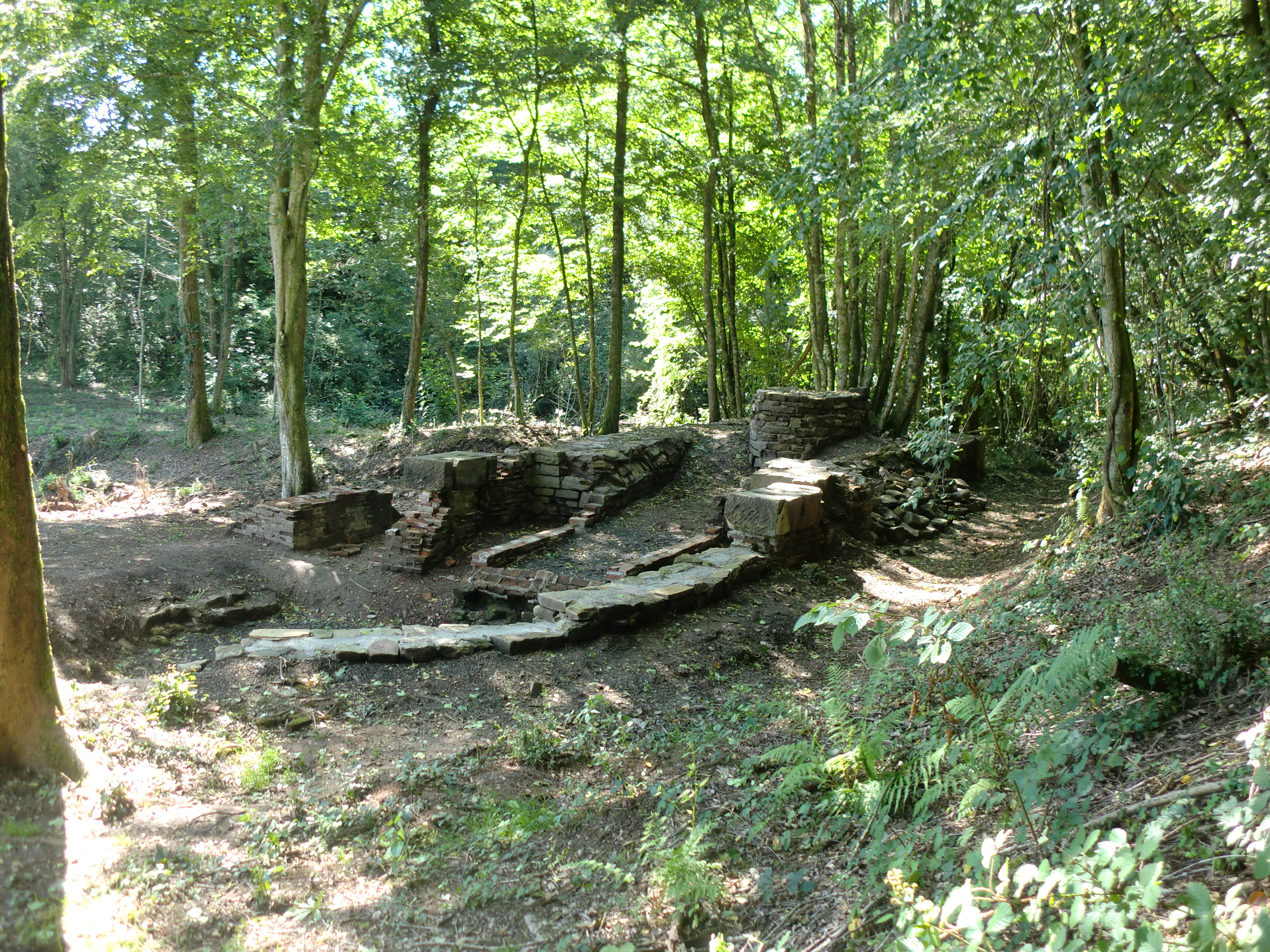
1864 boiler house.

Remains : 1. Headframe ; 2. Winding engine ; 3. Underground mine ventilation mechanical fan ; 4. Transformator ; 5. olds Steam engines and mechanicals fans.

== See also ==
- Ronchamp coal mines
- Arthur de Buyer Coal Mine
- Notre-Dame Mine Shaft
- Étançon mine
