= Bourlémont =

Hill in eastern France

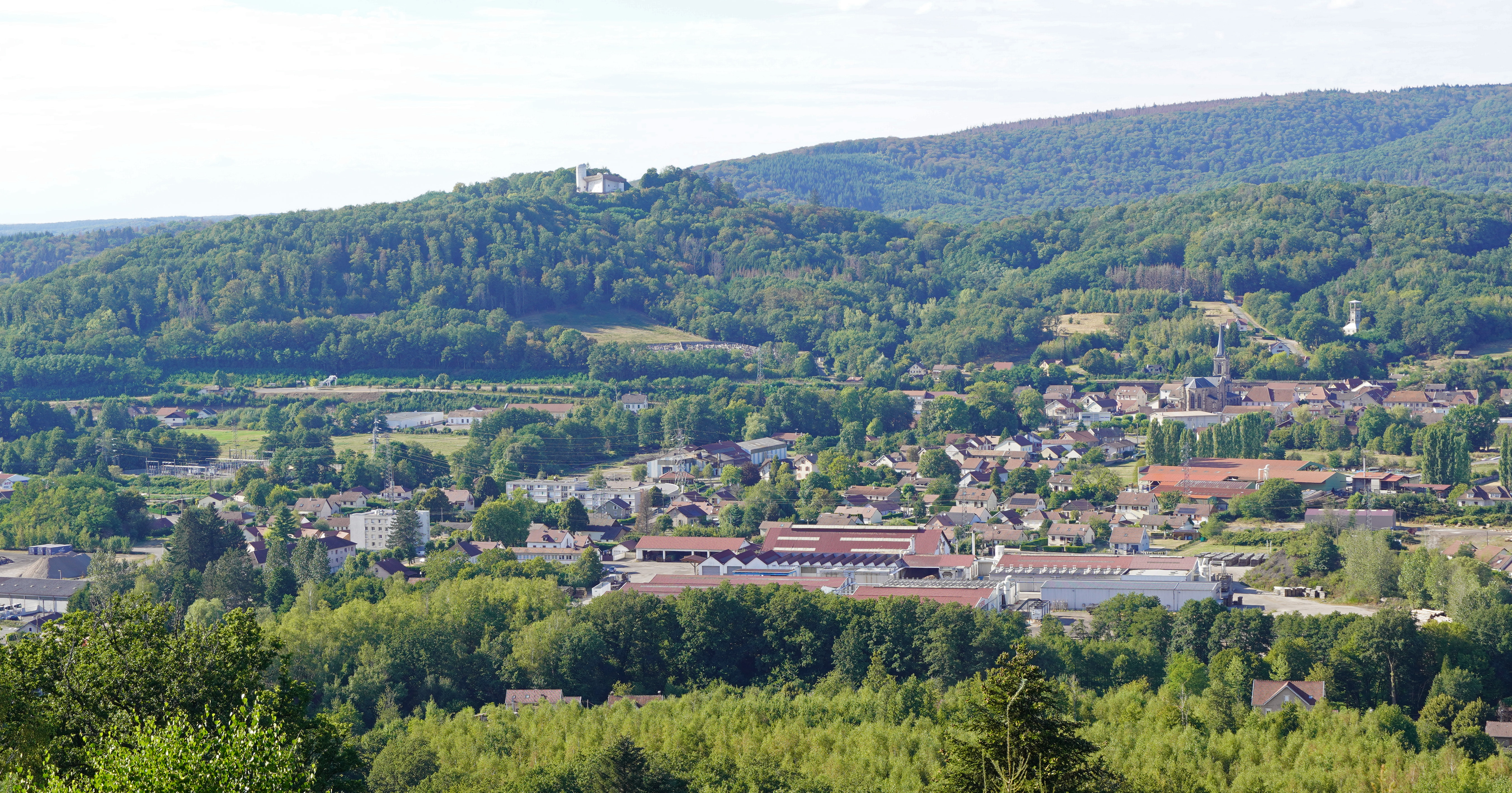
- Bourlémont overlooking Ronchamp

Highest point
- Elevation: 474 m (1,555 ft)
- Coordinates: 47°42′17″N 6°37′12″E

Geography
- Location within France
- Location: Ronchamp, Haute-Saône, Franche-Comté, France
- Parent range: Vosges

Bourlémont is a hill located in Ronchamp, Haute-Saône, eastern France with an elevation of 474 m (1,555 ft) above sea level. It is located in the Ballons des Vosges Nature Park, and is an area of cultural tourism, given that the chapel of Notre Dame du Haut is located on it.

== Toponymy ==
In the 18th century, Bourlémont was described as "Notre-Dame-de-Bourg-les-monts", which indicates that there was a fortified town on the hill. At the beginning of the nineteenth century, the hill was called the "Bourg Mountain".

== Geography ==
Bourlémont is located in Ronchamp, Haute-Saône, Franche-Comté, France. It can be accessed from Chapel Street on the southeastern side of the summit and the Way of the Cross footpath which was created in 1890. The GR 59 and Dukes hiking trails pass along the eastern side of the hill.

The hill has an altitude of 474 m (1,555 ft), meaning that it is 121 m (397 ft) higher than the centre of Ronchamp (353 m (1,158 ft)), which is at the foot of the hill.

Bourlémont is mainly composed of red sandstone, but there is also a presence of argillite, quartzite and shale. The climate of the hill has continental and oceanic influences, and it experiences very low winter temperatures.

== History ==
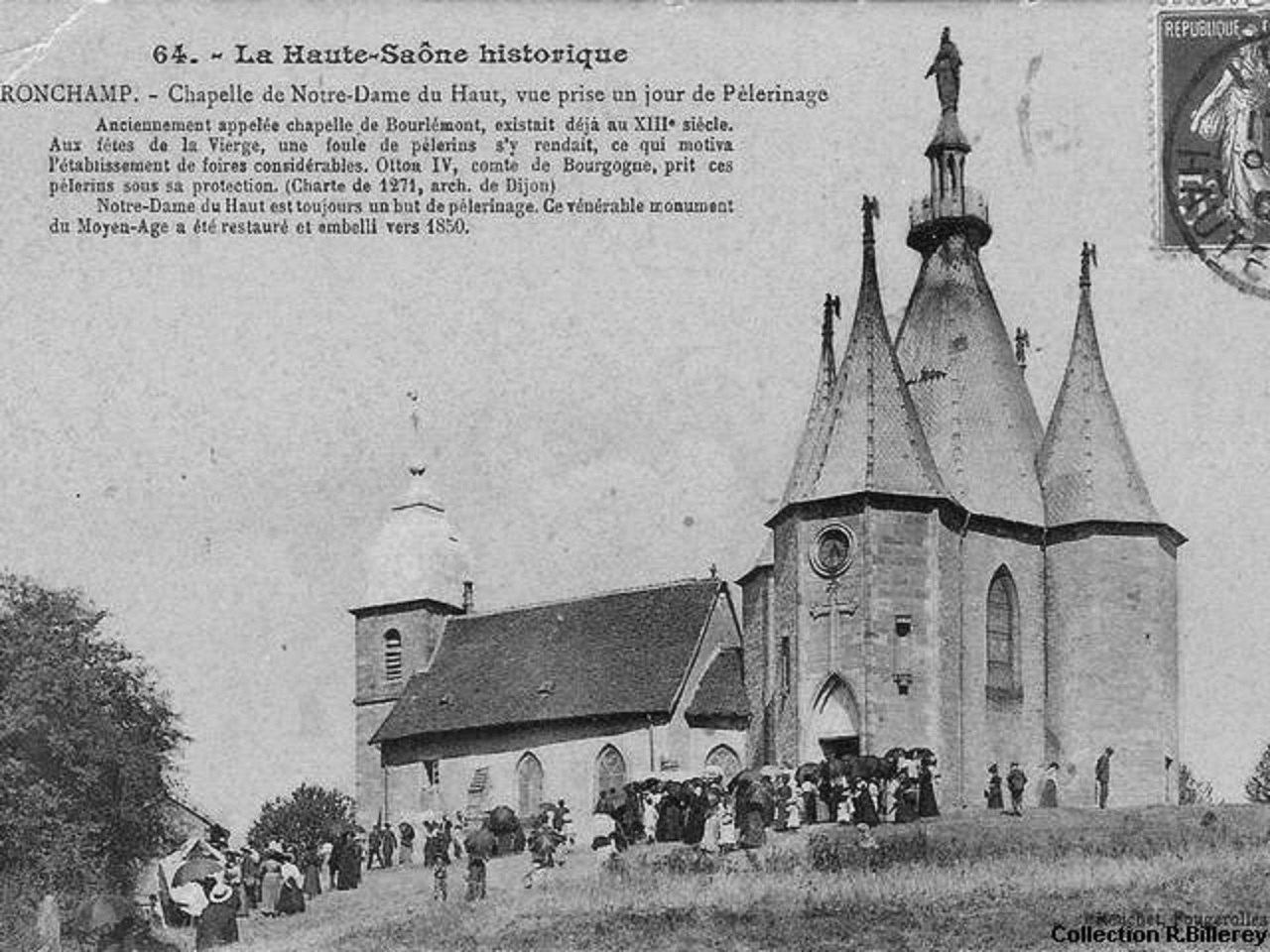
The chapel before 1913.

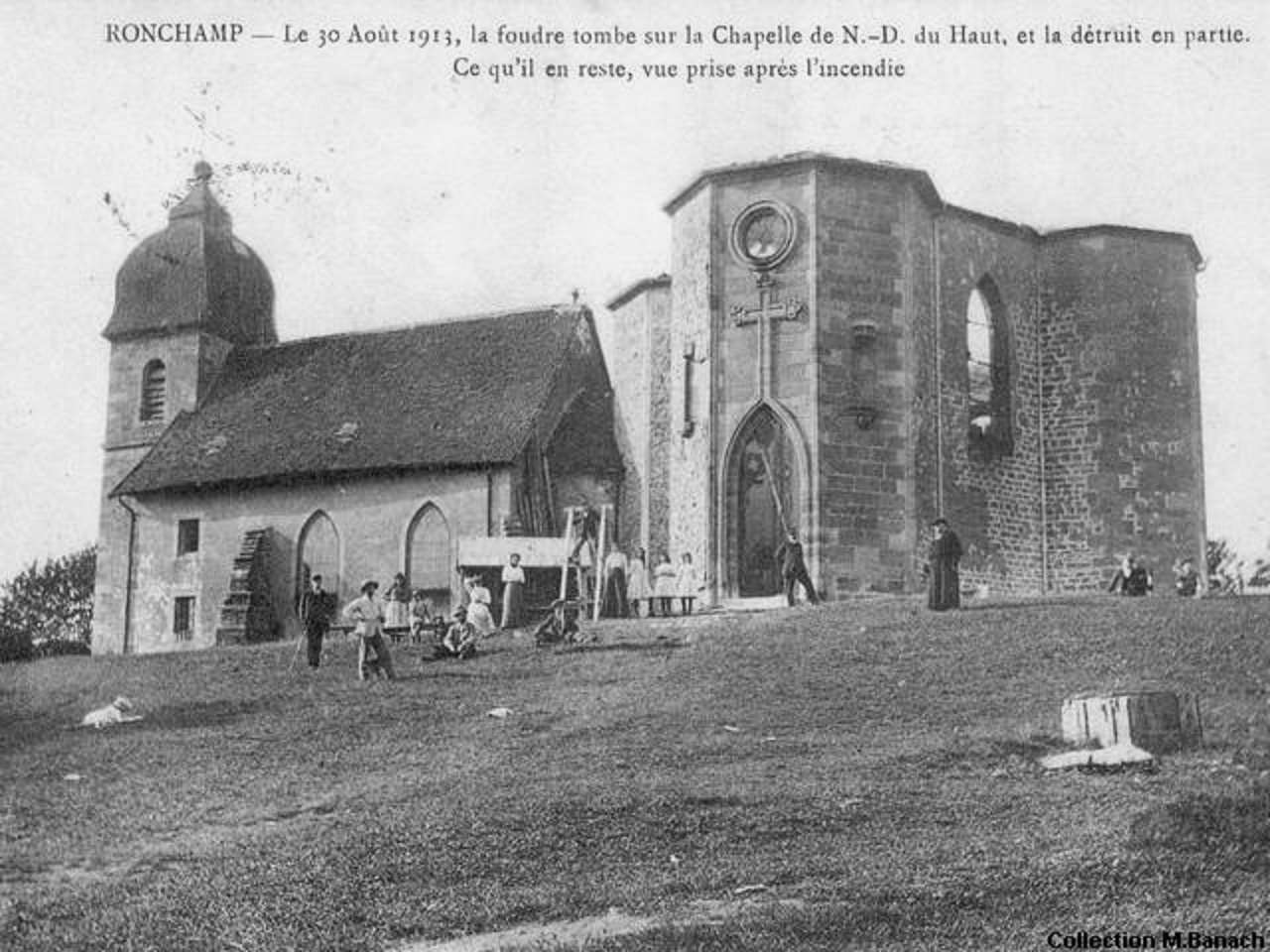
The chapel after the fire.

In ancient times, a Roman temple stood on top of the hill, and in 1092 a Catholic church was built at the same location. In the eighteenth century, gallows existed on the southern flank of the hill, the remains of which still exist. During the Thirty Years' War, Girardot de Noseroy considered building a fort on the hill, but these plans were abandoned given the maintenance cost and weather conditions.

At the start of the eighteenth century, the chapel on the hill was the only parish church in Ronchamp and the surrounding hamlets. During the French Revolution, ownership of the chapel changed many times. On 27 July 1796, it was sold to Jean-Jacques Marsault for 600 livres. On 28 January 1797 it was sold to Claude François Billy for 875 livre. In 1801, the chapel became a public place of worship, but remained guarded.

Between 1844 and 1857, a new shrine was constructed in the shape of a cross, which was 20 m (66 ft) long and 15 m (49 ft) wide, which was connected to the chapel. On 8 September 1873 the chapel held a large pilgrimage, where 30,000 people from Alsace, Lorraine and Franche-Comté visited the chapel. In the 1880s, a cottage was built near the chapel, which was occupied until the 1970s when it collapsed. A footpath was constructed in 1890 to assist hikers and pilgrims to reach the chapel, known as the Way of the Cross.

On 30 August 1913, a hail storm broke out above Ronchamp. At around 11am, the bell tower of the shrine was struck by lightning which triggered a fire, leaving only the stone walls of the sanctuary, but the chapel was untouched.

A new chapel was built on Bourlémont between 1950 and 1955, and in 1965 the chapel was registered as a monument historique.

On 29 March 2001, the headframe of Sainte Marie Coal Mine located in the hill was listed as a twentieth-century Monument historique.
