= Ronchamp coal mines =

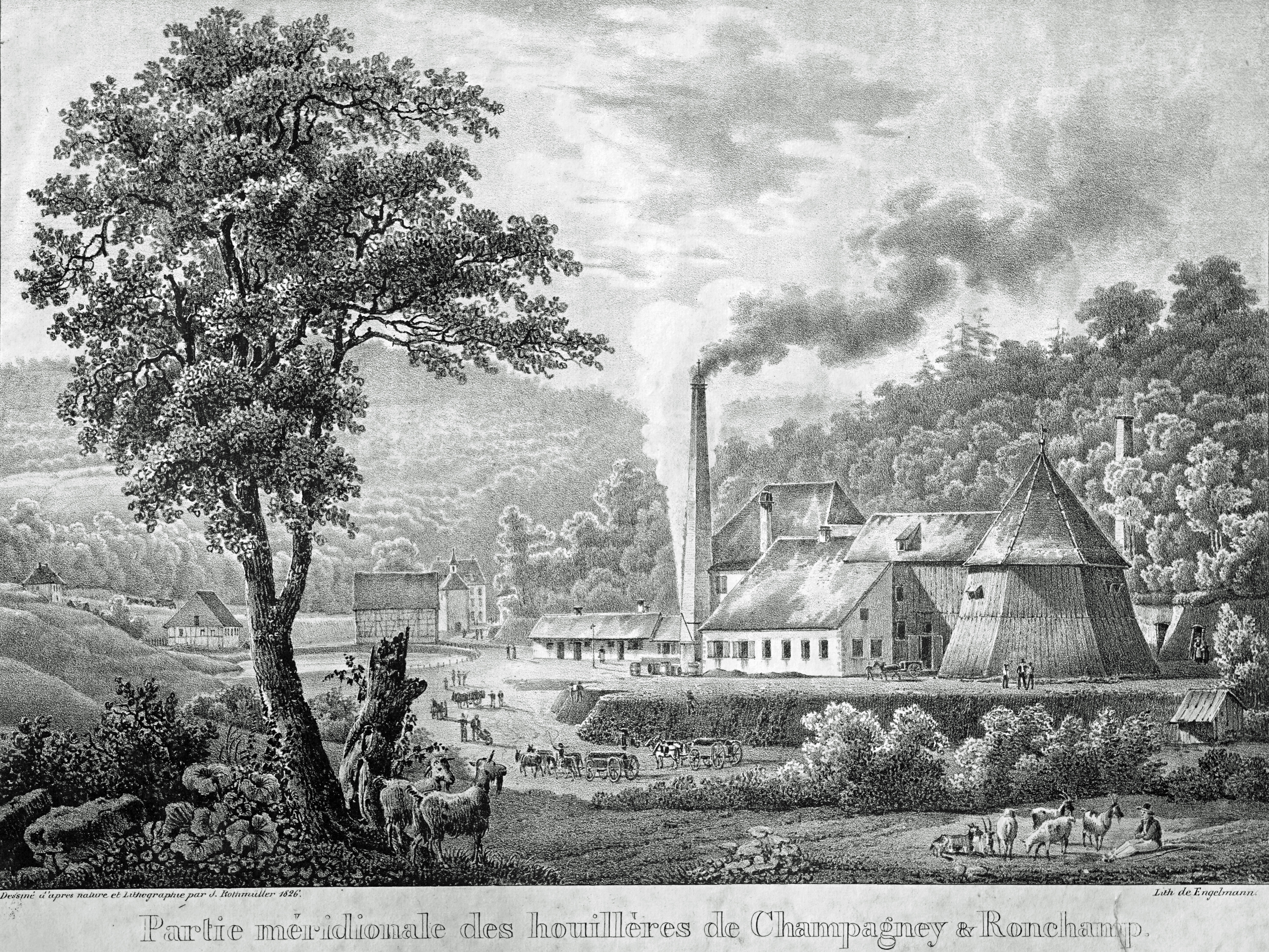
Coal mine Saint Louis.

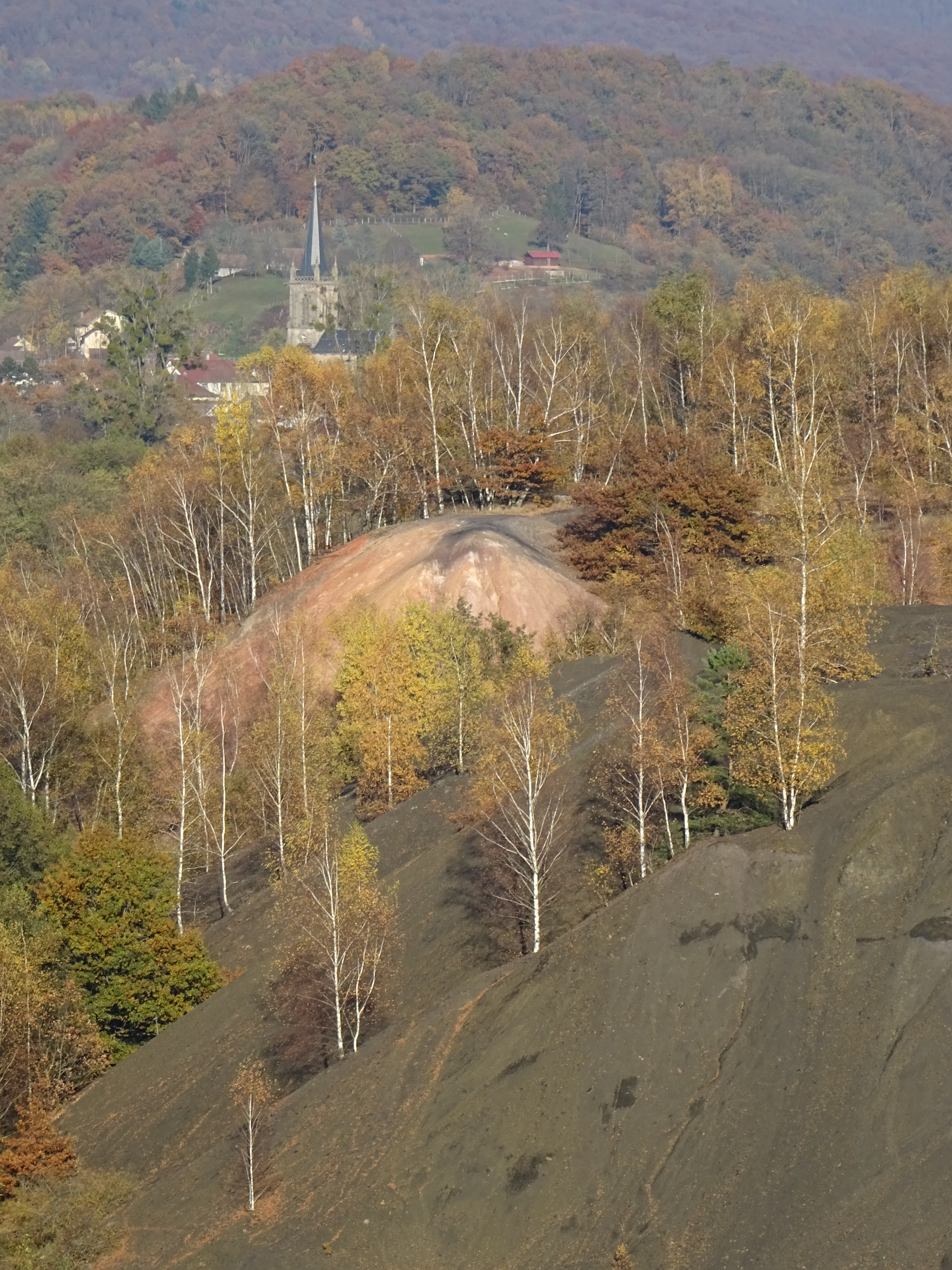
Spoil tip at Ronchamp colored red from subterranean combustion

The Ronchamp coal mines were an area of coal mines located in the Vosges and Jura coal mining basins, in eastern France. They covered three municipalities; Ronchamp, Champagney and Magny-Danigon. Operated for more than two centuries, from the mid-eighteenth century until the mid-twentieth century, they have profoundly changed the landscape, the economy and the local population.

Mining began in Ronchamp in the mid-18th century and had developed into a large industry by the late 19th century, employing 1500 people.

Extraction started in adit before being dug at coal mine Saint Louis in 1810, introducing the first real extraction mine-shaft. The shaft seams sunk more and more, and became deeper until the well, owned by (Civil Society coal Ronchamp), eventually became the deepest mine in France beating the coal mine du Magny (694 meters) in 1878 and the coal mine Arthur de Buyer (1010 meters) in 1900. After the nationalisation of mines in 1946, the shaft and the thermal power station was entrusted to Electricité de France.

After closing in 1958, the mining sites and infrastructures were demolished and workers had to convert to other professions. Later, a museum and two associations were created to preserve the memory of the mining heritage and several sites were redeveloped to become tourist attractions.

The museum looks back at the miner's work, their techniques, tools they used and their social life. A collection of miners lamps are also on display.

== Geography ==
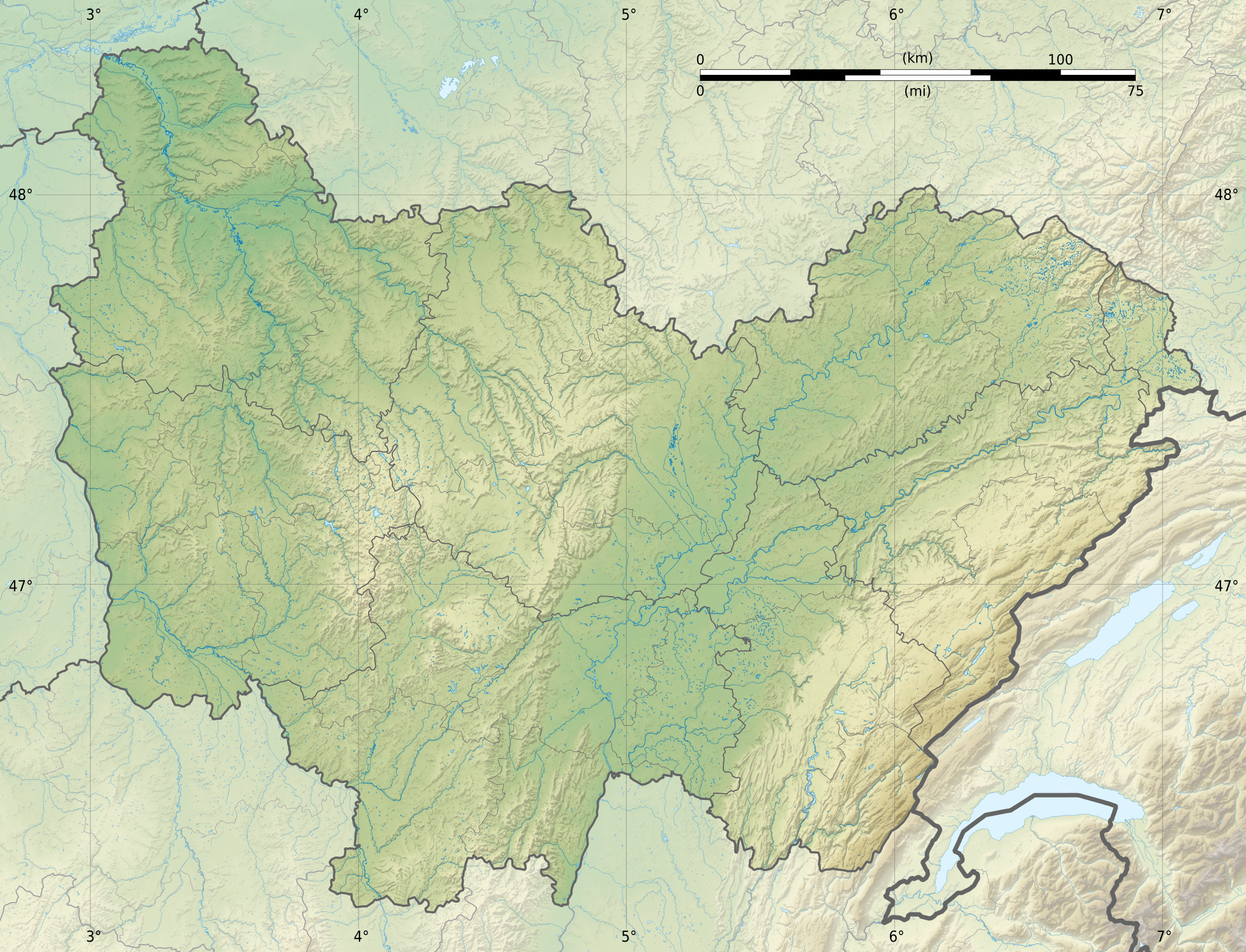
Location of Ronchamp, in the east of the department of Haute-Saône in the region of Bourgogne-Franche-Comté.

=== Situation ===
The zone exploited and influenced by the coal mines corresponds to the Ronchamp and Champagney mining basin which is at the heart of the Vosges and Jura coal mining basins, on the eastern part of the French department of the Haute-Saône, in the northern part of the French region of Bourgogne-Franche-Comté, close to Alsace and the industries of Mulhouse. The coal mines are then an essential source of energy for both regions. The Alsatian catchment area is between the towns of Mulhouse, Thann and Cernay.

The concession of Ronchamp, Champagney and Éboulet, where the mines are exploited, has 4503 hectares and includes the communes of Ronchamp, Champagney, Magny-Danigon, Clairegoutte, Andornay, Palante and La Côte (only the first three have coal mines). It is surrounded by the Mourière concession to the northwest, the Saint-Germain concession to the west and the Lomont concession to the south but also by other exploratory mines to the east.

== History ==
=== Beginning ===
Coal deposits were discovered in Ronchamp in the mid-18th century. Mining activity was a complementary resource for a population whose main occupation was agriculture. In 1744, two exploration galleries and various surface excavations were dug, but these works were unofficial. In 1749, the lord of Gensanne, owner of mines in Plancher-les-Mines and several mines in Alsace, sent a piece of coal to a laboratory in Besançon for analysis. It was in 1751 that several applicants for exploitation came forward. Among them, two local industrialists: the lord of Gensanne and François Guy, owner of a large forge in Magny-Vernois. In the end, none of them obtained a concession.

Two concessions were finally granted in 1757, the concession of the lords of Ronchamp in Ronchamp, granted on September 11, 1757, and the concession of the prince-abbots of Lure in Champagney, granted on April 21, 1757.

The decree of September 24, 1768 granted the barons of Ronchamp and associates the exclusive exploitation, for a period of about thirty years, of all the coal mines that are located within the extent of the barony of Ronchamp. The two concessions became one, and they were operated at common expense by the two concessionaires, who requested a single concession. This was granted by the decree of March 1, 1763.

== Mine list ==
Digging	Name	Depth	Activity	Function	Other functions
1810	Coal mine Saint-Louis	135 m	1823 – 1842	Extraction	
1815	Coal mine Henri IV	61 m	1816 – 1835	Extraction	
1822	Coal mine Samson	19 m	1824	Extraction	
1825	Coal mine #1	164 m	1827 – 1833	Extraction	
1825	Coal mine #2	156 m	1828 – 1833	Extraction	
1825	Coal mine #3	38 m	1826 – 1829	Extraction	
1829	Coal mine #4	45 m	1830 – 1841	Extraction	
1830	Coal mine #5	74 m	1832	Research	
1832	Coal mine #6	66 m	1834 – 1836	Extraction	Ventilation 1839-1850
1839	Coal mine #7	205 m	1843 – 1849	Extraction	Ventilation 1849-1872
1845	Coal mine Saint Charles / #8	315 m	1847 – 1895	Extraction	
1850	Coal mine Saint Joseph	453 m	1855 – 1895	Extraction	
1851	Coal mine Notre Dame d'Éboulet	564 m	1859 – 1896	Extraction	Drainage 1896-1958
1854	Coal mine Saint Jean	51 m	1856	Research	
1854	Coal mine Sainte Barbe	324 m	1860 – 1872	Extraction	Ventilation of coal mine Sainte-Pauline
1854	Coal mine Sainte Pauline	546 m	1861 – 1884	Extraction	
1855	Coal mine de l'Espérance	103 m	1858	Extraction	
1864	Coal mine Sainte Marie	359 m	1866 – 1869	Extraction	Ventilation 1869-1958
1866	Coal mine Saint Georges	470 m	1870 – 1873	Extraction	
1873	Coal mine du Magny	694 m	1878 – 1958	Extraction	Service 1916-1928
1873	Coal mine du Chanois	588 m	1900 – 1951	Extraction	
1883	Coal mine du Tonnet / #9	574 m	1886 – 1888	Extraction	
1884	Coal mine #10	247 m	1886 – 1896	Ventilation	
1892	Coal mine Arthur de Buyer / #11	1 010 m	1900 – 1954	Extraction	
1949	Coal mine de l'Étançon / #13 bis	44 m	1950 – 1958	Extraction	

== Picture ==
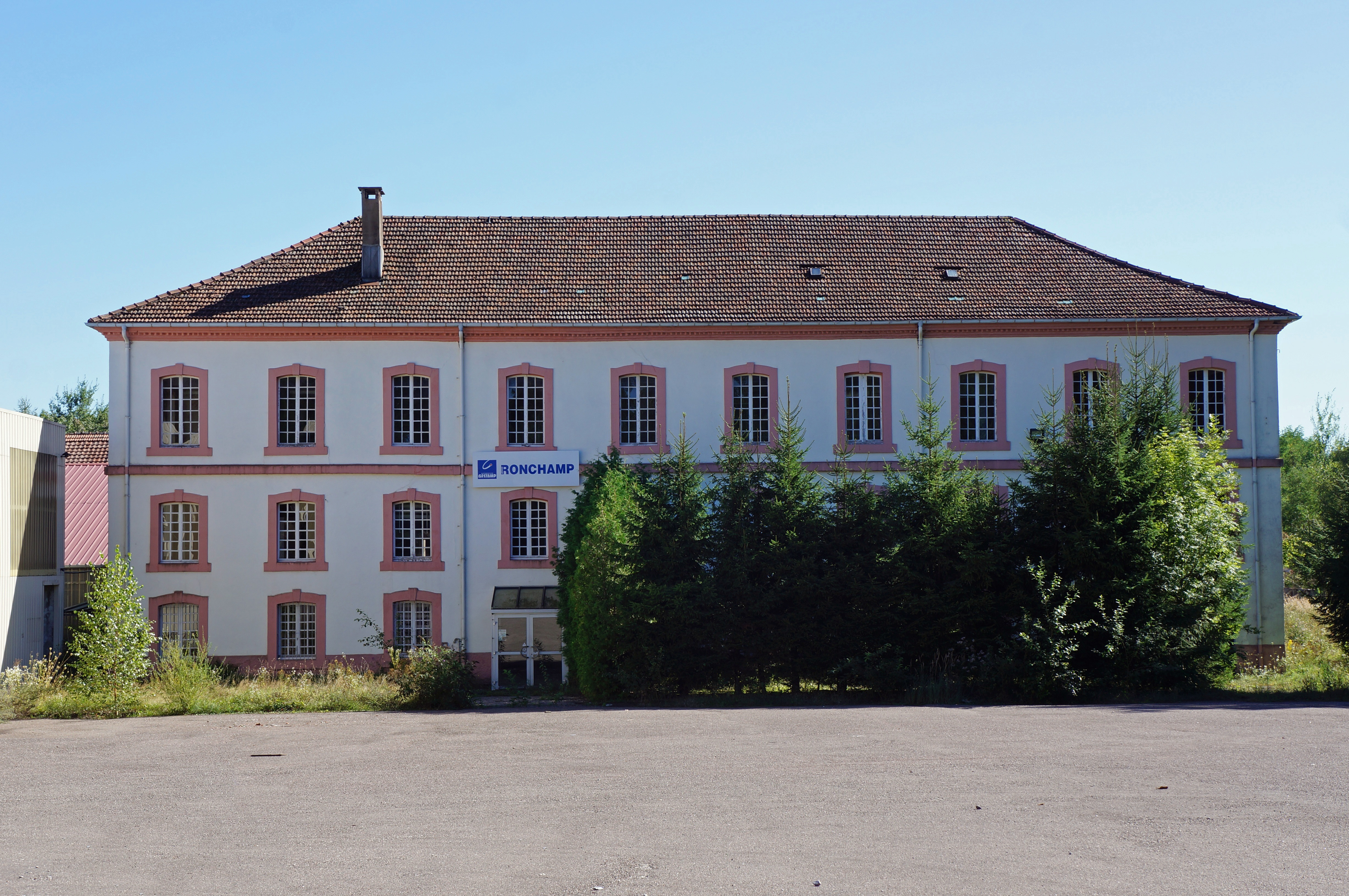
The offices of the Coal mine of Ronchamp (2012).

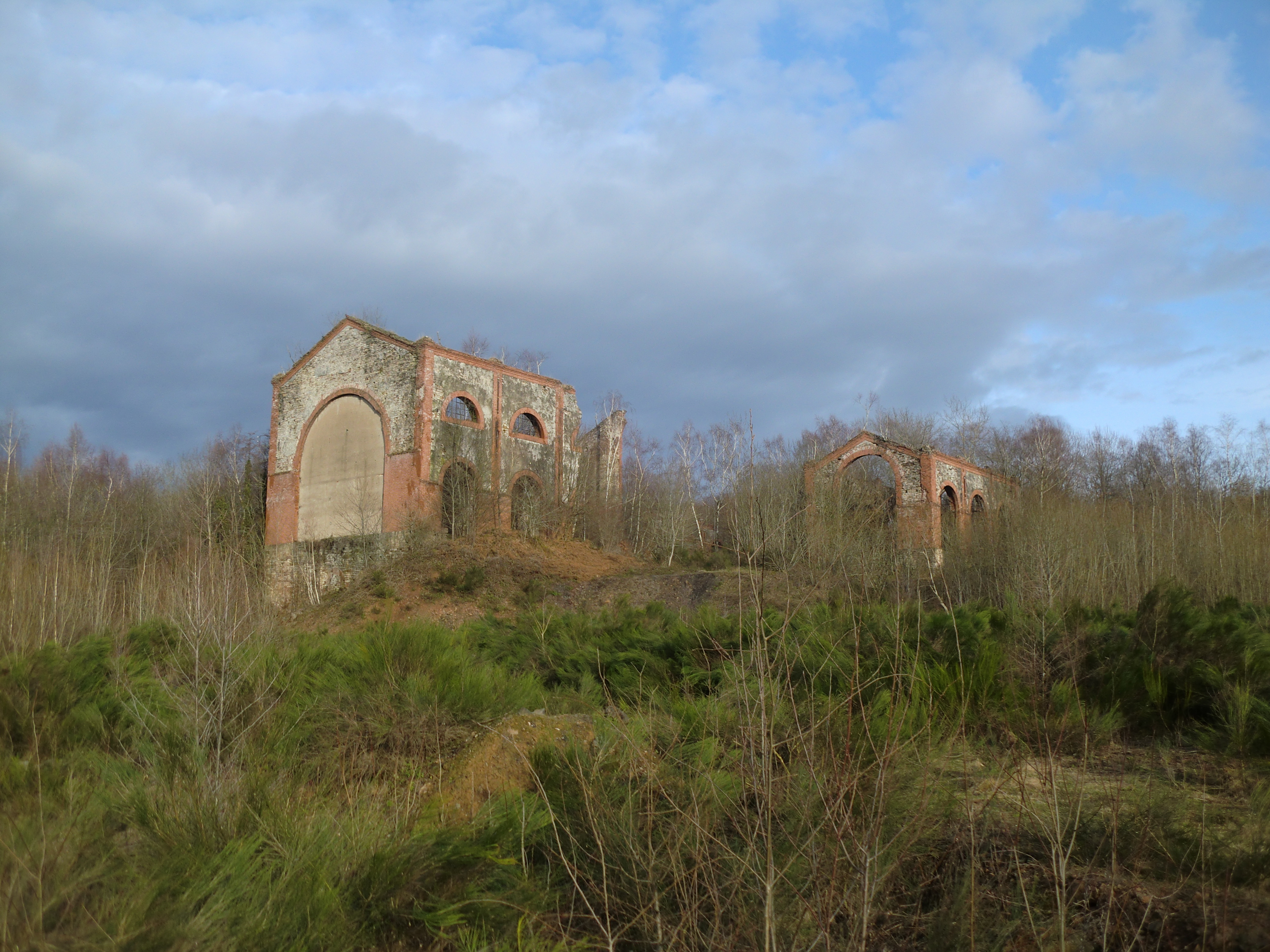
Coal mine Arthur de Buyer ruin.

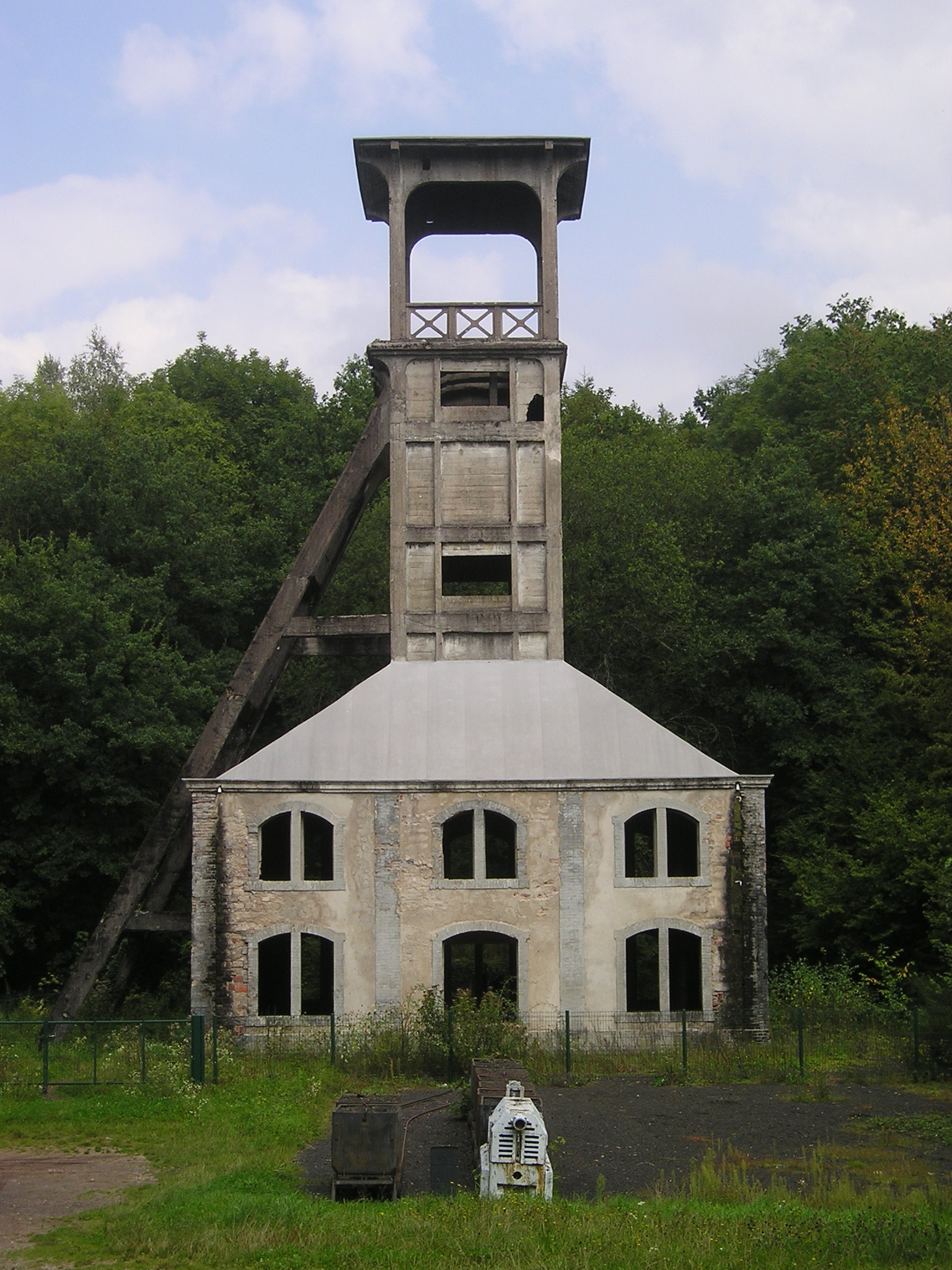
Coal mine Sainte-Marie in 2007.

== Sources ==
- Godard, Michel (2012). Enjeux et impacts de l'exploitation minière du bassin houiller de Ronchamp (1810-1870) [Issues and Impacts of Mining in the Ronchamp Coalfield (1810-1870)] (PDF) (in French). University of Technology of Belfort-Montbéliard.

== See also ==
- Ronchamp coal mine railway
- Notre-Dame Mine Shaft
- Arthur de Buyer Coal Mine
- Sainte Marie Coal Mine
- Sainte-Barbe Coal Mine
- Hamlet of La Houillère
- The large drainage channel of the Ronchamp coal mines
- Mining basin of Ronchamp and Champagney
- Saint-Charles shaft
- Thermal power station of Ronchamp

=== External links ===
- (in French) Les amis du musée de la mine.
- English website about the Coal mine of Ronchamp
