= Notre-Dame Mine Shaft =

Notre-Dame Mine Pit
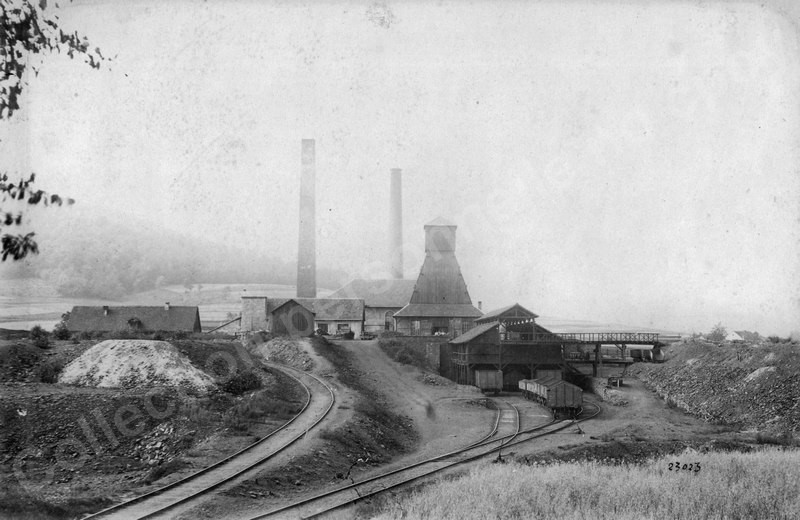
- The Notre-Dame Mine Pit in operation circa 1884
- Interactive map of Notre-Dame Mine Pit
- Location: Champagney, Haute-Saone, France; 47.690042°N 6.648059°E
- Products: Coal
- Opened: 1851
- Closed: 1896
- Company: Société des Houillères de Ronchamp (Ronchamp Mining Company)
- Acquired: 1851

The Notre-Dame (or Éboulet) Pit was one of the principal mine shafts of the Ronchamp Mining Company (les Houillères de Ronchamp), located in North-Eastern France in the hamlet of Éboulet, the commune of Champagney, and the department of Haute-Saône. The pit was created by a rival company, The Forge Masters (la Société des maîtres de forges), which had owned the hamlet of Éboulet's mines since 1851, fifteen years before the Ronchamp Mining Company acquired them. As its supply of coal dwindled, the mine was converted into a water well used for pumping water used in the mining process to several other nearby mines. The pit was plugged in 1958, when all the coal mines formerly owned by Ronchamp were closed by the government utility, Électricité de France.

Three miner towns, a dormitory, and a reservoir of potable water were constructed around the mine pit in the interwar period. A slag heap towards the north remained until the beginning of the 20th century, leaving behind two slabs of concrete and the floor of a no longer existent building.

== Excavation ==
The excavation of the pit was undertaken by the Éboulet Mining Company on December 14, 1851, with a cross-section of 6.6m × 2.5m with a pair of 2m × 2m extraction compartments. In 1855, 31 workers—21 miners, five assistants, two machinists and two blasters—worked in the 135 meter deep well. A year later, excavation was suspended at a depth of 270 meters in order to conduct a survey; this determined the presence of coal at about 495 meters.

On 1 August 1859, at 501 meters, the pit crossed a vein of coal 80 centimeters thick, which did not meet company standards. According to their surveys, they believed there must be coal at a depth of 550 to 600 meters, and moreover that there would be only one relatively thin vein. The engineers therefore assessed that the Notre-Dame excavations had run into a slab of the basin's bedrock. Explorations were rapidly undertaken, but executed badly. In 1861, poor ventilation caused an explosion of methane, which resulted in three deaths. The explorations were then stopped in order to rework the mine and its galleries, but above all to dig a ventilation shaft.

In 1861 began the digging of the first ventilation shaft in the region. The fan-powered shaft was two meters in diameter, and was placed 30 meters away from the mine shaft. On January 2, 1862, three workers died of asphyxiation following an unexplained explosion at the bottom of the mine.

== Surface facilities ==
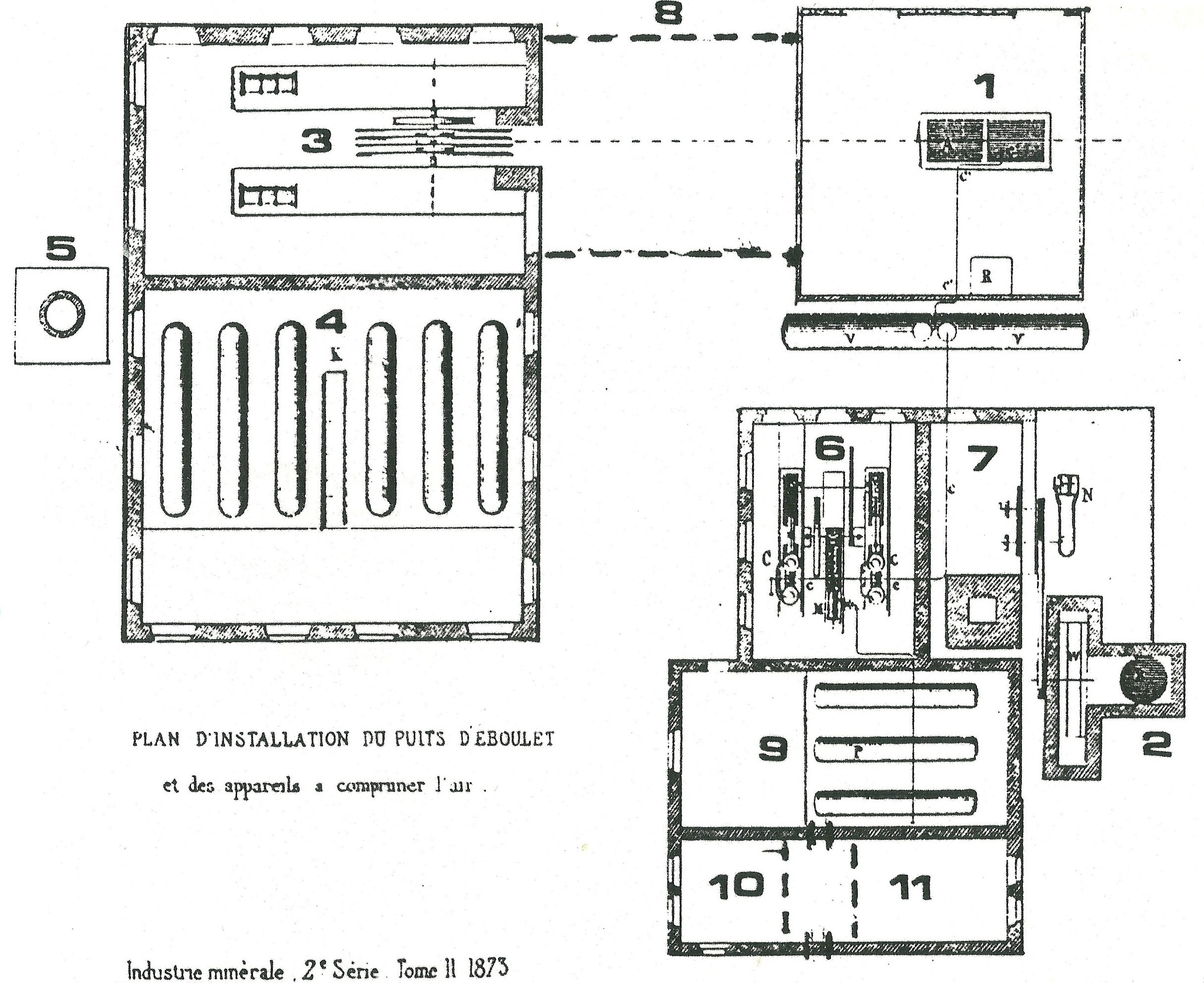
Layout of the buildings of the Notre-Dame Mine Pit: 1. Mine Shaft; 2. Ventilation Shaft; 3. Coal Extraction Apparatus; 4. Boilers; 5. Chimney; 6. Compressor; 7. Ventilator; 8. Expansion of 1881; 9. Reservoirs of Compressed Air; 10. Lamp workshop; 11. Swimming Pool

When Ronchamp acquired the Notre-Dame pit, the extant buildings, poorly designed in the first place, were in poor condition. The steam engine which powered the extracting machine was composed of gears and two cylinders of different diameters, one of 60 cm, the other 70 cm, which caused instability and necessitated frequent repair. The wooden headframe was dilapidated, and the framework of the shaft was falling to pieces . As for ventilation, its flat-bladed ventilator could only manage a flow rate of 7 m^{3}/s, insufficient for a deep mine shaft.

In 1867, the facilities were completely renovated. A new 100 horse-power direct-traction extraction machine and two cylinders with a diameter of 70 cm and a run of two meters, accompanied by six steam generators 8 meters long, were ordered by A. Kœchlin and Company to be installed in a building placed at a right angle to the other and topped by a tall chimney .

The pit was also outfitted with a new, more powerful ventilator, an air compressor, the only source of mechanical energy at the bottom of the mine, a lamp shop, and a "swimming pool" for the miners. Additionally, a hundred mine carts capable of carrying 400 kg each were purchased to replace the old 300 kg-capacity carts, which were transferred to the Saint-Charles mine, where they replaced the old, wooden wagons of the more primitive extraction elevator. In total, the Coal Mines of Ronchamp invested 164,000 francs to ready the Notre-Dame mine for extraction.

== Exploitation ==
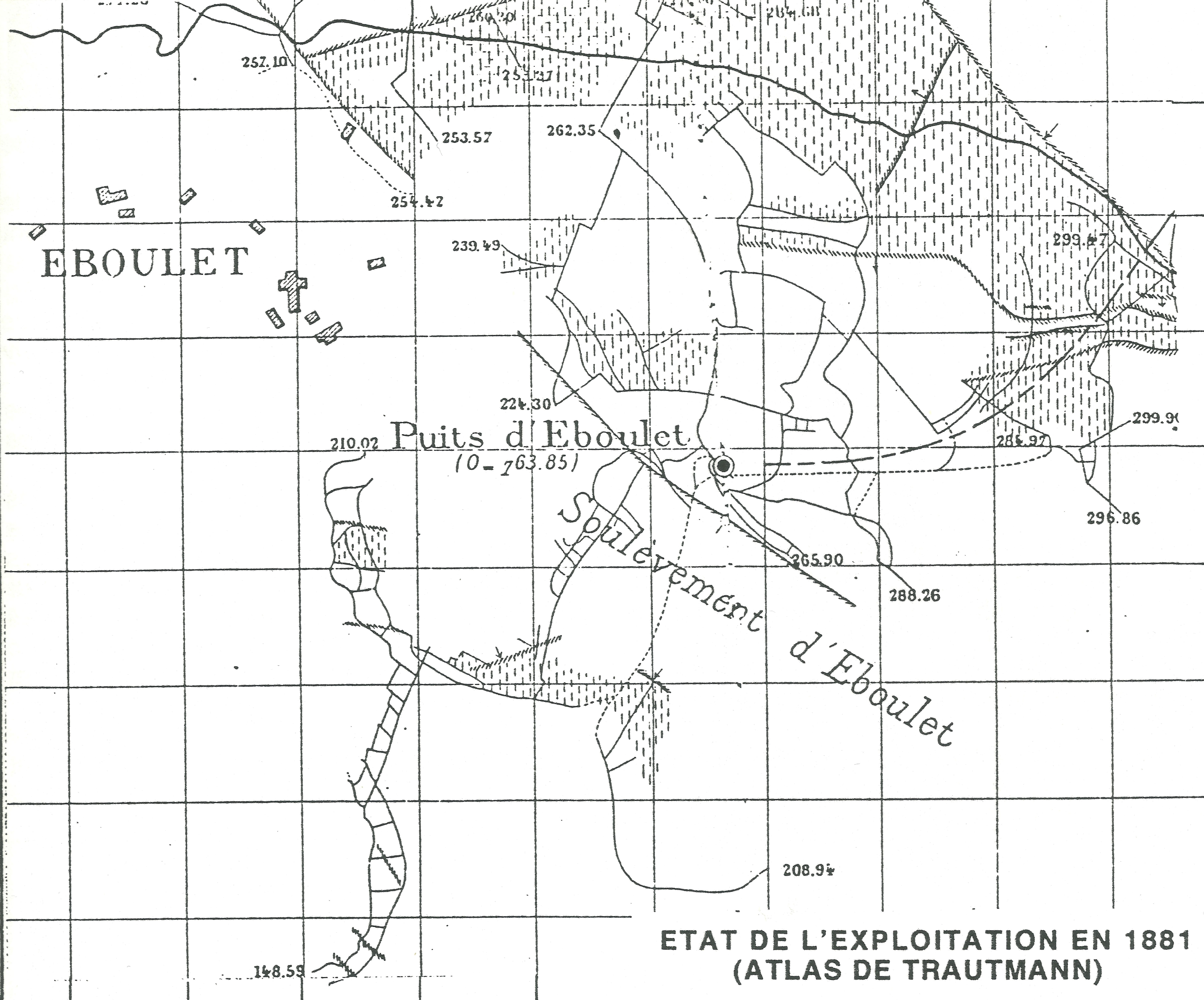

By 1864, the Notre-Dame mine was working at full capacity, with 400 workers, of whom 90 were hewers producing up to 100 tons per day . It being the sole active mine from the annexed Éboulet territory, it was made to function as two extraction mines, with two dedicated, independent compartments possessing separate extraction machines. A master miner from an English-speaking country headed this project, but the mine suffered from faulty lining and poor reinforcement, necessitating numerous repairs and the abandonment of double-extraction.

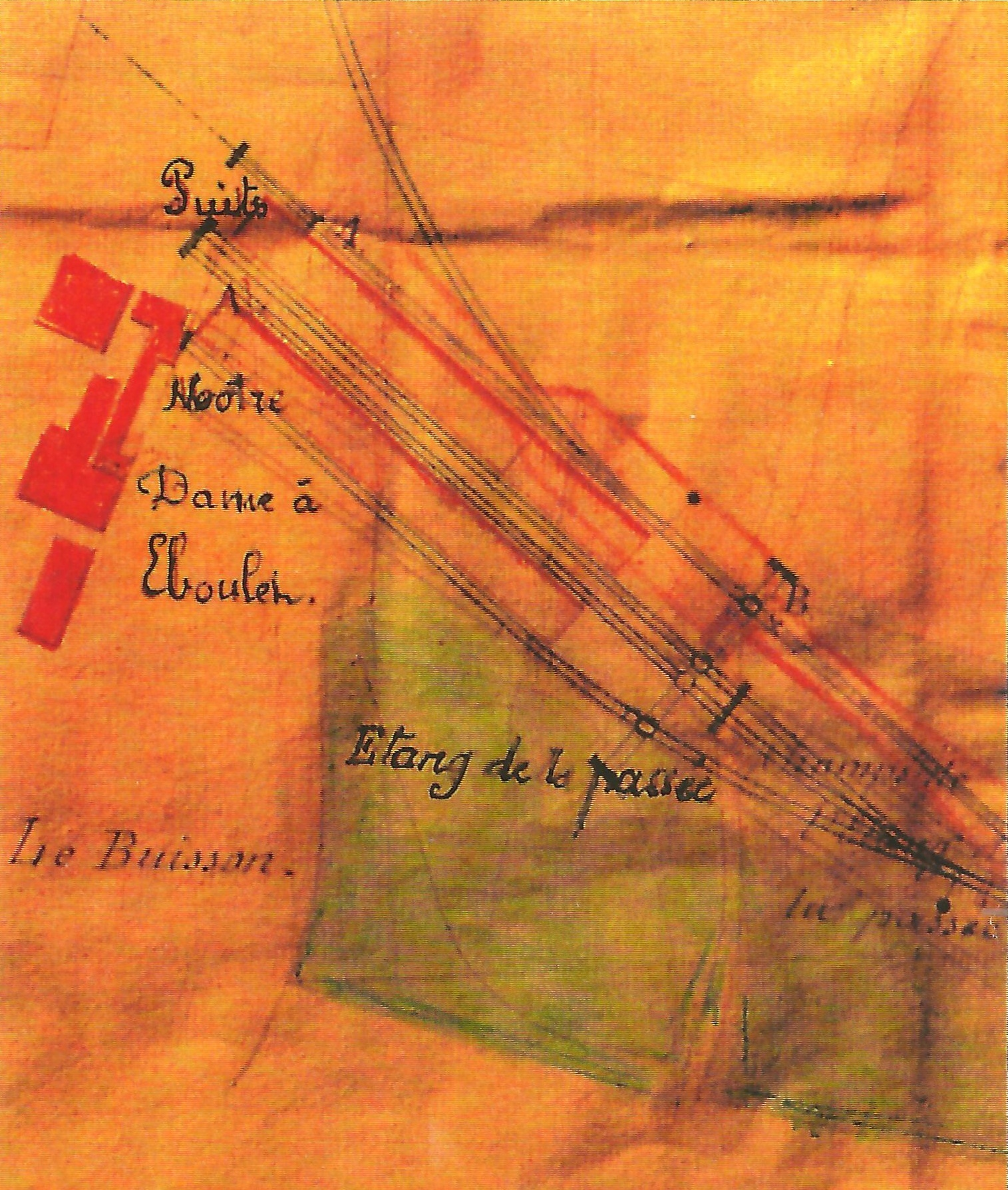
Railroads serving the mine of Notre-Dame.

In 1865, the year before the Coal Mines of Éboulet merged into Ronchamp, the mine was linked to the coal mine railroad system by a railroad that transported the coal via the Paris–Mulhouse line. On 16 September 1867, all work was stopped in order to completely transform the mine facilities following a cable rupture. The 0.57 meter railroads were replaced by wider ones measuring 0.65 meters. Old wagons were transferred to the Saint-Charles mine. On the following 10 November, extraction recommenced with the new machine, new cages, new equipment, and 100 new 450 kg-capacity wagons.

In 1867, the mine was deepened to 564 meters, and a gallery was excavated which was to link it to the Saint-Joseph coal mine. In 1868, production dropped dramatically from 52,000 tons in 1867 to 28,000 tons the following year. Several factors led to this significant drop in production, one of the most significant being flooding resulting from the drilling of the new gallery leading towards the Saint-Joseph pit. Work had to be stopped for two months, which resulted in difficulties in recommencing exploitation. In 1869, the exploitation of the gallery at 520m began, where a vein existed that was two meters thick. But this coal bed was interrupted by two fissures to the North and West, and by a raise to the east. New explorations were therefore undertaken to the south where the coal beds descended.

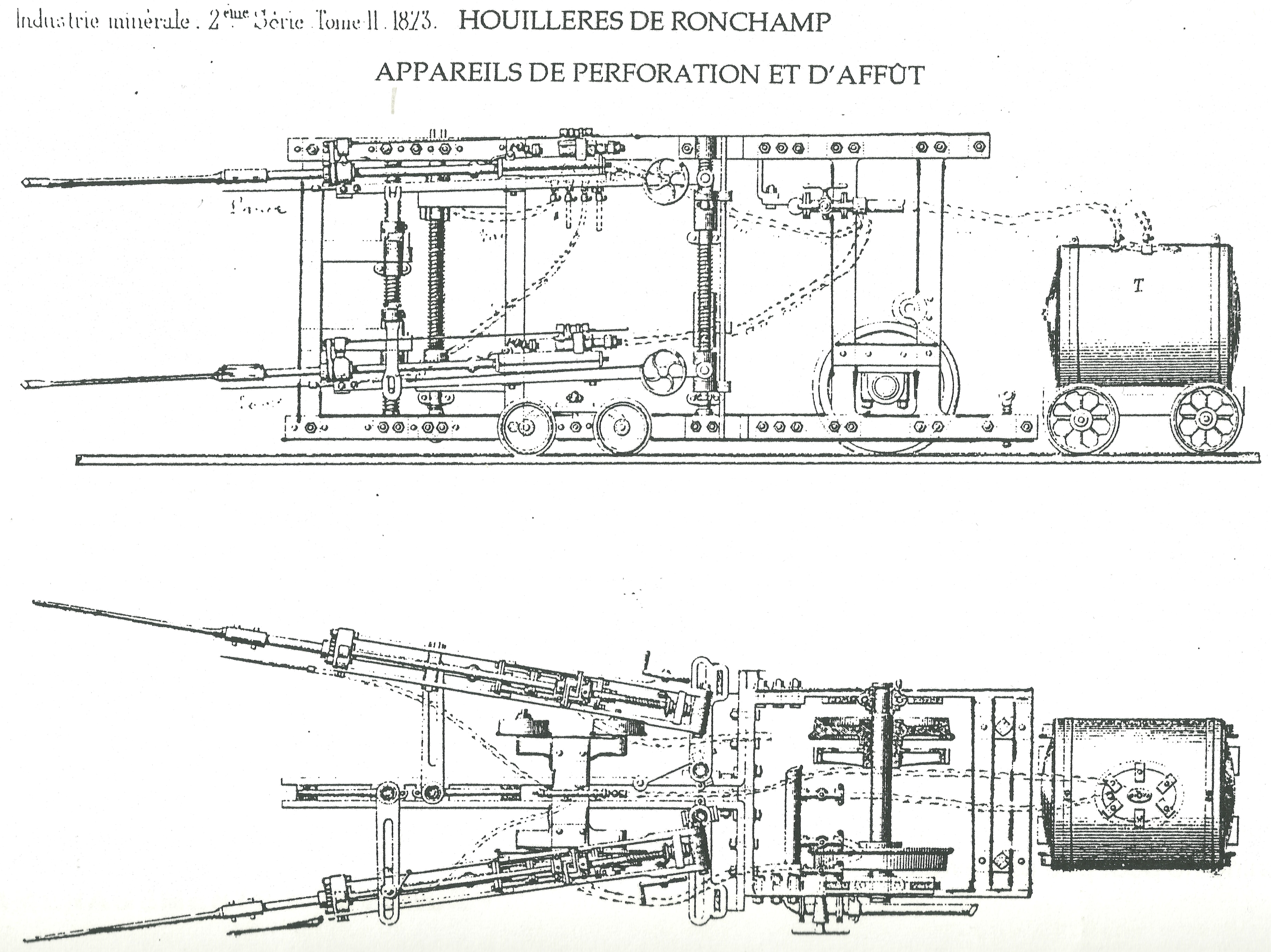
The Pneumatic Boring Machine

In 1871, a compressed air machine was used for the drilling of the southern passage at the bottom of the Notre-Dame pit, the first of its kind in France. The passage was finished on 13 May 1872, and coal was found . In the 1870s, the amount of water in the Notre-Dame mine shaft increased considerably, passing from 66 m^{3} per day in 1874 to 1,100 m^{3} in 1879. More water was being removed from the shaft than coal.

In 1875, director-engineer Mathet, leaving the Ronchamp mining district for the coal mines of Blanzy, expressed doubt concerning the future productivity of the pit. He believed that the reserves of usable coal were limited, but that there was potential value in Southeastern explorations, in the direction of the mine shaft of l'Espérance. According to him, deepening the shaft another fifty meters and digging another gallery in that direction could prolong the life of the mine by another ten years.

On 1 September 1880, a 10-meter chunk of the mine wall detached, crumbled, and crushed the receiving level, trapping two miners below. They were trapped in the mine for a week, but emerged alive. From 1880 to 1881, the facilities of the Notre-Dame Mine were completely reworked. The pit was restored and a locker room and a wooden building between the machine room and the receiving room were constructed. In 1892, a significant bed was discovered behind a rising stratum of rock, but two years later a number of flaws appeared. The mine of Notre-Dame would soon be closed, its resources being effectively depleted. In 1896, the mine was abandoned but not yet plugged.

== Water pump ==
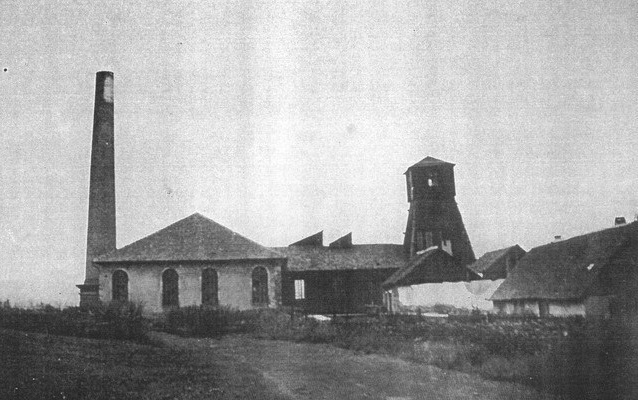
Buildings just after mining stopped

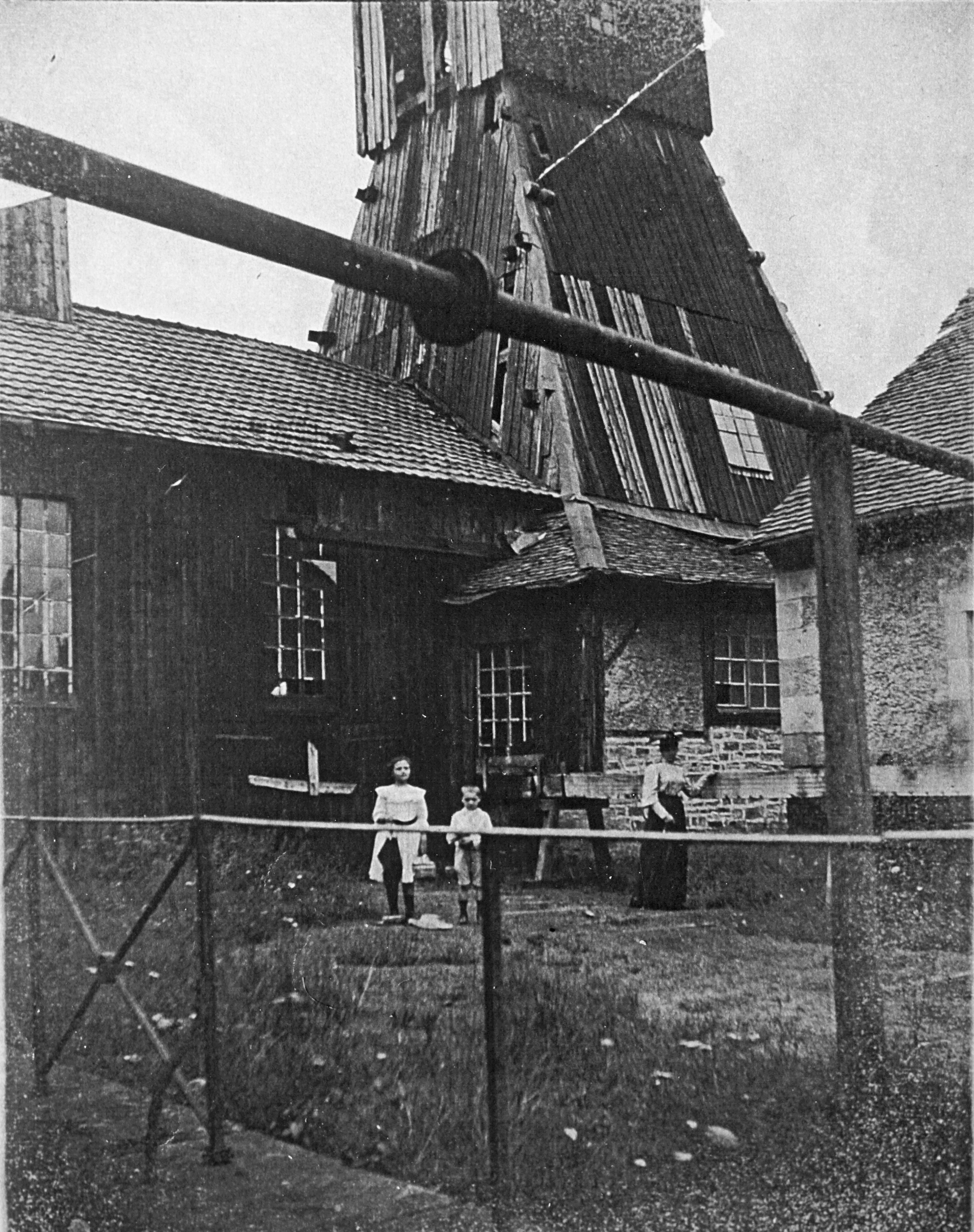
The headframe around 1900

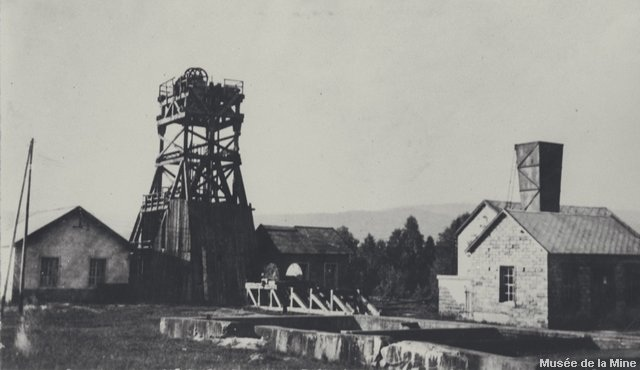
The Notre-Dame Pit between the wars

By 1903, coal mining had ceased at the Notre-Dame pit, but it had not been filled, and a few workers were still present. The pit was preserved for use as a water pump for the coal mines of Ronchamp. All of the excavations, whether active or not, were connected to one another, and water flowed towards the new southern passageways.

In 1922, the company decided to revisit an abandoned mass of coal with a width of 150 meters that had been left intact to serve as flood prevention for the more recent excavations. The decision was made to mine this coal. Draining commenced on 13 October 1925 and was completed in 1927. Before beginning excavations, however, a link to the Chanois mine had to be established. This new linkage, finished in 1930, became the 1,500-meter-long Cameroun gallery. The extracted coal was sent to the Chanois Mine, where adequate infrastructure existed, and the Notre-Dame mine served two purposes: pumping 7,000 tons of water per month and serving as the downcast shaft by which air entered the underground, the Sainte-Marie shaft, with its powerful ventilators, serving as the upcast shaft.

In 1944, the battles for liberation brought about the stoppage of the pumps of the Éboulet shaft and the build-up of water in the galleries. In 1945, water pumping began again at the rate of 6,400 m^{3} per month, and coal extraction resumed.

Upon the nationalization of French coal mines in 1946, under the provisional post-war government, initially led by Charles de Gaulle, Ronchamp Mining District was placed under the authority of Électricité de France (EDF), because it was too distant from the other large mining districts of France, and it included a major thermal power plant.

After 1950, the Notre-Dame mine shaft, which could still contain large masses of coal, was again discussed along with a neighboring site, the Tonnet mine shaft, whose coal reserves had already been judged to be exploitable. But the old constructions had to be cleaned up and drained of water, and new infrastructure had to be constructed. The cost of this project (undertaken by the mine's supporting committee) was estimated at a billion francs.

But EDF did not wish to invest further in Ronchamp coal mines, and was preparing to abandon the mining district. The Notre-Dame shaft closed permanently in 1958 and was filled in with schist between June 16 and July 17, 1958. The Saint-Georges and Tonnet shafts were filled in at the same time.

== Conversion ==
On September 28, 1981, at the instigation of the municipality of Ronchamp, a monument created by Bernard Poivey was erected and inaugurated on the foundation of the extraction shaft 29. The site was decorated with potted flowers, gravel, and a grass lawn of grass, and is maintained annually by the commune of Champagney.

In March 2006, Bernard Poivey removed his monument, which had deteriorated, and decided to make changes to it. The slag heap was removed in the following years. The two concrete slabs are still being maintained in the 2010s.

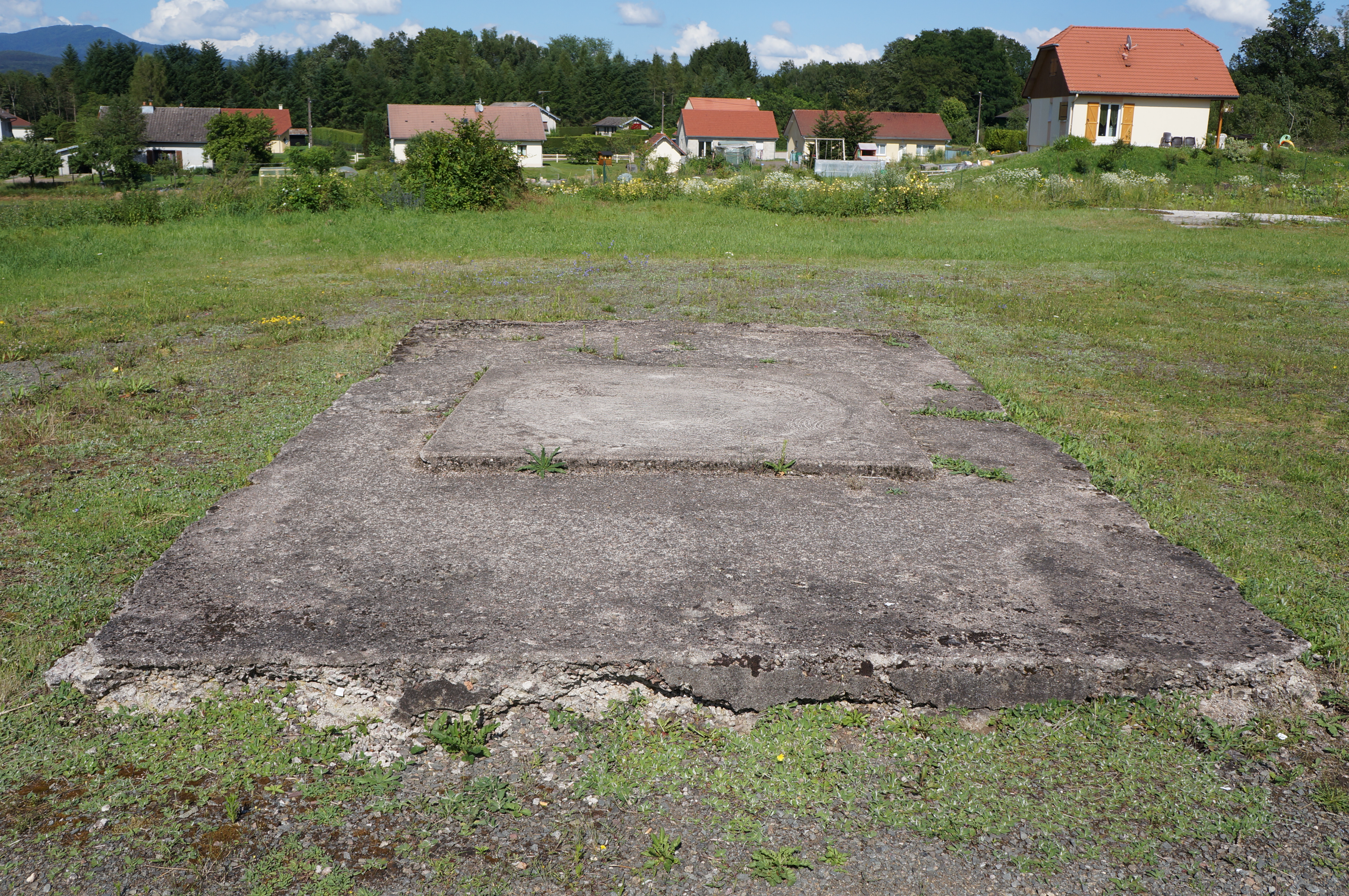

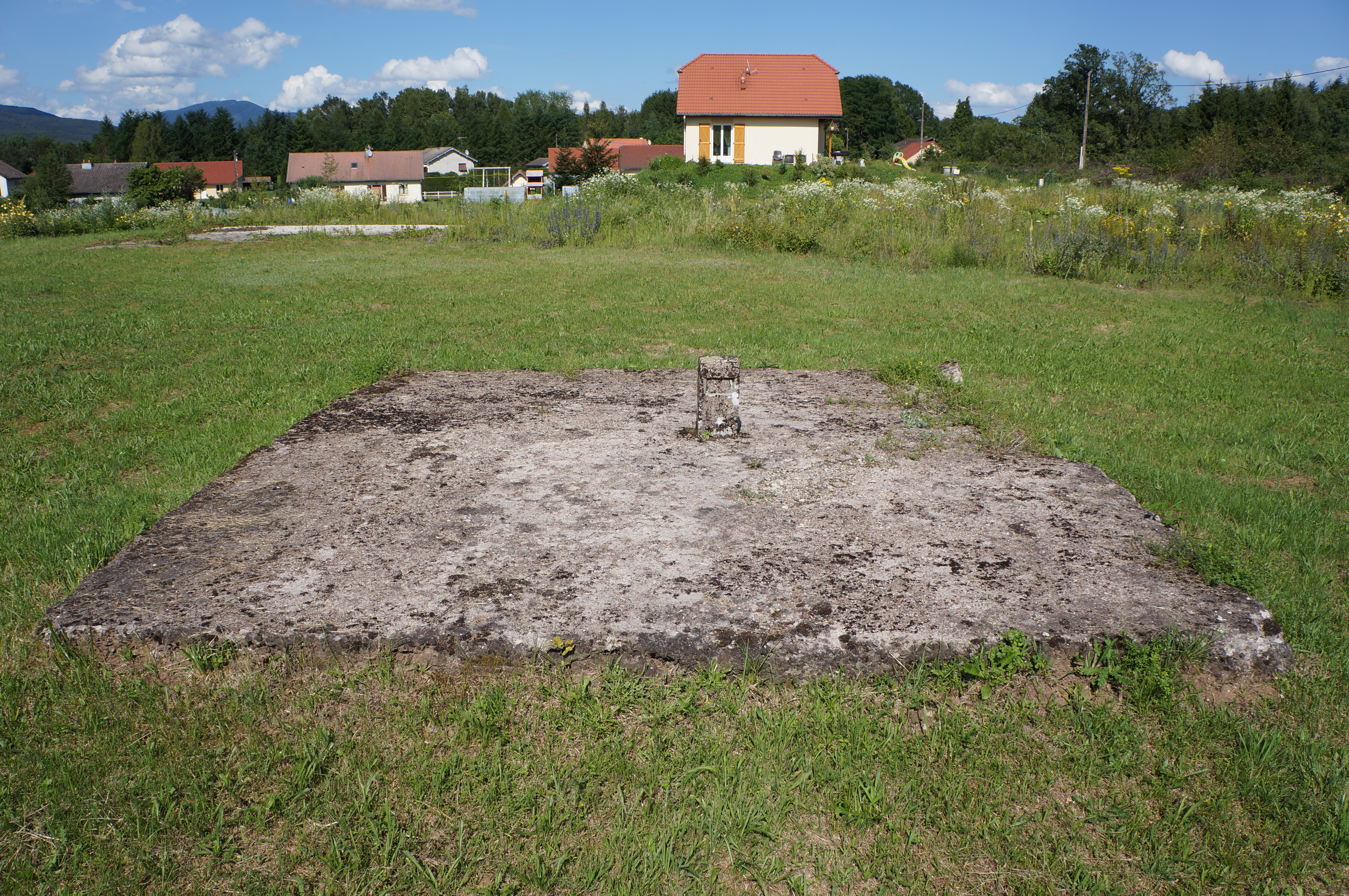

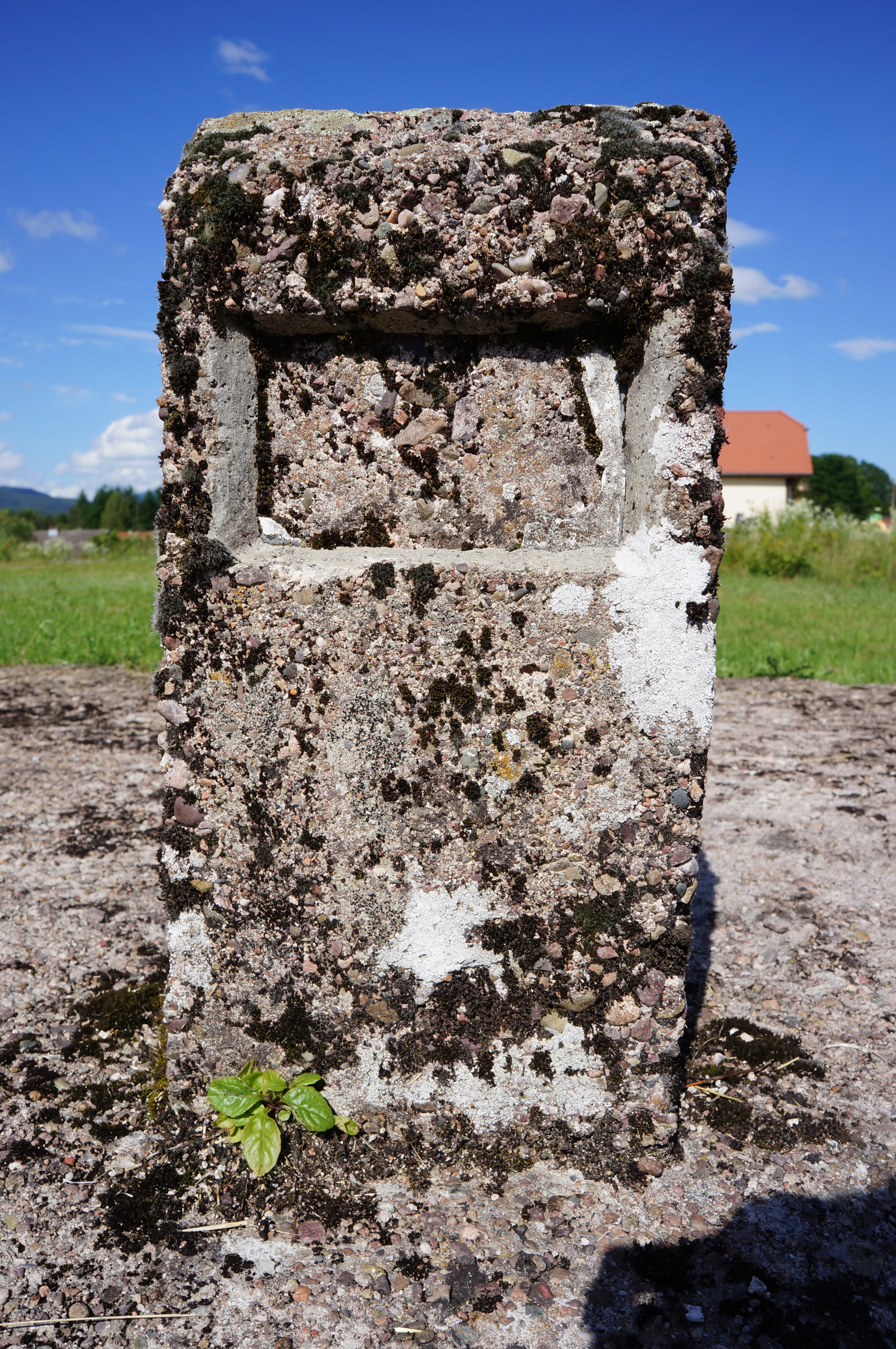

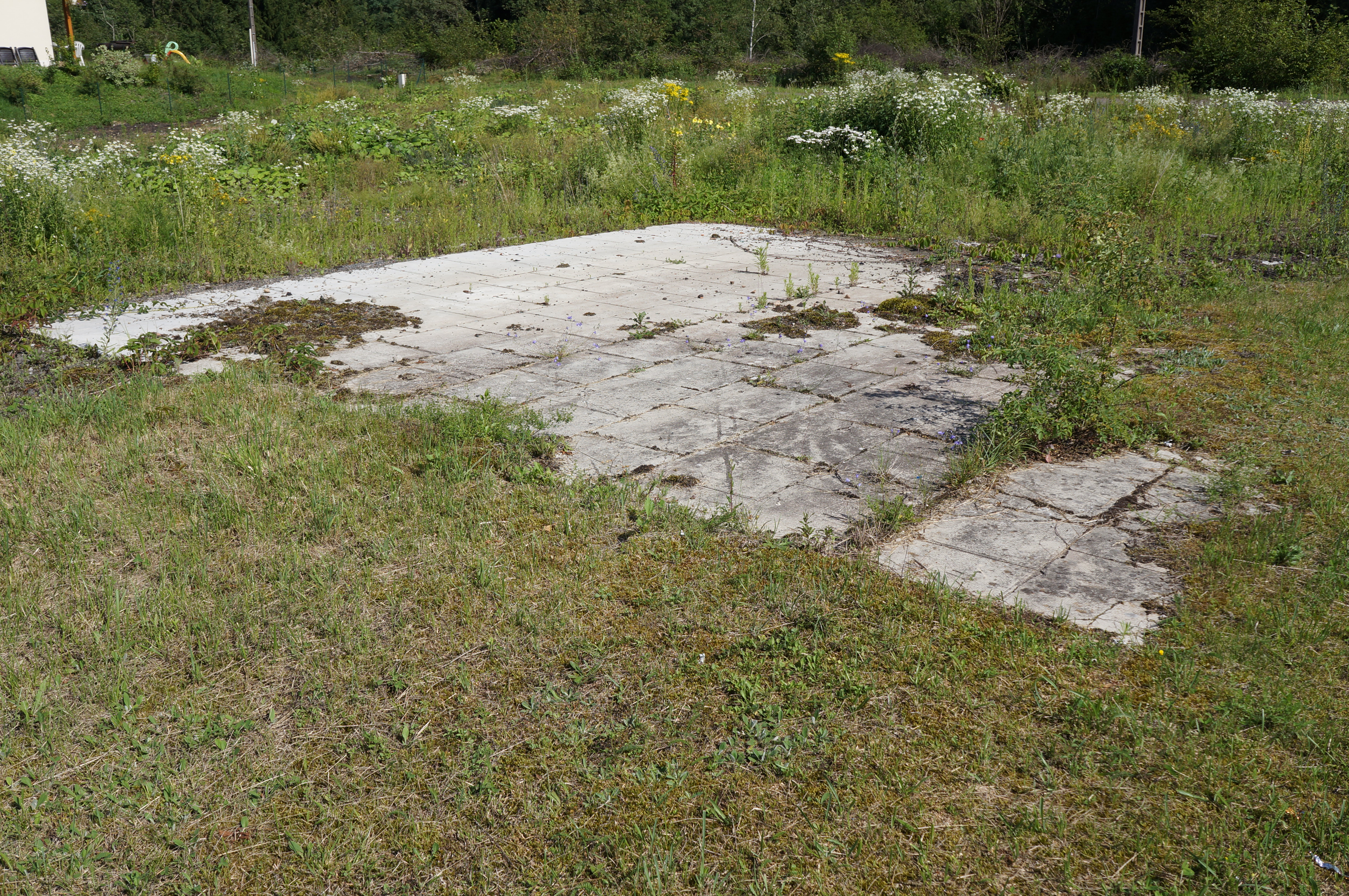

== Slag heap ==
The mine shaft of Notre-Dame had a flat slag heap 47.4128°N 6.3854°E, which, being dumped wheelbarrow by wheelbarrow, assumed the shape of a fan. This slag heap was exploited from 2006 to 2010.

View from the former slag heap, removed from 2006 to 2010.

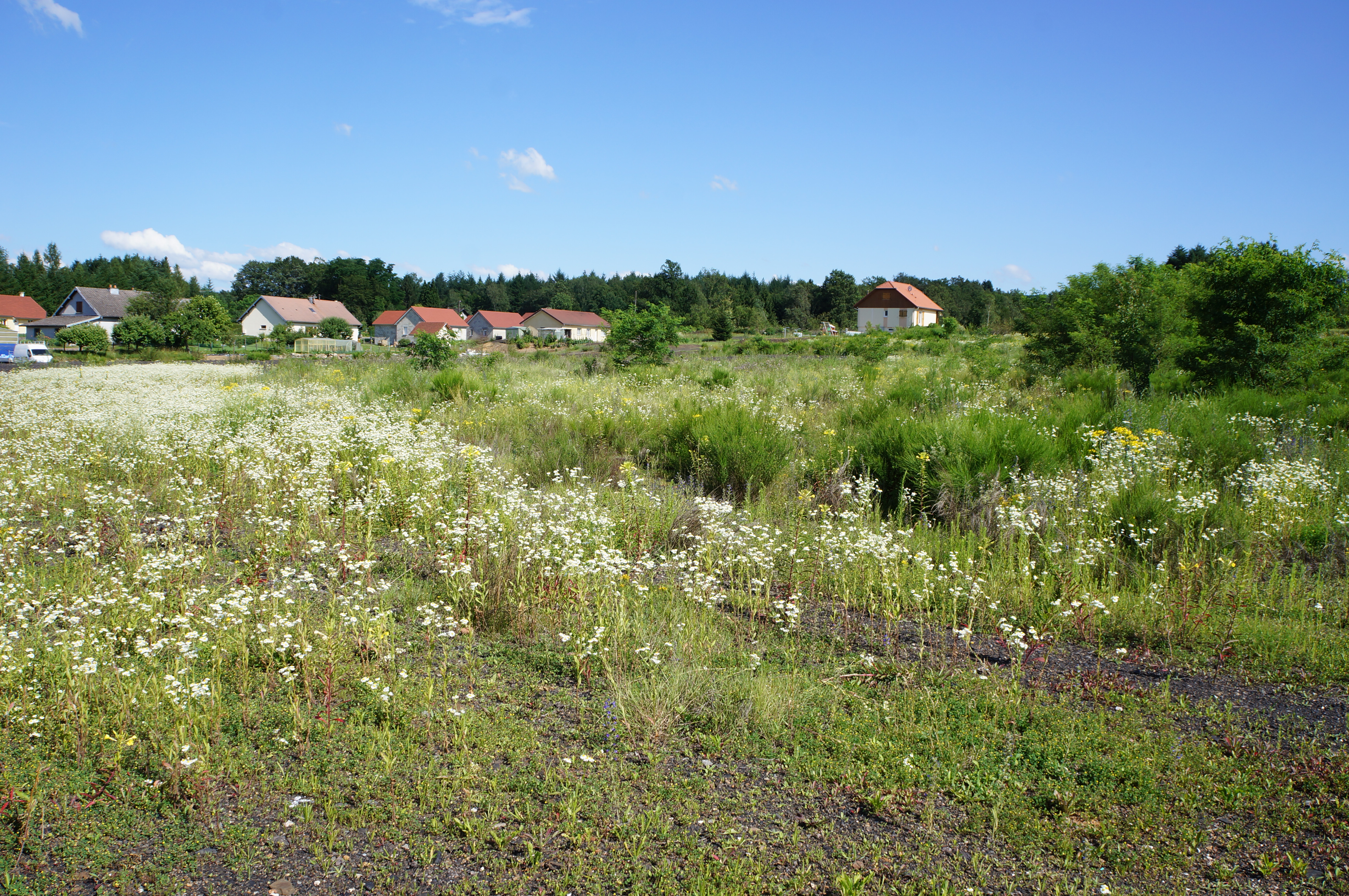
Former site of the slag heap, removed from 2006 to 2010.

== Worker housing and community ==
The Notre-Dame mine shaft is situated in the hamlet of Éboulet, fairly distant from the center of Ronchamp, where there were only a dozen houses in the mid-19th century. A building which had housed machinery was fitted out into a dormitory for mine workers. In 1930, a large building, dubbed the "Château of Éboulet", was constructed. It consisted of two stories containing a total of eight dwellings. Three miner towns were built in proximity to the Notre-Dame mine shaft.

The town of Morbier, constructed in 1927 by the Mine Company of Ostricourt (Compagnie des mines d'Ostricourt) in order to house the mostly Polish workforce, was composed of 24 duplexes. Ten of these were single-story dwellings, and the rest had two. They were built in the same fashion as the houses in the Éboulet town. The ironwork on the façades of the houses represented an interlaced M and O, the logo of the Mines of Ostricourt Company.

The Éboulet camp, constructed in 1931, consisted of 25 duplexes. Constructed of coated cinder blocks, fifteen of these houses had two stories, while the others had only a ground floor with a hip roof. The apartments consisted of three to five rooms. The houses were almost entirely inhabited by Polish families.

The supervisors' camp was constructed at the same time as the Éboulet camp. The three houses consisted of an extra room and a furnished entrance, unlike the miners' houses.

The Éboulet and Morbier camps were registered on 11 March 2010 with the General Inventory of Cultural Heritage

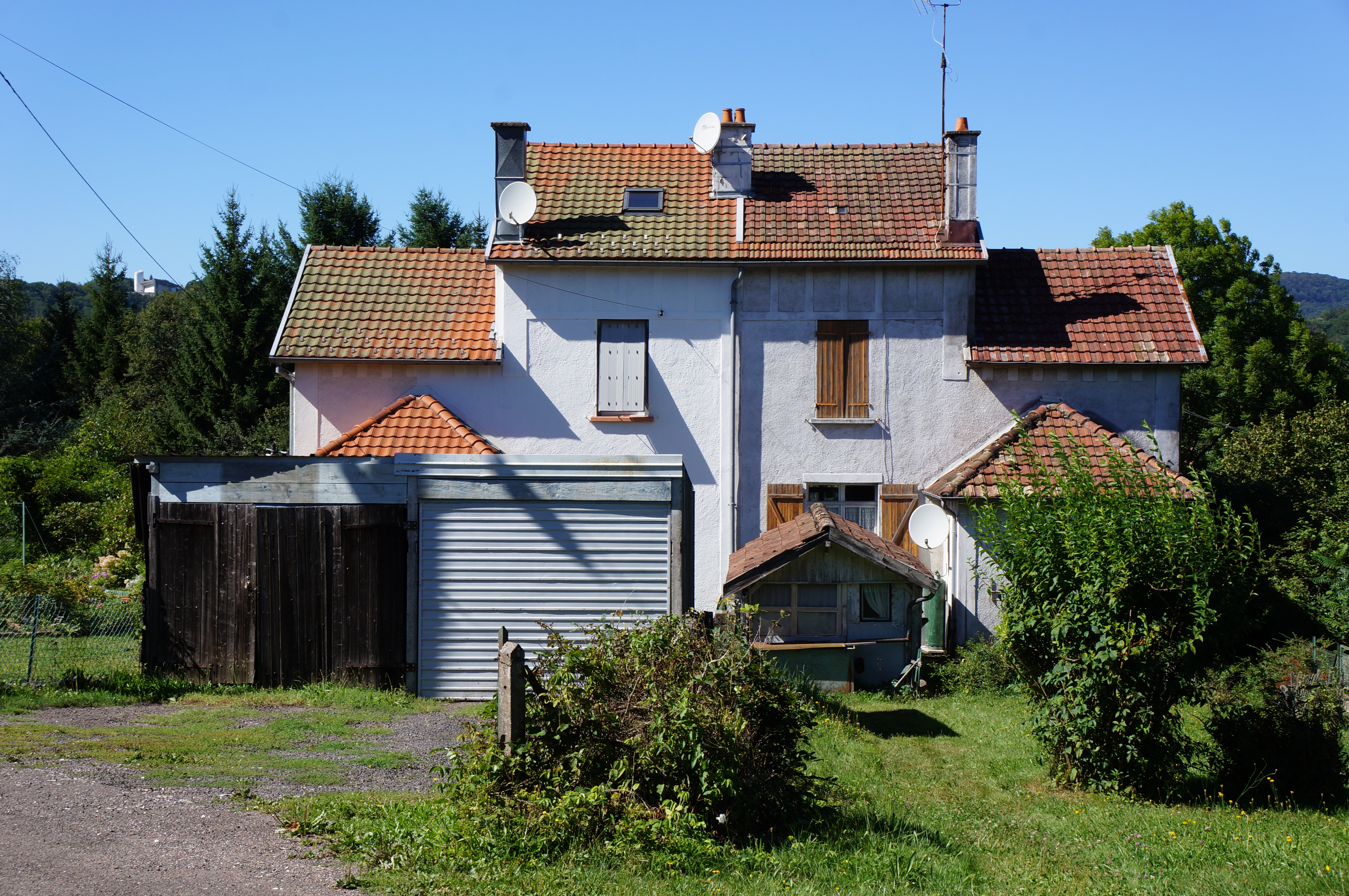
The supervisors' community

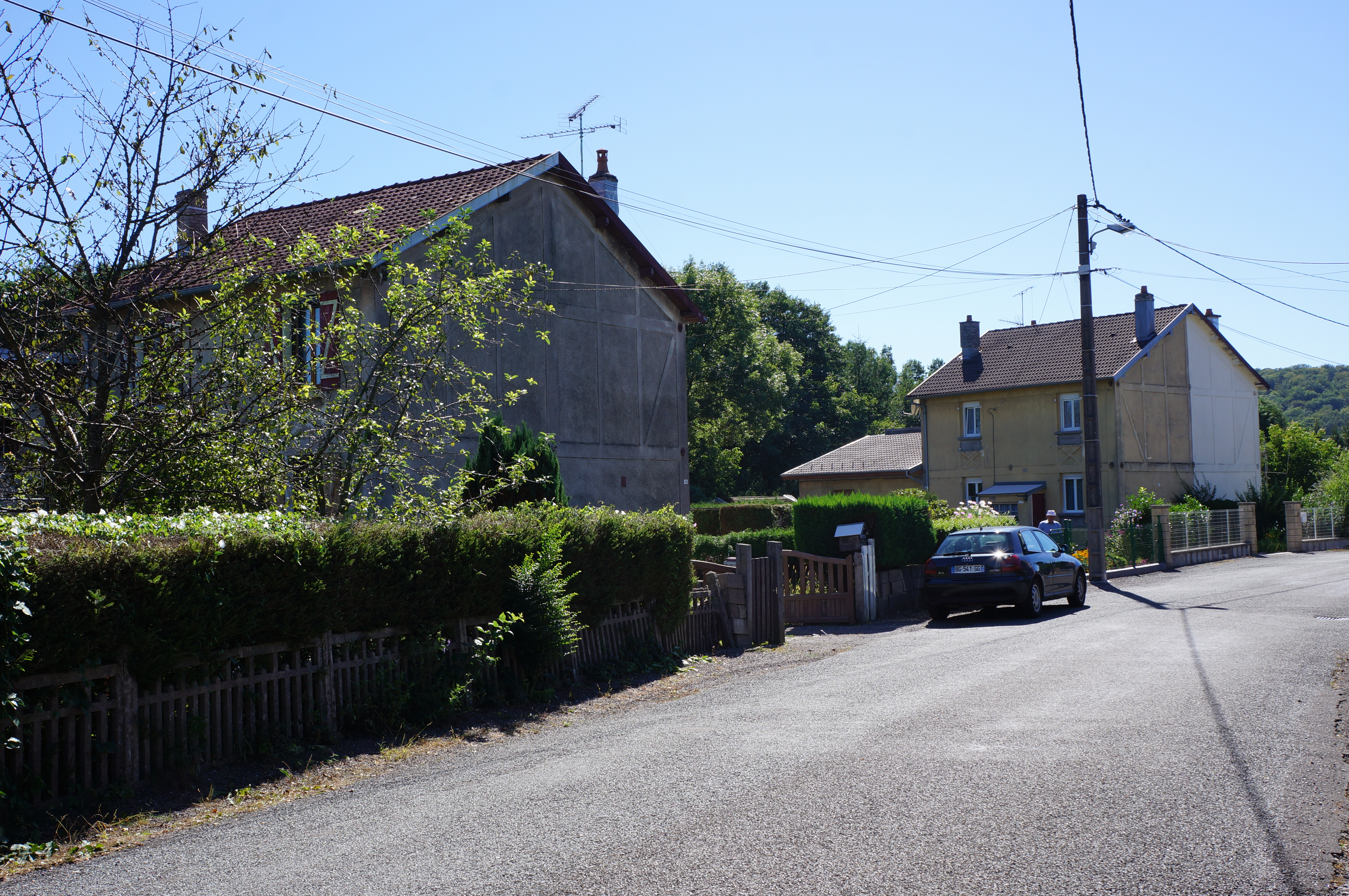
The miners' community of Morbier

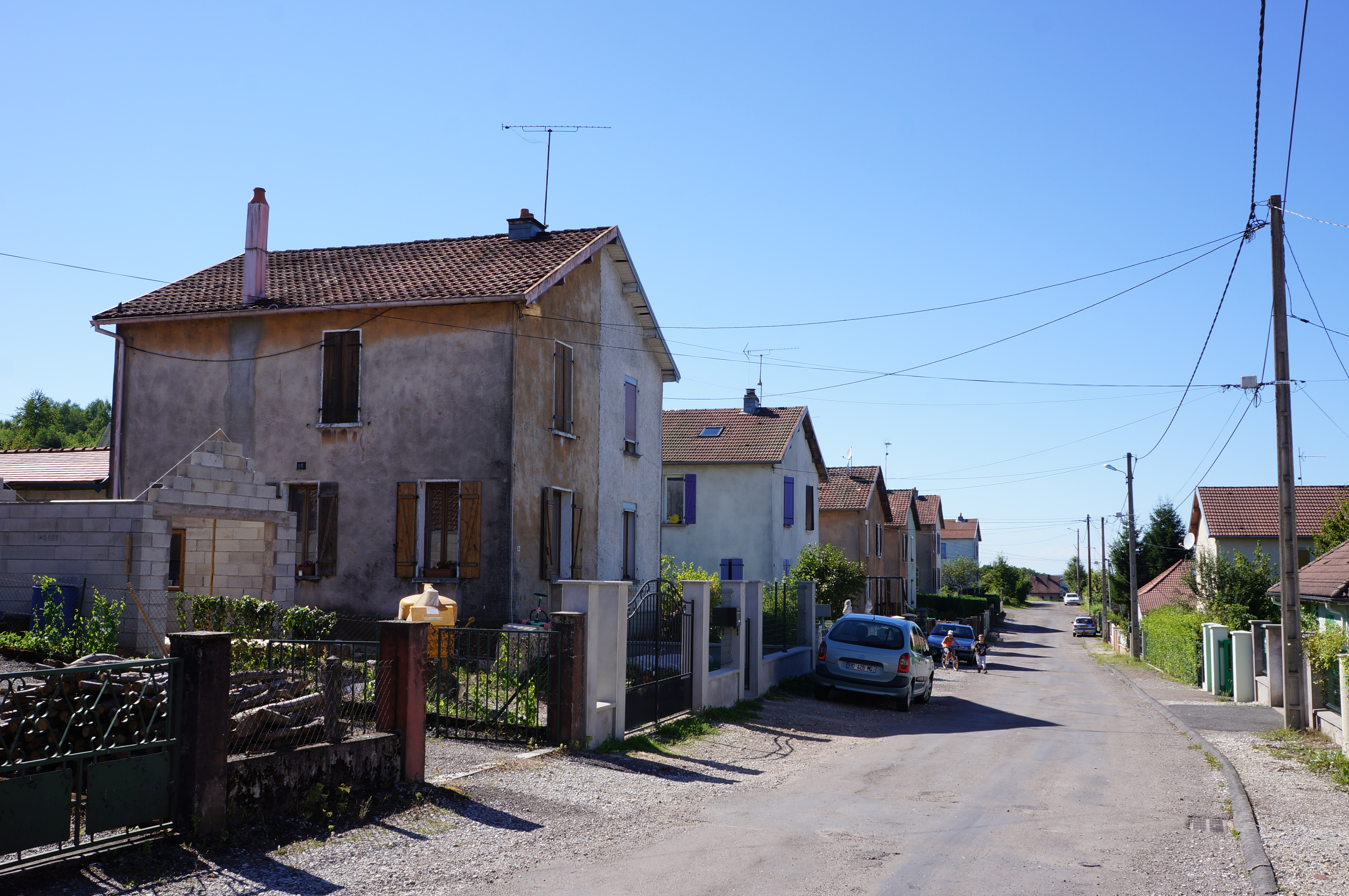
The miners' community of Éboulet

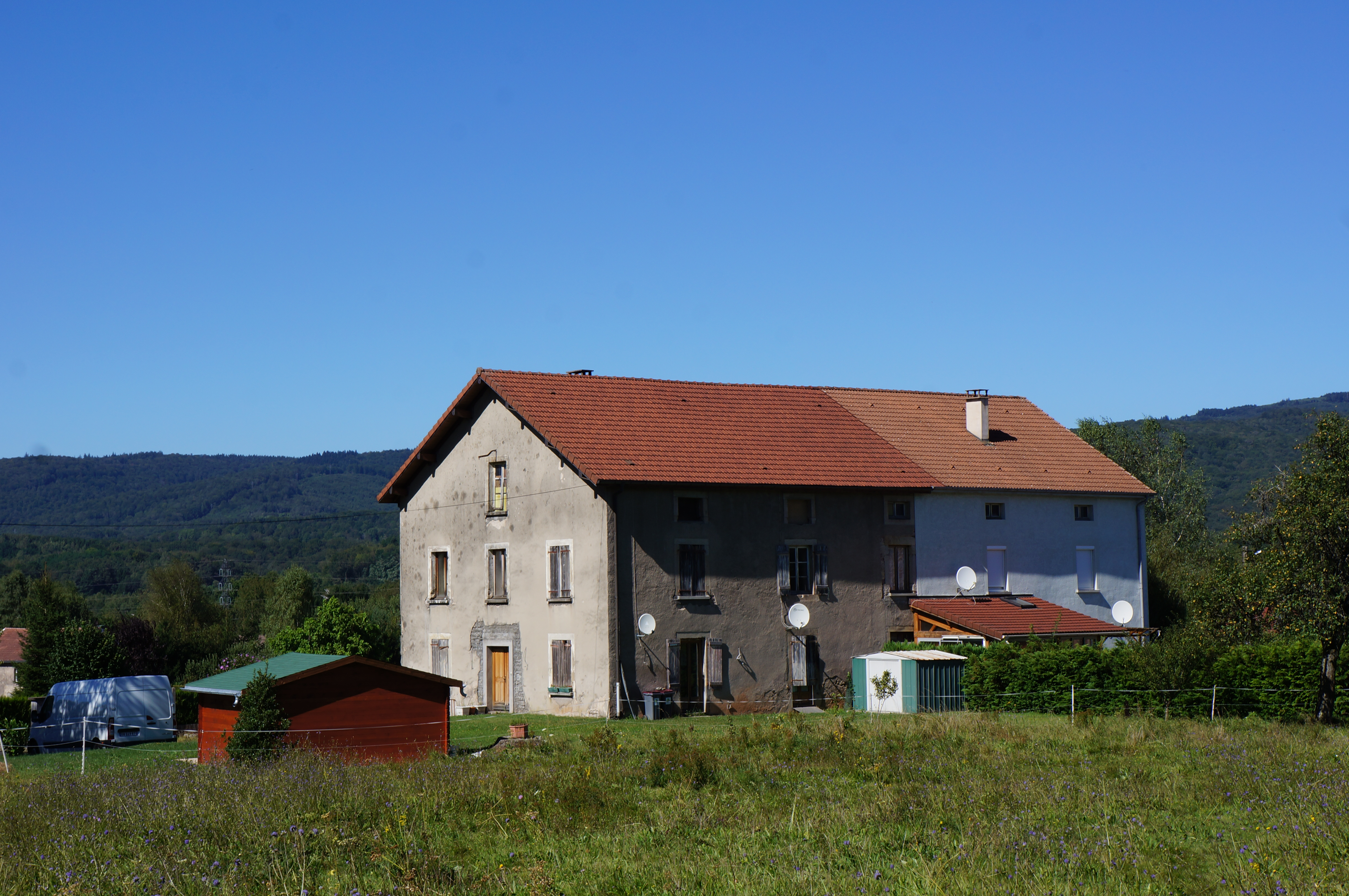
The "château of Éboulet".

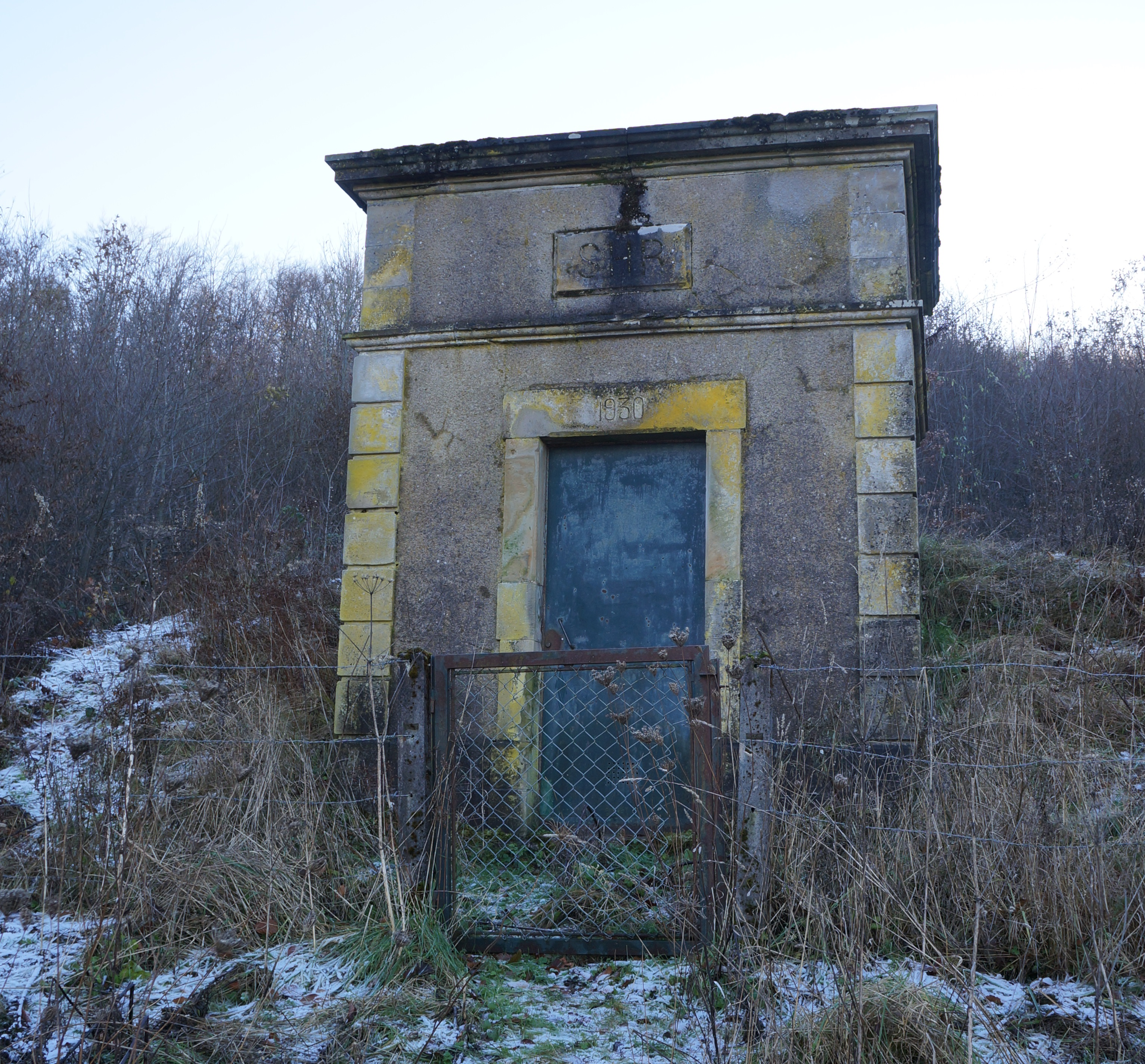
Water tower constructed by the company in 1930

== See also ==
- Ronchamp coal mines
- Arthur de Buyer Coal Mine
