= Magny shaft =

Coal mine shaft in Ronchamp, France

Magny
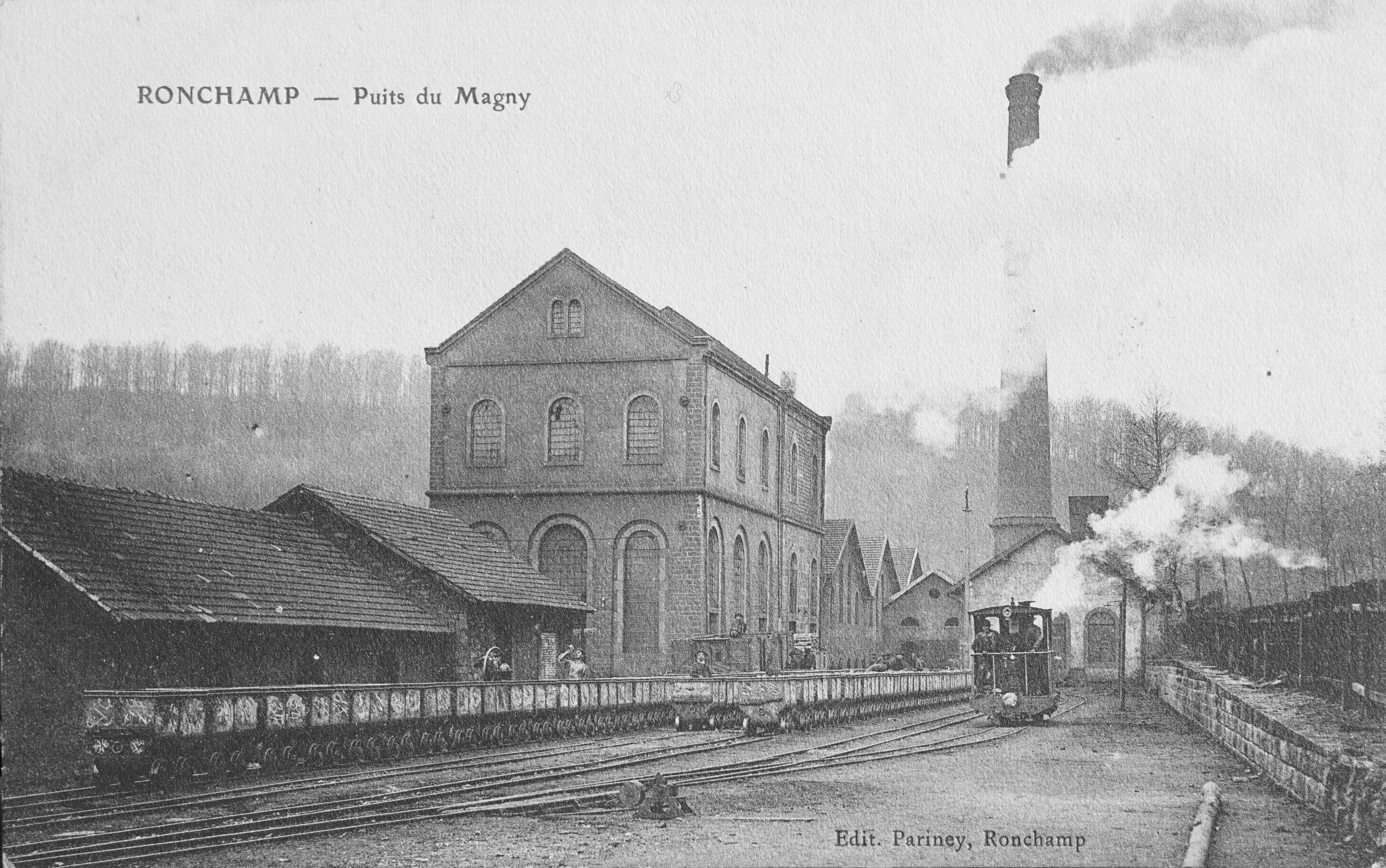
- Industry: Ronchamp coal mines
- Founded: August 5, 1873
- Fate: 1958
- Headquarters: Bourgogne-Franche-Comté, Magny-Danigon, Haute-Saône, France

The Magny shaft is one of the main shafts of the Ronchamp colliery, located in the commune of Magny-Danigon, in the French department of Haute-Saône and the Bourgogne-Franche-Comté region. With a depth of 694 meters, it was the deepest mine shaft in France when it was commissioned in 1878. It is also the Ronchamp shaft with the longest period of operation, at 80 years. This long period of mining was interspersed with several periods of service, the longest lasting more than a decade between the wars. On September 1, 1879, the colliery suffered a firedamp explosion that killed sixteen people. From this shaft, the last coal car in the coalfield was hauled up on Saturday, May 3, 1958.

At the beginning of the 21st century, a few more or less well-preserved buildings remain, including the former administration building and boiler room, which have been converted into housing, as well as the ruins of the extraction building, the changing rooms, and the coal storage building. The pit and mining settlement site has become a hamlet known as “Le Puits du Magny”.

== Situation before sinking ==
Before 1873, the Ronchamp's coal mining company mined the central part of the Ronchamp and Champagney coalfields, but the shafts used for this purpose reached the end of their working life and had to be replaced. This was to be the role of the Magny shaft and the Chanois shaft, the sinking of which began at the same time in the southwestern part of the basin, separated from each other by a distance of 700 meters. The southeast part of the basin has been a disappointment, with the poor results of the Saint-Georges well and the premature abandonment of the Espérance and Saint-Jean wells, which have suffered from heavy water inflows and have therefore become too costly.

== Sinking ==
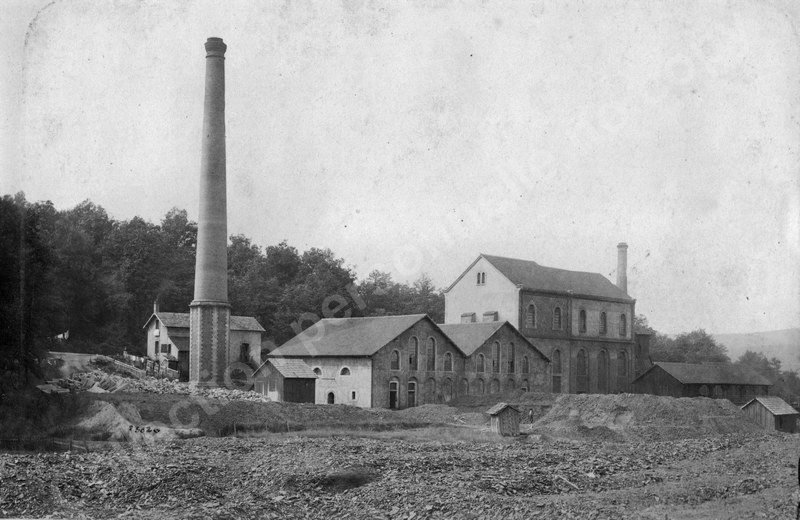
The Magny shaft under construction, with the wooden headframe of the ventilation shaft and a second (temporary) chimney.

Between 1856 and 1859, the Société civile des houillères de Ronchamp drilled the Pré de la Cloche borehole to the north of the future Magny shaft, revealing a layer 1.20 meters thick at a depth of 650 meters. At the same time, the competing company of the maîtres de forges was digging the puits de l'Ouest a few meters away, but this was abandoned after three meters. At the same time, the two companies were vying for the Éboulet concession, which was finally awarded to the Société des Maîtres de Forges in 1862. The two companies eventually merged in 1866.

Sinking of the main shaft, circular in shape and bricked up, began south of the previous exploratory work in 1873. A 25-meter casing is sufficient to cross the aquifer zone, unlike the Chanois shaft, which is subject to heavy water inflows and is behind schedule. A second, smaller well was dug nearby, to serve as a relief and ventilation shaft. By June of the same year, the 3.50-meter-diameter main shaft had reached a depth of 180 meters, and the 2.20-meter-diameter relief shaft had reached a depth of 25 meters.

On May 9, 1877, the shaft encountered a 1.20-meter-thick layer at a depth of 663 meters, along with two small benches of coal twenty and thirty centimeters thick. Five meters further down, another fifty-centimeter-thick coal bed was discovered: the intermediate layer. On October 20, 1877, the shaft reached the hard rock layer of the transitional terrain, without having encountered the second layer of coal, which was considered a bad sign by the engineers.

In 1878, the sinking of the large shaft was completed. It reached a depth of 694 meters, while the small shaft reached 651 meters.

== Surface installations ==
The well facilities in 1949. The remaining buildings and walls are shown in orange, and the missing parts are in brown. (Note: after Jean-Jacques Parietti 1999, p. 43, drawing based on archive plans, miners' accounts, and aerial photos published on Géoportail.)

Numerous brick and stone buildings house the machines and various departments on the surface. The headframe is of the hangar type, i.e. made of wood and housed in a large masonry building. The extraction machine used for sinking the shaft comes from the Saint-Georges shaft and is therefore unsuitable for extracting 250 tonnes of coal in a ten-hour day. It was replaced by a more powerful machine requiring four boilers to turn it, two boilers for the fan, and a relay boiler.

Compressed air for the Magny and Chanois wells is produced by two Burckardt compressors and an older Sommeiller compressor. By 1897, however, these had to be replaced by new 5 m^{3} compressors powered by a 150-horsepower steam engine.

1A. extraction shaft

1B. ventilation and emergency shafts;
2. hanging room, showers;
3. timber yard;
4. boilers and large chimney;
5. compressor and fan room;
6. lamp room;
7. extraction machine;
8. administration building;
9. coal storage building;
10. mining town;
11. former Polish miners' canteen;
12. catechism room for Polish children;

13. slag heap

== Operation ==
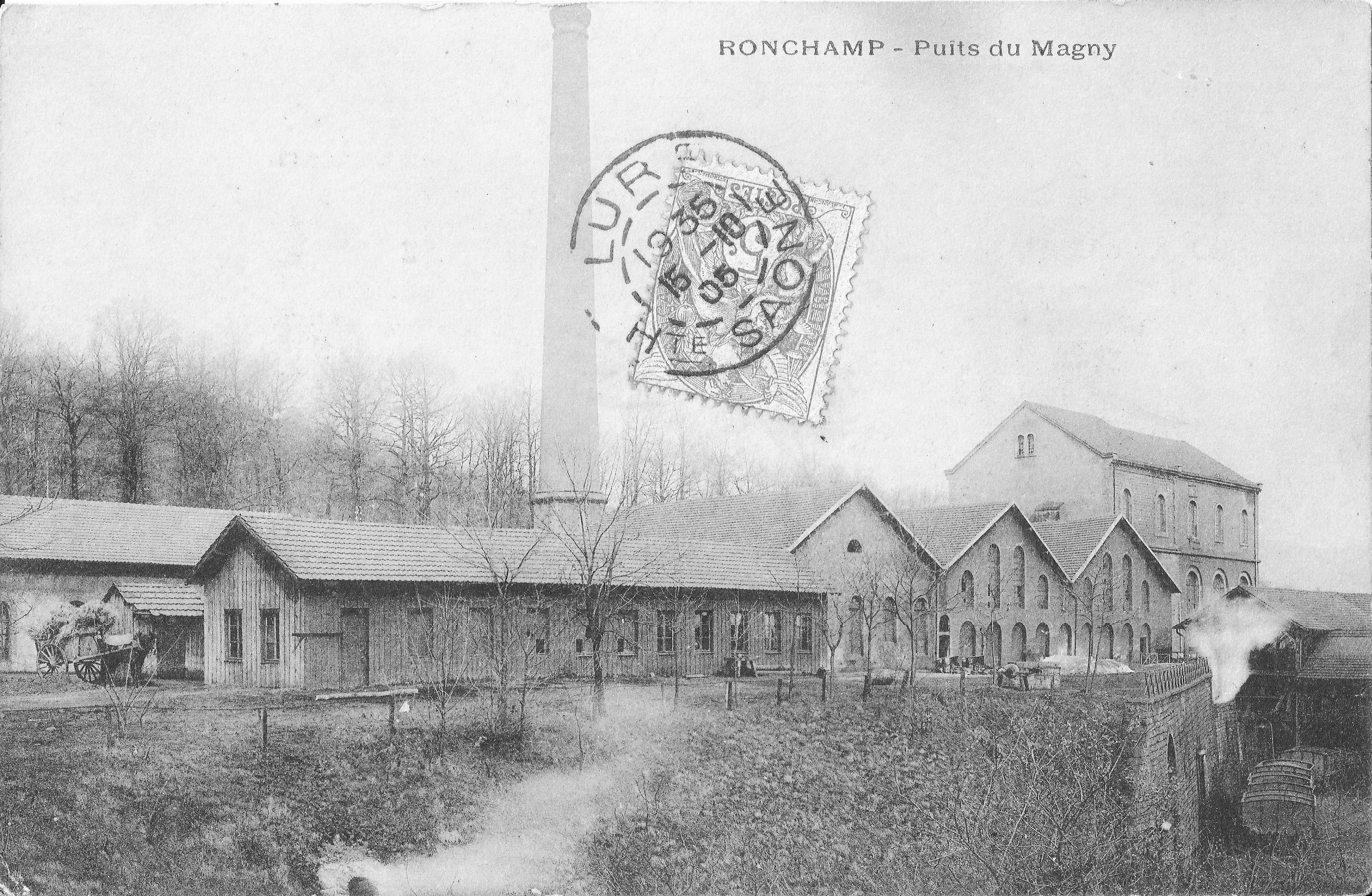
The former engine rooms and boilers were converted into changing rooms and showers in the 1920s. (Note: The industrial building furthest to the right is also the tallest. It housed the headframe.)

When it was commissioned in 1878, the Magny shaft was considered a failure due to poor sinking results, but when the first extraction work was carried out, discoveries of good-quality layers over a meter thick finally ensured the shaft's future. From 1878 to 1916, the Magny shaft operated at full capacity; in 1880, it was the most productive shaft in the entire basin. It thus played a part in the golden age of Ronchamp's coal mines before the 1920s.

=== Disaster of 1879 ===
On September 1, 1879, at 4:30 a.m., while working northwards, the first firedamp explosion at the Magny shaft killed sixteen people (fifteen instantly) and injured two others, just one month after the colliery was commissioned. Twelve bodies were brought up the same day, and the funeral took place the following morning at the Ronchamp church. Three more bodies were found after a search, and the sixteenth miner died in hospital from his injuries. Henri Poincaré, a civil mining engineer, was put in charge of the investigation.

He concludes that the accident was caused by the miner Pautot: having accidentally pierced his lamp with his pick, he climbs back up the inclined plane, hooks his lamp to the woodwork, and leaves with Peroz's. But he leaves his damaged lamp near a gas release, triggering an explosion. But he left his damaged lamp close to a gas release, triggering the explosion. Following this accident, the old Davy lamps were replaced by safer Mueseler lamps. In addition, a more powerful fan was installed the following year, to improve ventilation efficiency. This was a variable-effect SER system fan with a flow rate of 30 m3/s, compared with 10 m3/s previously. Finally, the company is blamed for the fact that the workings were ventilated downwards, rather than upwards as recommended. After the disaster, the shaft employed around a hundred workers, who hauled up 70 tonnes of coal every day.

== Extraction ==
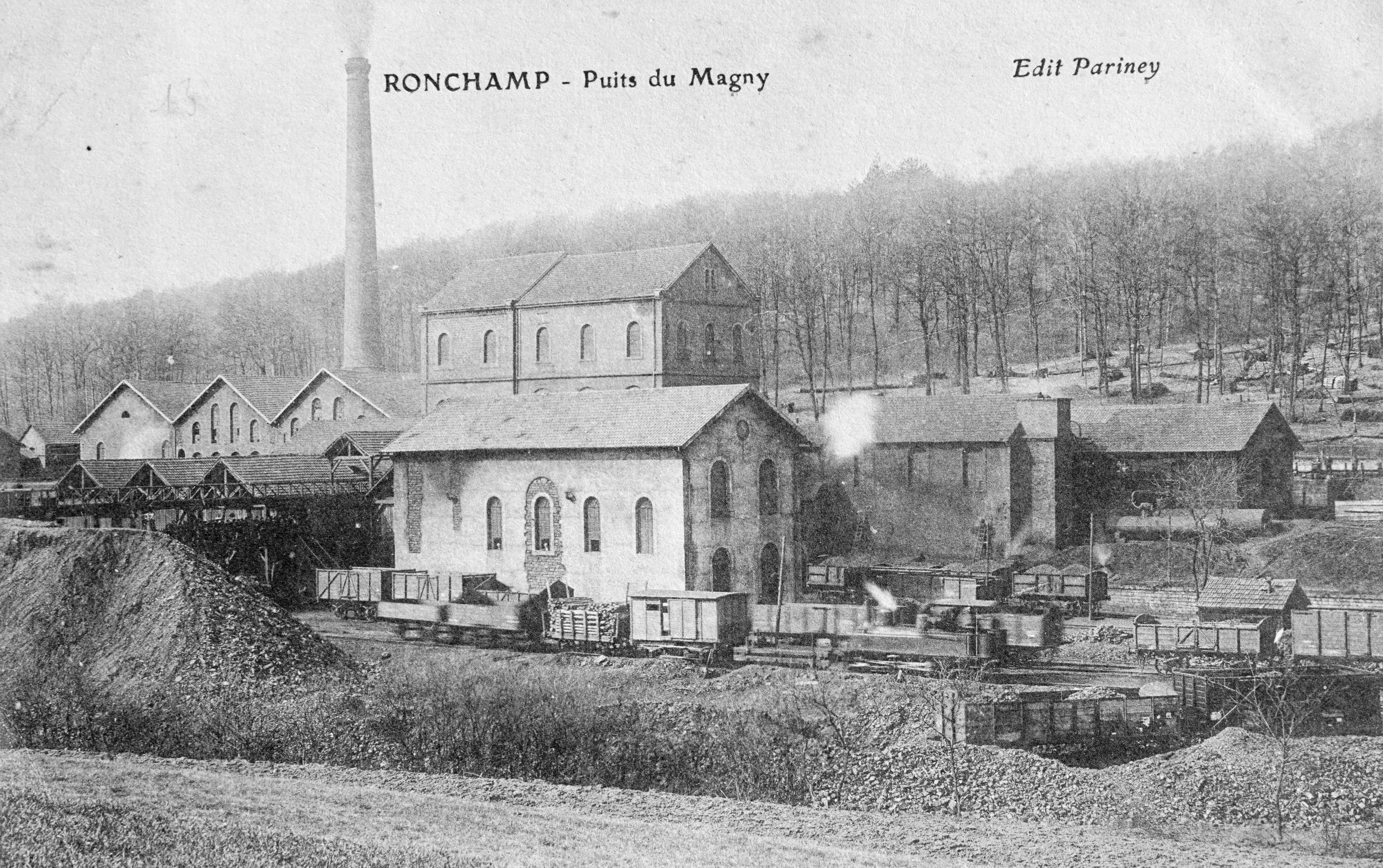
The shaft in full operation, with wagons and locomotives belonging to the coal mining rail network. (Note: The industrial building furthest to the right is also the tallest. It housed the headframe.)

In the same year as the disaster, the Magny shaft took on additional importance compared to the company's other shafts, thanks to the installation of washing and screening workshops, the increase in the number of workers, which necessitated the construction of a coal preparation and washing room, and finally, the encounter, in the work to the east, of the second layer of coal measuring 4.20 meters thick.

A connecting gallery was dug with the Chanois shaft in December 1883. In this way, each shaft could be used as a backup shaft for the other in case of need. In 1888, the ventilation shaft was deepened. A pneumatic machine was used to lift the excavated material up to the first-floor sleeper in the lower part of the shaft.

The Magny well became Ronchamp's most important, with production reaching 42,000 tonnes by 1881. In 1895, production reached an average of 360 tonnes per day with 420 workers. The following year, workers from the Notre-Dame shaft, which had just closed, were assigned to the Magny shaft. In 1897, the mining galleries had a total length of 12 km.

By 1901, both strata were being mined to the north and south, with 26 cuts in operation. In 1908, a trench was dug between the Arthur-de-Buyer shaft and the Magny shaft.

=== Service shafts ===
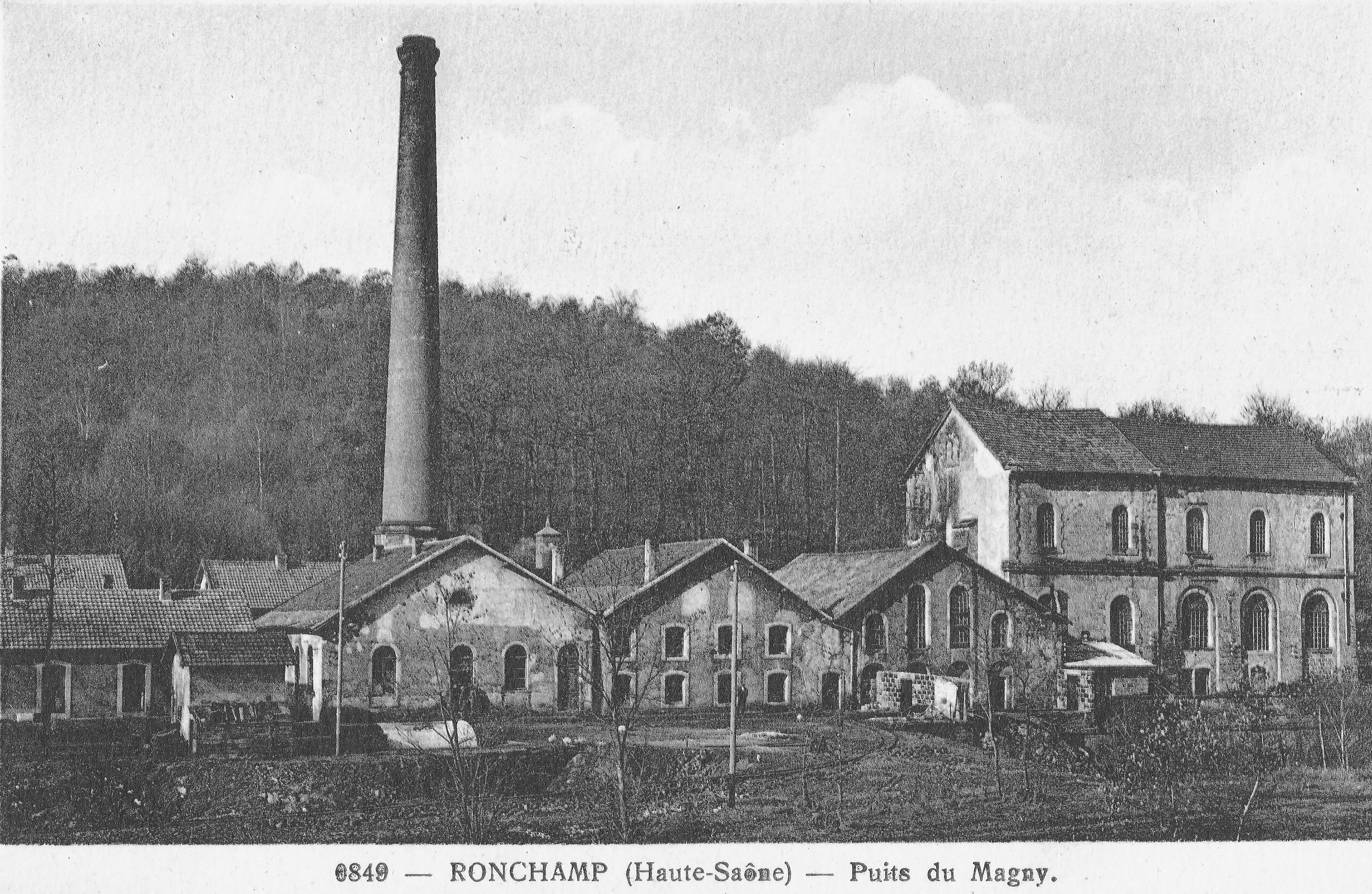
The Magny shaft circa 1920. (Note: The industrial building furthest to the right is also the tallest. It housed the headframe.)

The workings to the north and east (towards the old shafts) soon showed signs of exhaustion, and old mining operations, carried out from other abandoned shafts, were encountered as early as 1907. The Magny shaft remained the most productive, with production still exceeding 80,000 tonnes a year. On August 15, 1912, a fire in the stable of the Arthur-de-Buyer shaft released heavy smoke, which was sucked up by the fan of the Magny shaft, asphyxiating four miners and a horse in its path.

In 1916, the decision was taken to abandon the Magny shaft as an extraction shaft, but it was retained as a service shaft for its two neighbors, the Chanois shaft and the Arthur-de-Buyer shaft. It continues to provide ventilation to the southeast shafts of the Arthur shaft. An airlock is installed at the shaft's mouth to avoid interfering with ventilation. A windlass is used to monitor the shaft column and lower firefighters and limbers to the bottom. The shaft entrance is equipped with an access hatch. For eleven years, the buildings were left untended and slowly deteriorated.

=== Back to extraction ===
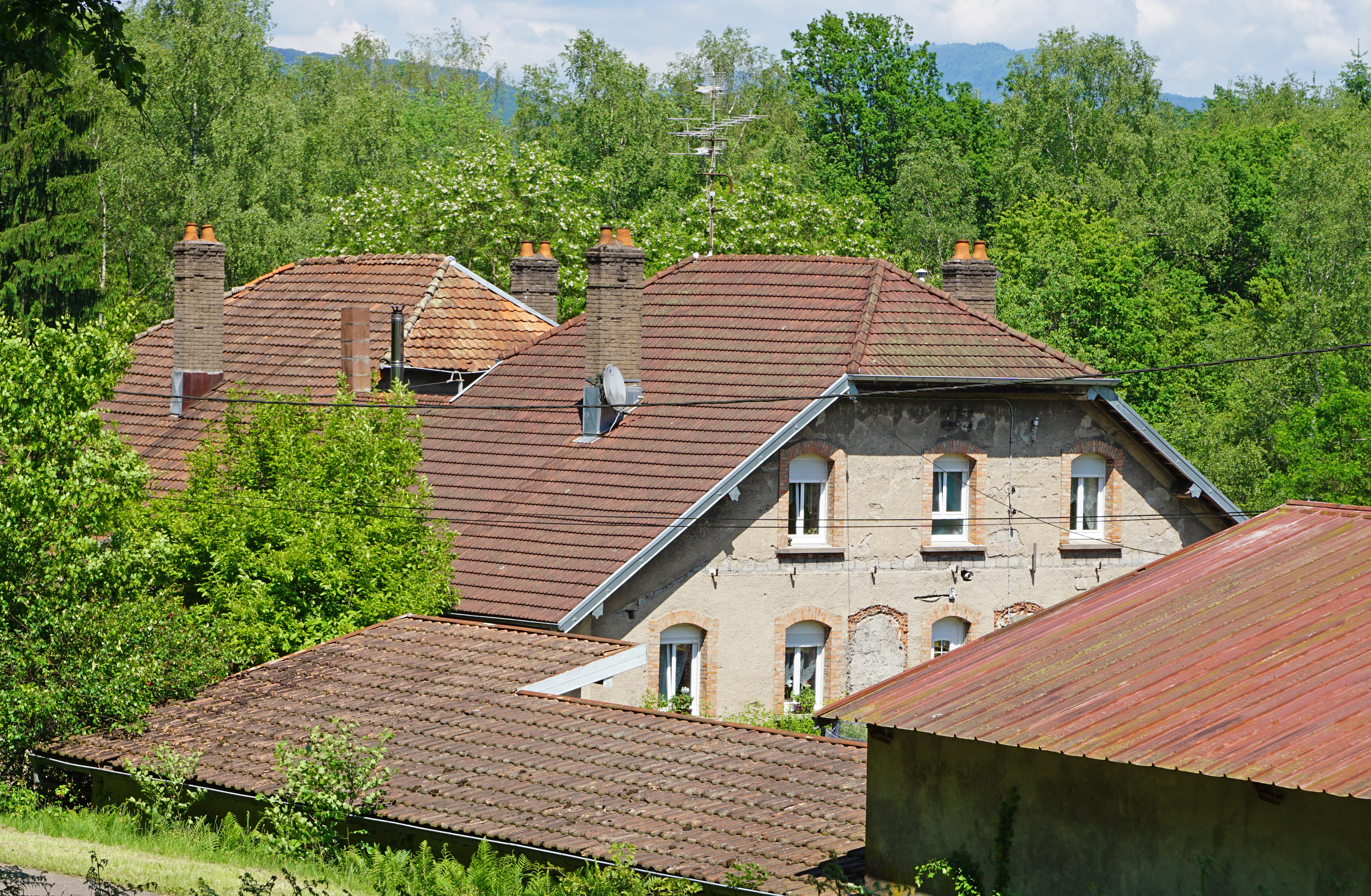
The administration building, built in 1927.

In 1930, mining resumed at the Magny shaft, following major renovation work begun three years earlier. The roofs were refurbished, the buildings modified, the wooden headframe rebuilt and single-story cages installed. A cloakroom-shower-lamproom complex was installed. A new administration building and a timber yard were built. At the same time, bowettes were dug at the bottom of the mine and new workings opened. This return to mining was prompted by the increasing distance of the extraction sites from the two other active shafts. New electric pumps were installed in 1932; two years later, a diesel locotractor replaced the horses for the 3.5 km drive. In 1939, the Canada bowette linking the Arthur-de-Buyer shaft to the Magny shaft was completed, and production from the latter fell to 1,700 tonnes from 2,500 tonnes three years earlier. By 1943, production was declining and no longer profitable; equipment that had broken down could not be repaired for lack of spare parts. The well's reserves were estimated at 288,000 tonnes.

Work continued intermittently until the end of the Ronchamp colliery's life. Work was interrupted in 1940 for more than a month, and again in 1944 to restore the installations after the Liberation. By 1945, the company was planning to shut down the shaft. When the French coal industry was nationalized in 1946, at the instigation of the provisional government led initially by Charles de Gaulle, the Ronchamp coalfield was entrusted to Électricité de France (EDF), as it was too far from other major coalfields and included a major thermal power plant. The following year, the shaft still employed 38 people, including a dozen miners. EDF stopped exploration work in 1950. The following year, the shaft was shut down again, while the Chanois shaft closed for good. To prevent water from the Chanois from invading the Magny, a watertight plug was installed at the entrance to the gallery linking the two shafts, and a 40 cm ring of concrete was poured around the gallery where it opened to withstand the pressure of the water. Mining resumed in 1953 to exploit the Clovis panel (a part of the mine that remained undeveloped). It was from this panel that Ronchamp's last coal sedan was extracted on Saturday, May 3, 1958.

=== Reconversion ===
In 1958, the surface infrastructure was dismantled and the chimney was carefully removed. The buildings were subsequently sold to private owners. The shafts were backfilled and covered with a concrete slab.

At the beginning of the 21st century, the old administrative building dating from 1927, the old boiler building, the ruins of the large extraction building and the overgrown changing rooms, and two pieces of wall from the storage building remain. Few traces remain of this mining operation, which lasted almost 80 years.

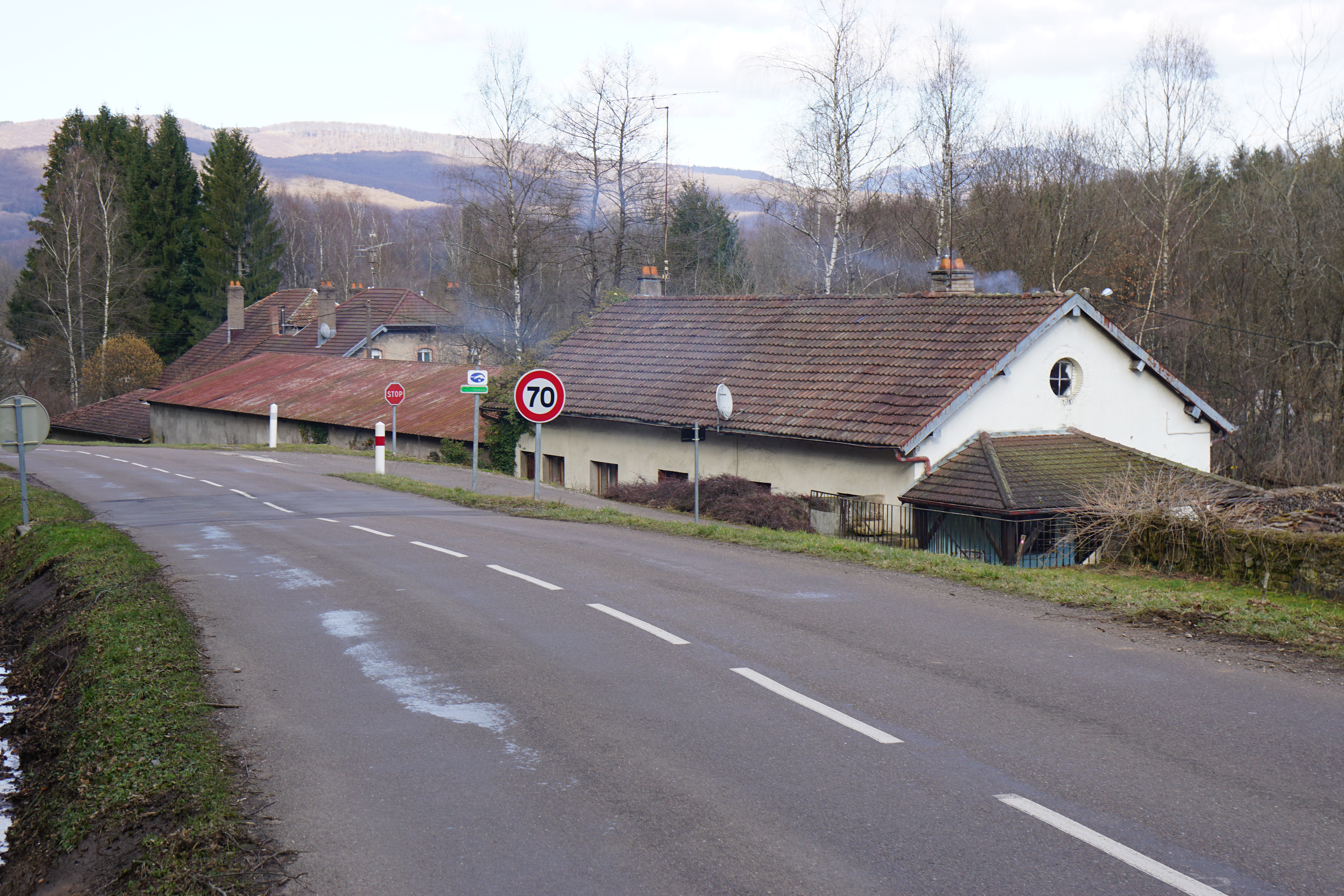
General view of the Magny well from the Ronchamp-Clairegoutte road. In the foreground, is the white-painted boiler house, now converted into housing.

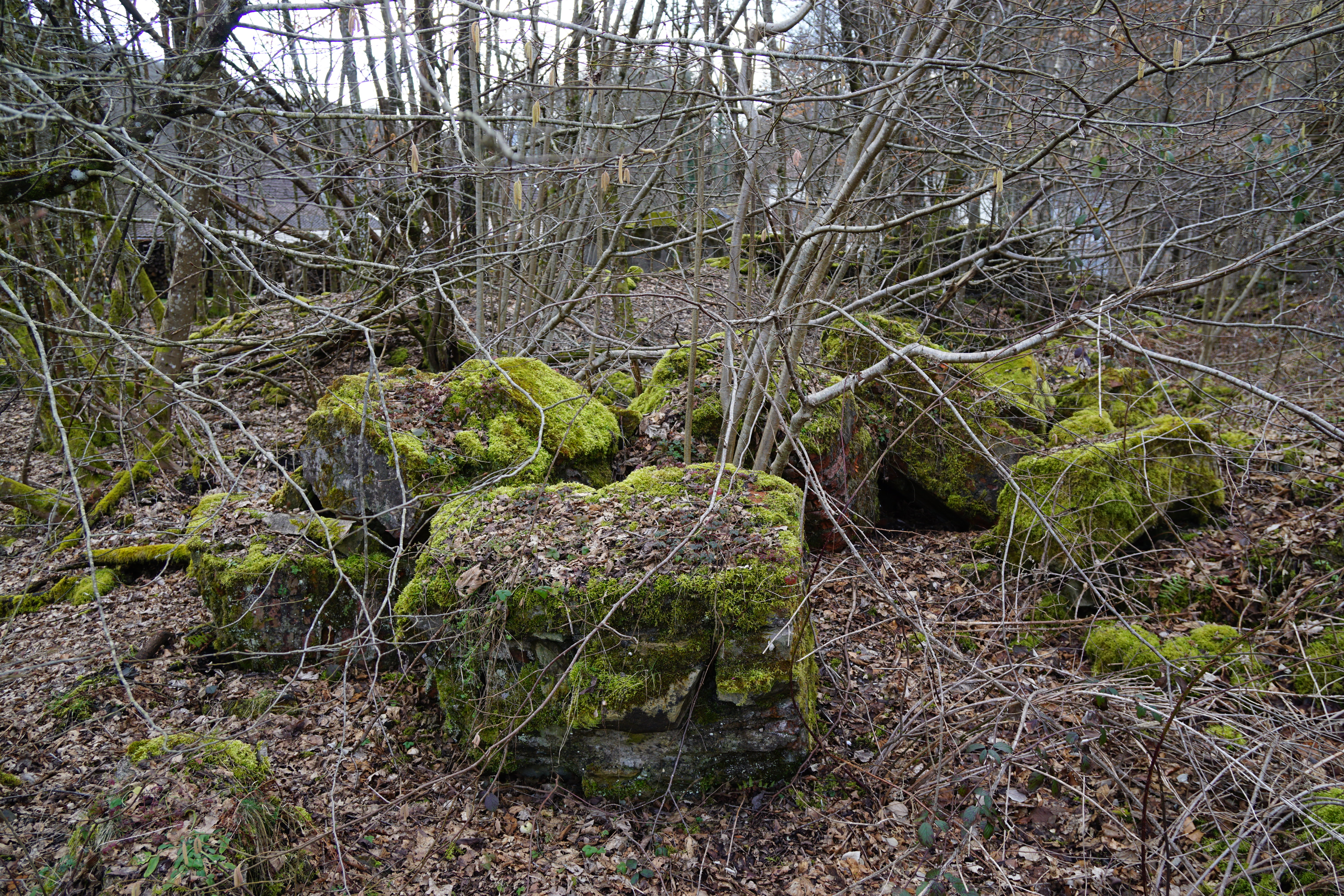
Scattered pieces of wall.

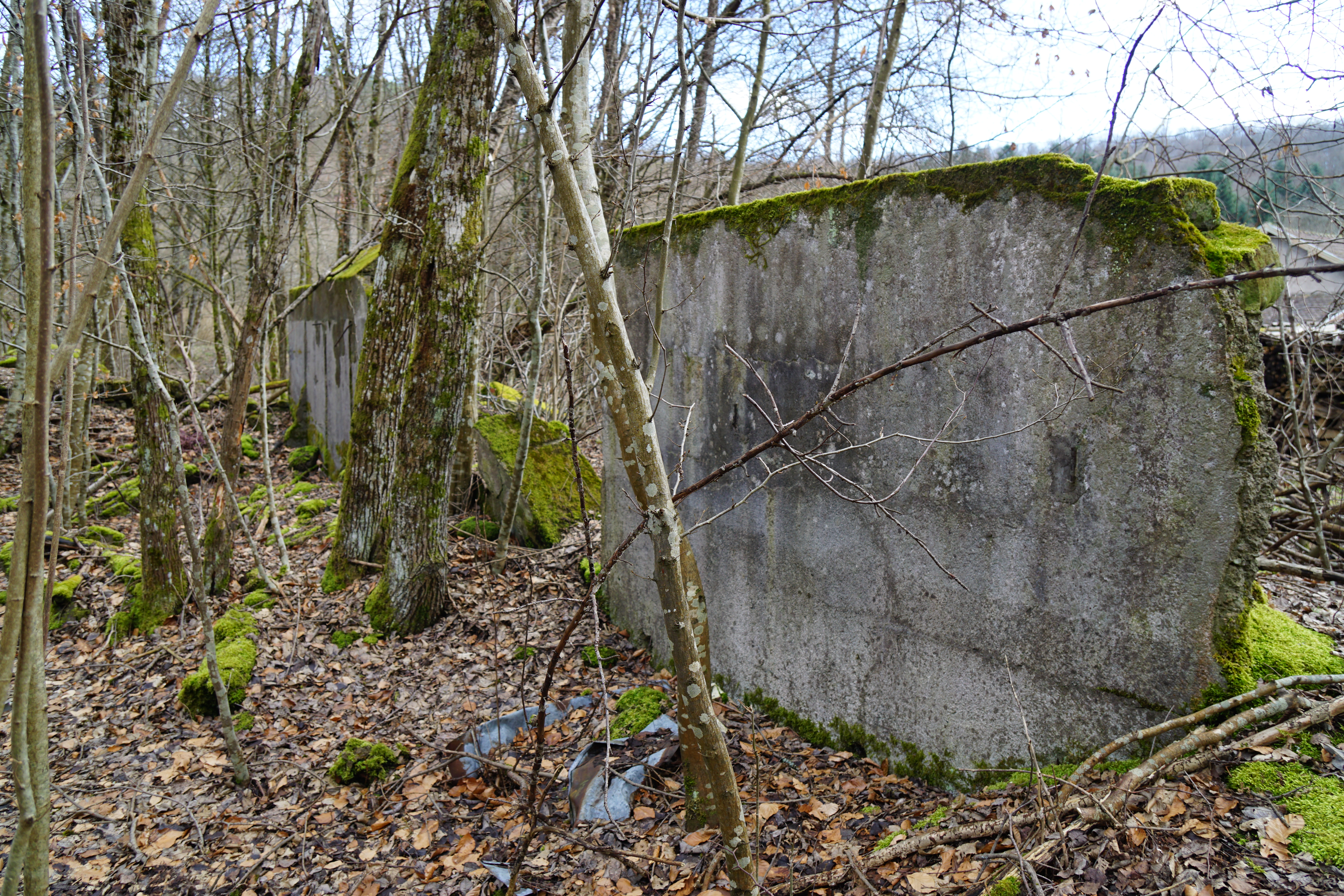
Remains of a wall near the ruins.

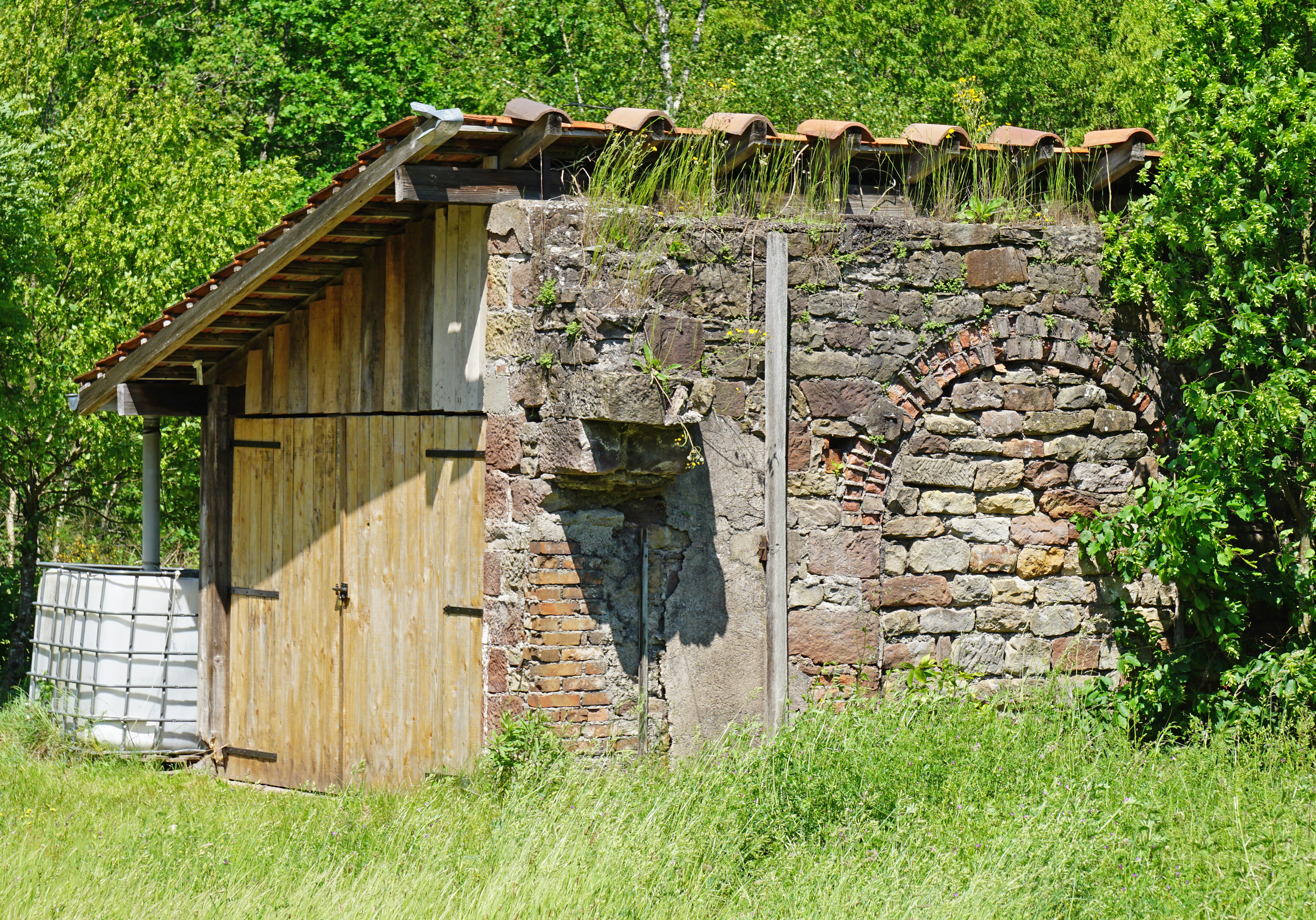
Ruins of the extraction building:

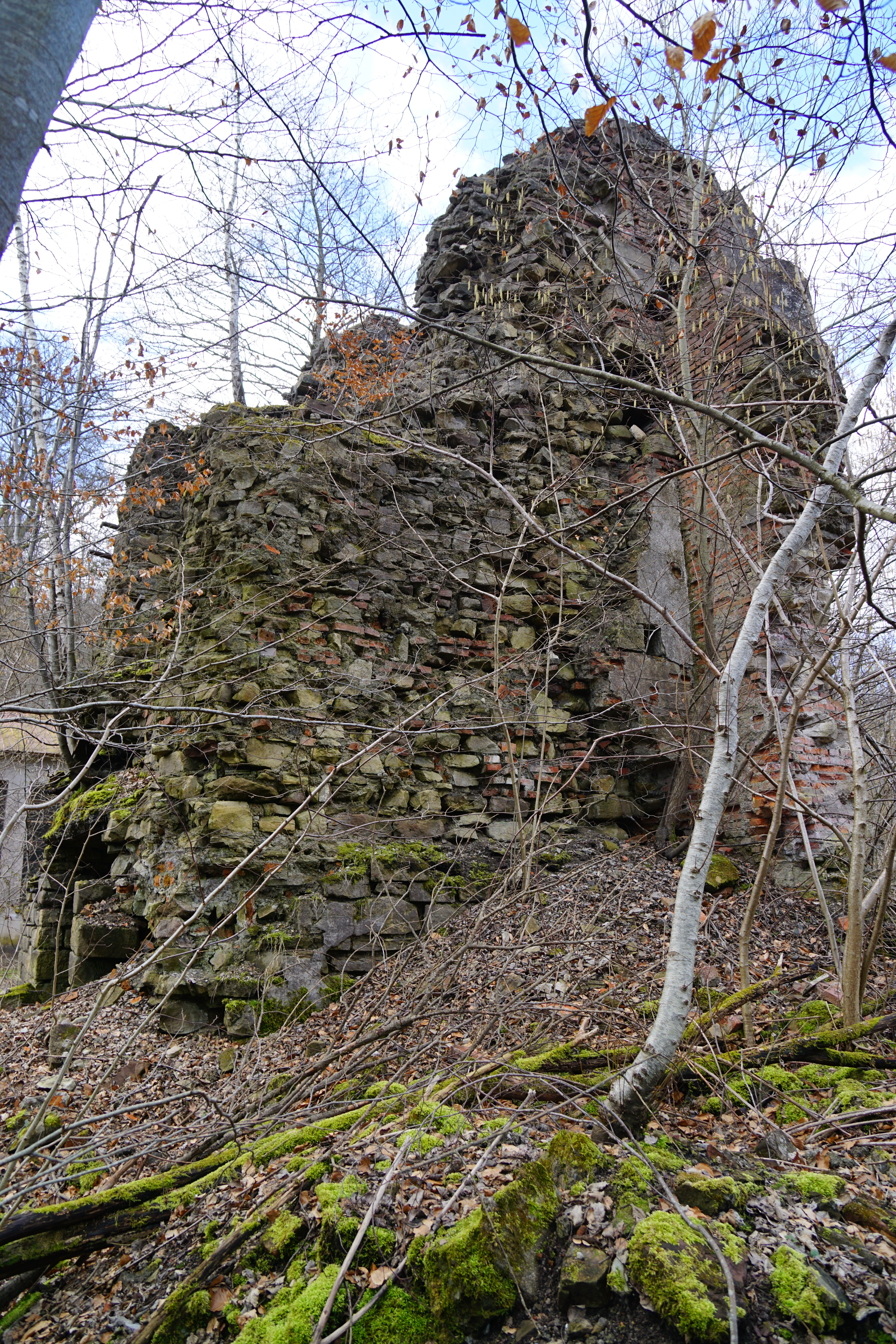

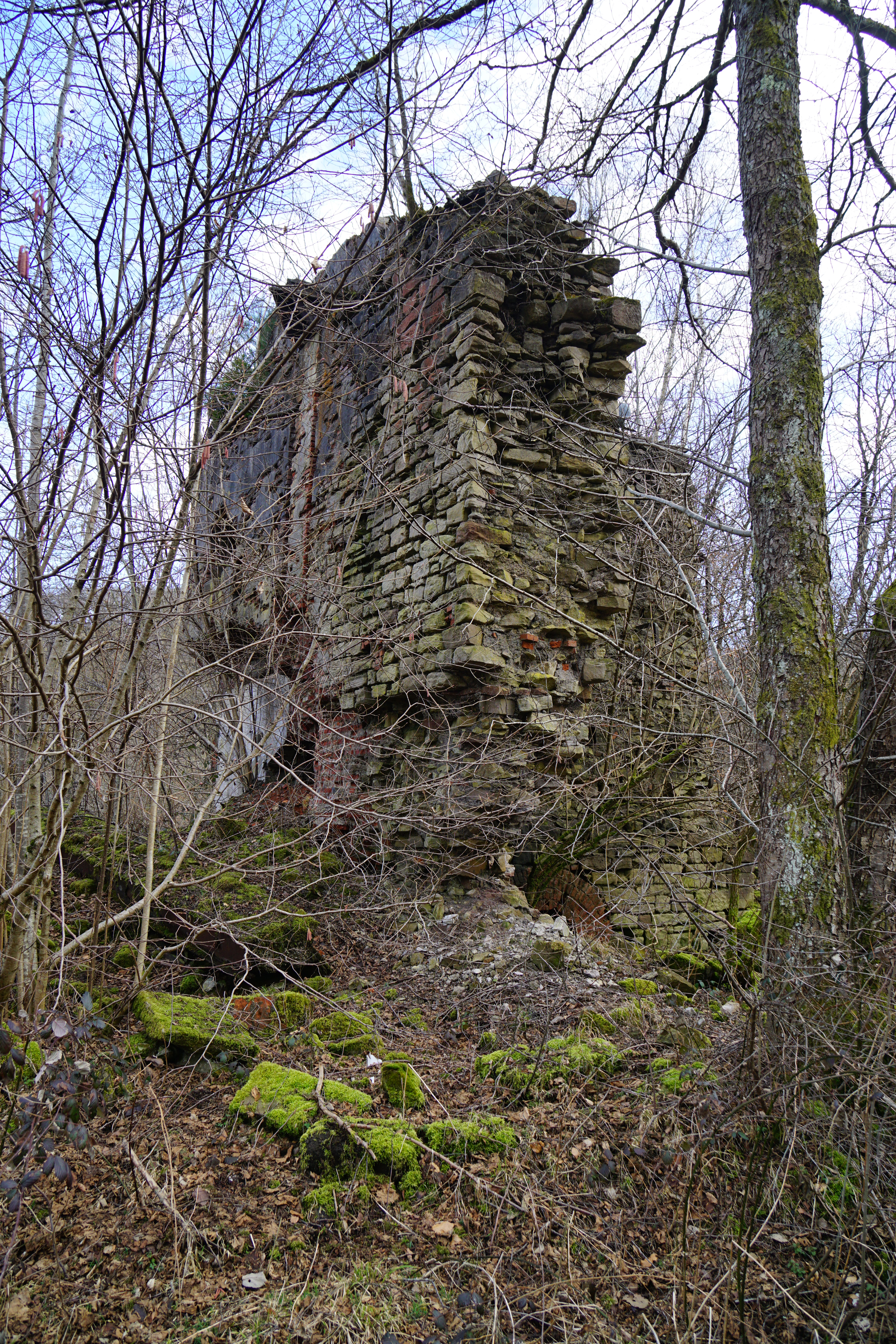

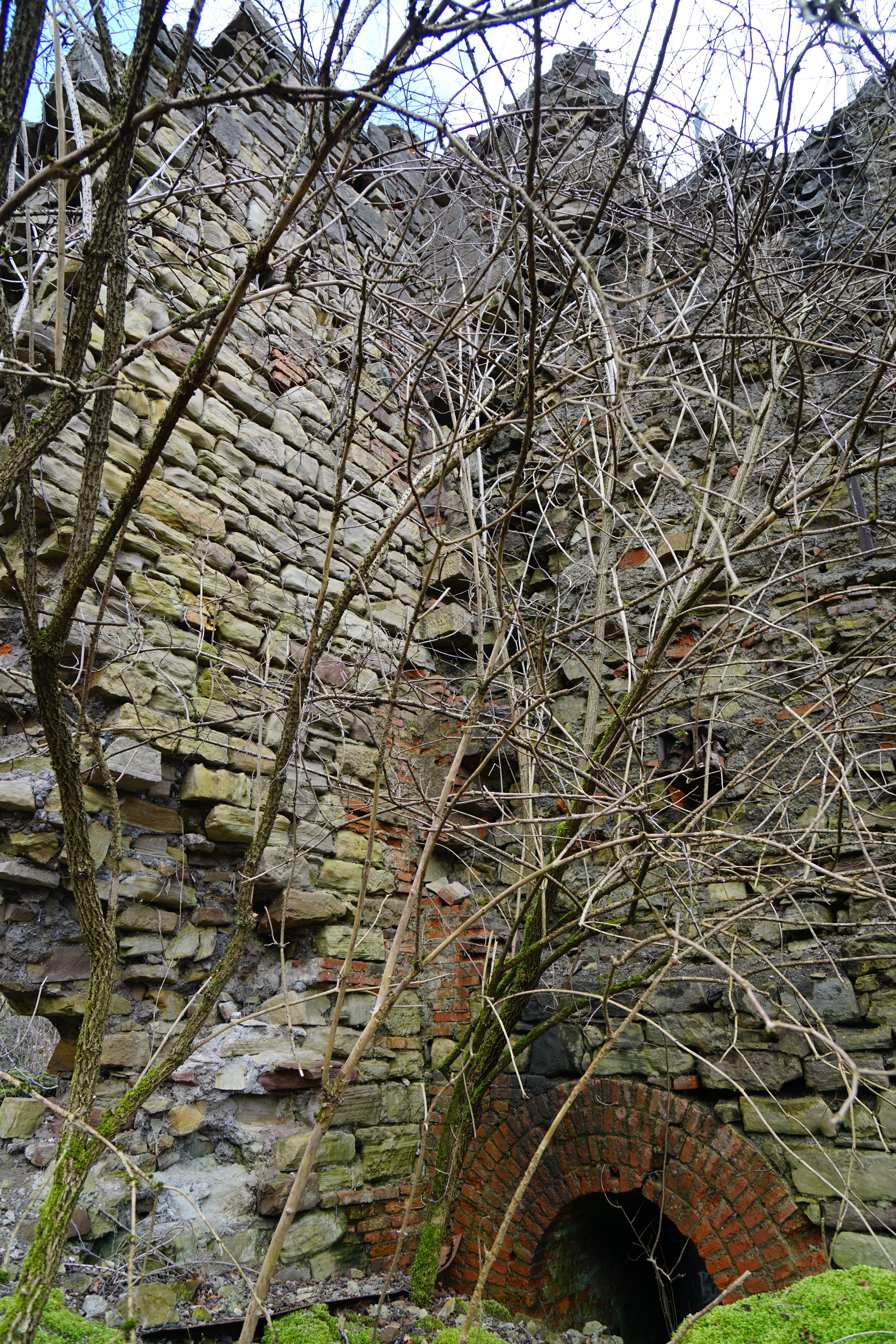

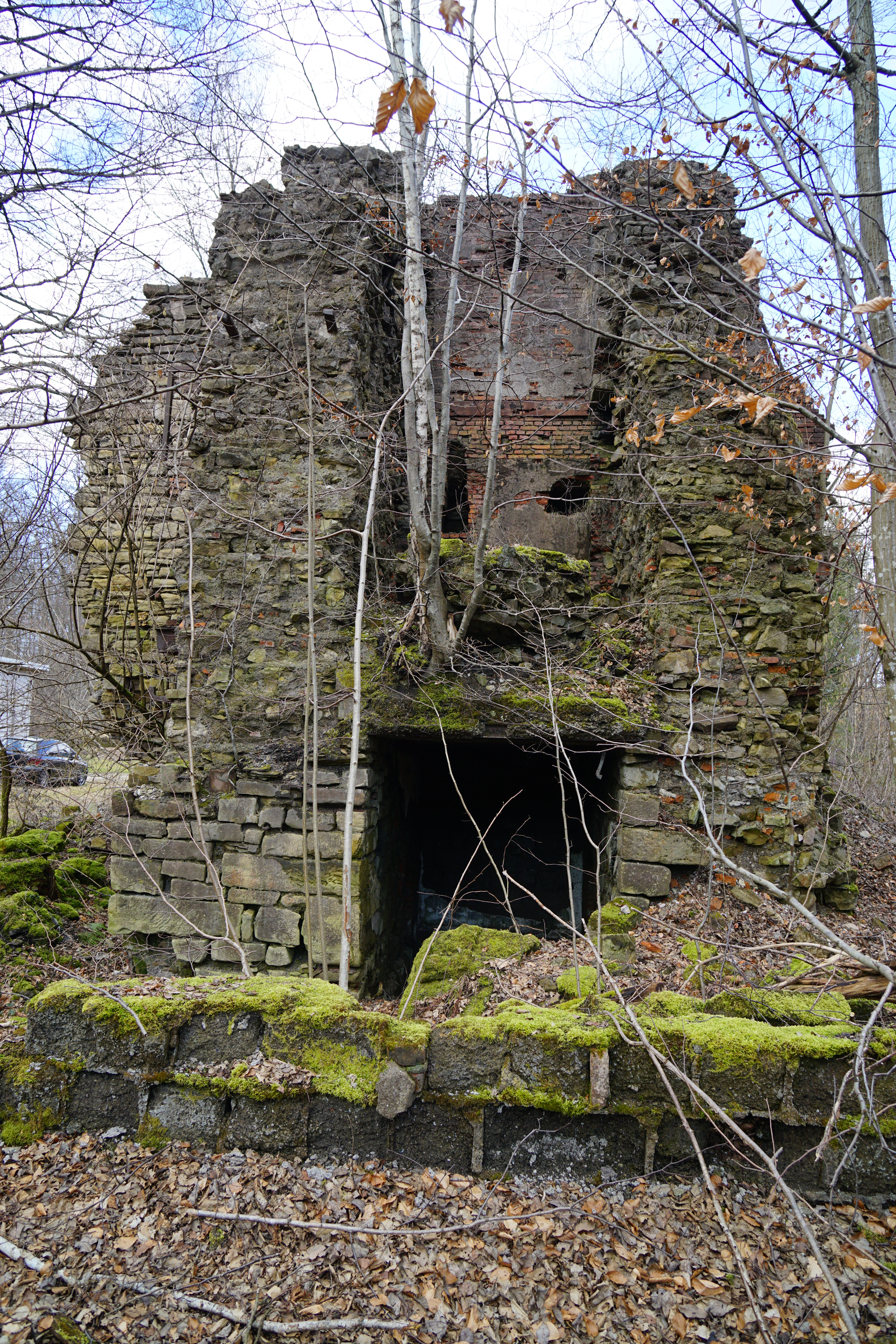

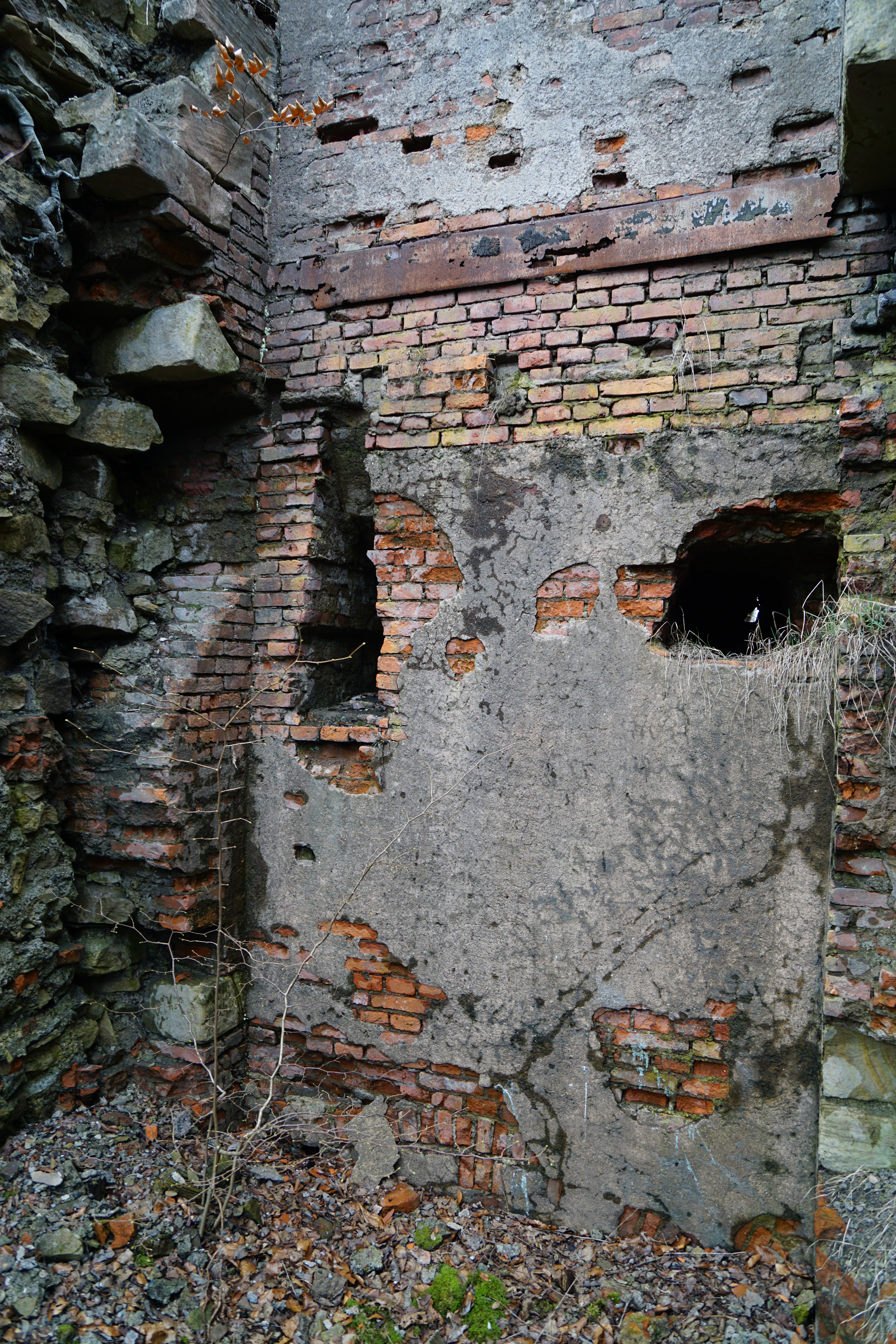

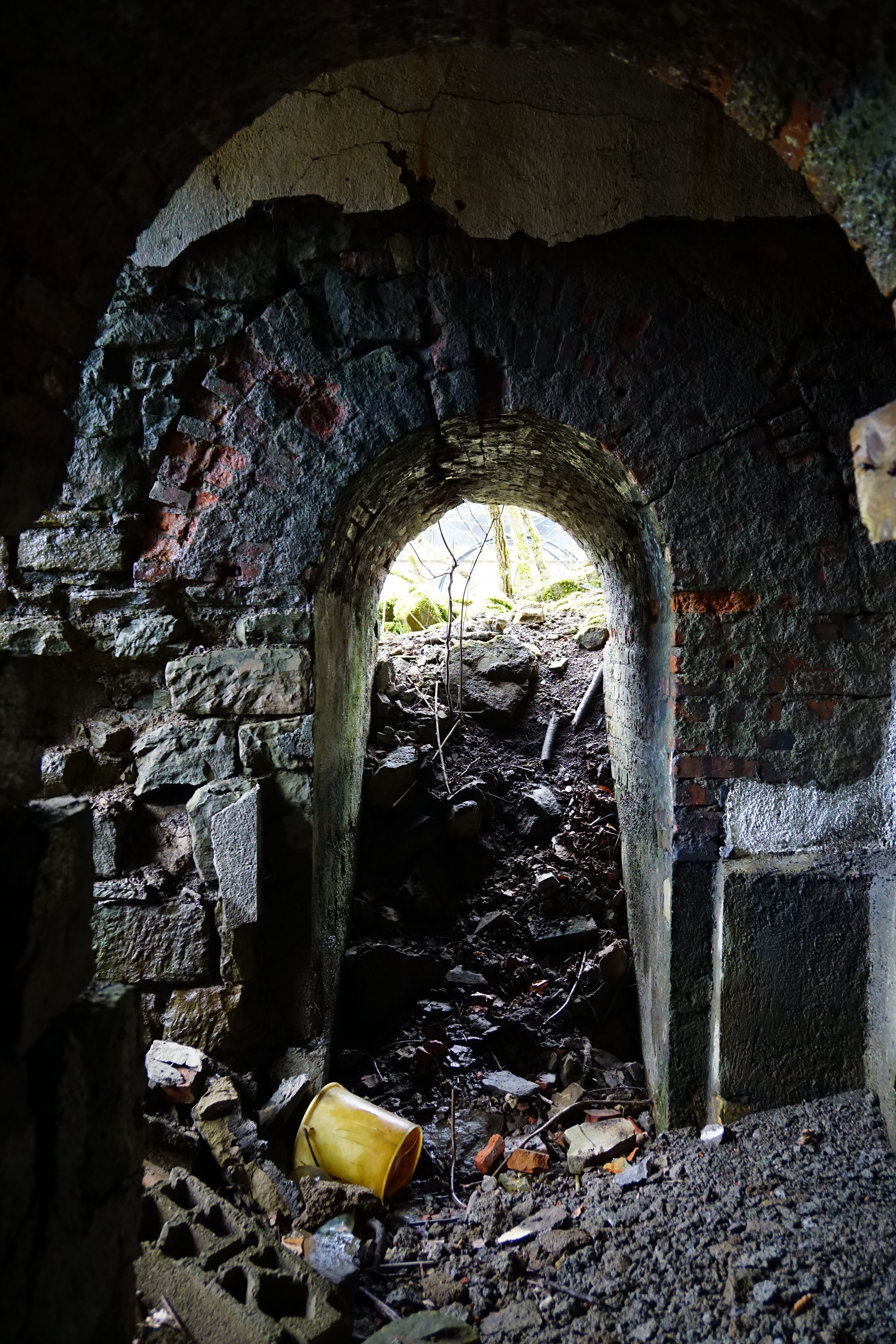

== The city ==
The Magny shaft environment in 1949. Forests Terrils Mine buildings Mining town Woodworking site Water bodies Other construction Railroads

To accommodate the first single Polish immigrants arriving in Ronchamp between the wars, a large temporary dormitory was built on the pit floor. When the housing estate was built, it was converted into apartments and a canteen to accommodate families.

The Magny mining estate was built in 1929 and is divided into two parts. The first part is located along the Clairegoutte road towards Ronchamp, while the second is built between the pit floor and a pond. This mining settlement can accommodate up to 300 miners.

After its closure, the Magny well gave its name to this mining settlement, which became a hamlet attached to the village of Magny-Danigon under the name “Le Puits du Magny ”. The hamlet has no direct road links with the commune, and is served by the D 4 or Route de Clairegoutte, which links Ronchamp and Clairegoutte.

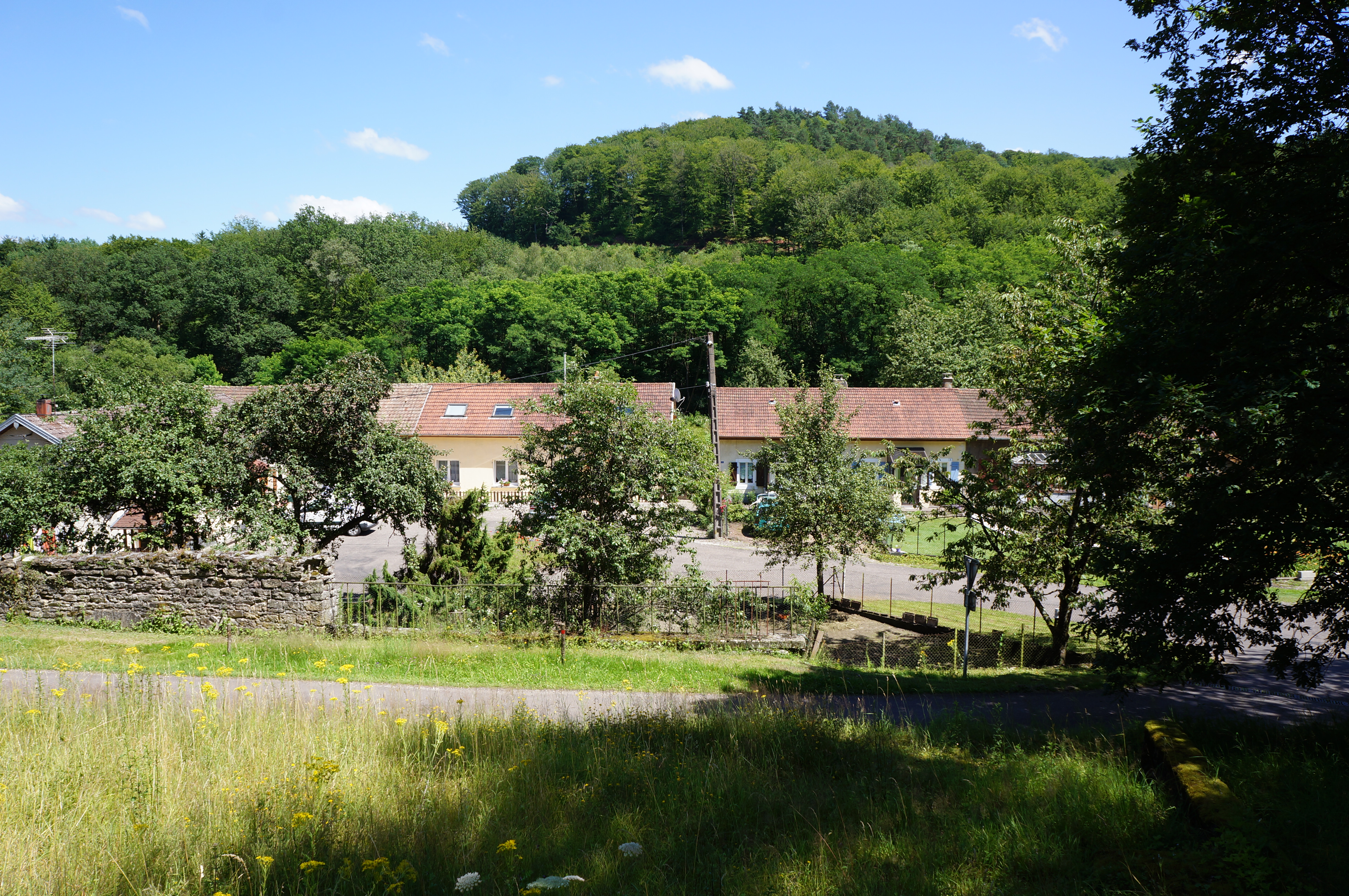
General view of the Magny mining town.

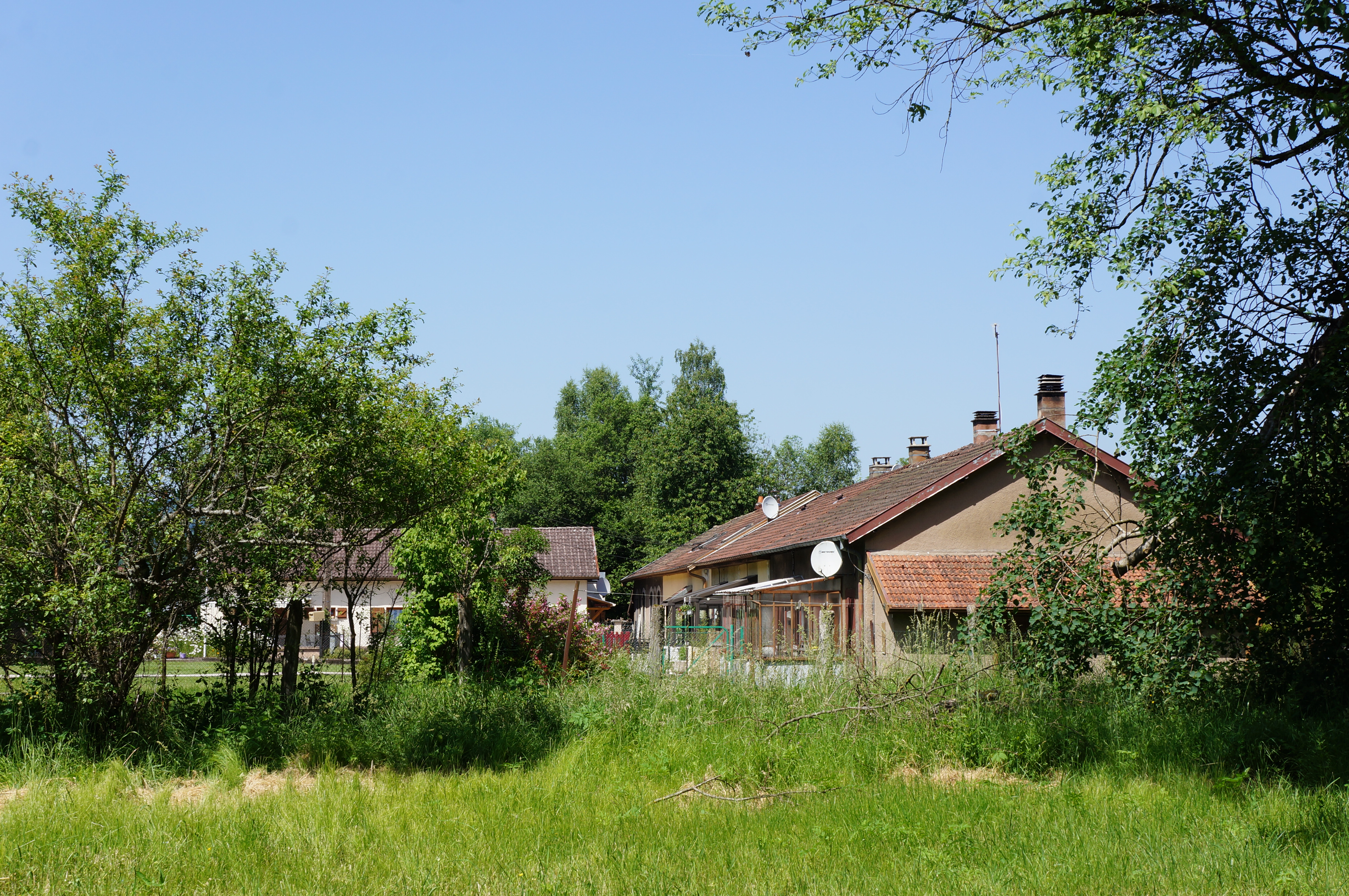
The mining town seen from the south.

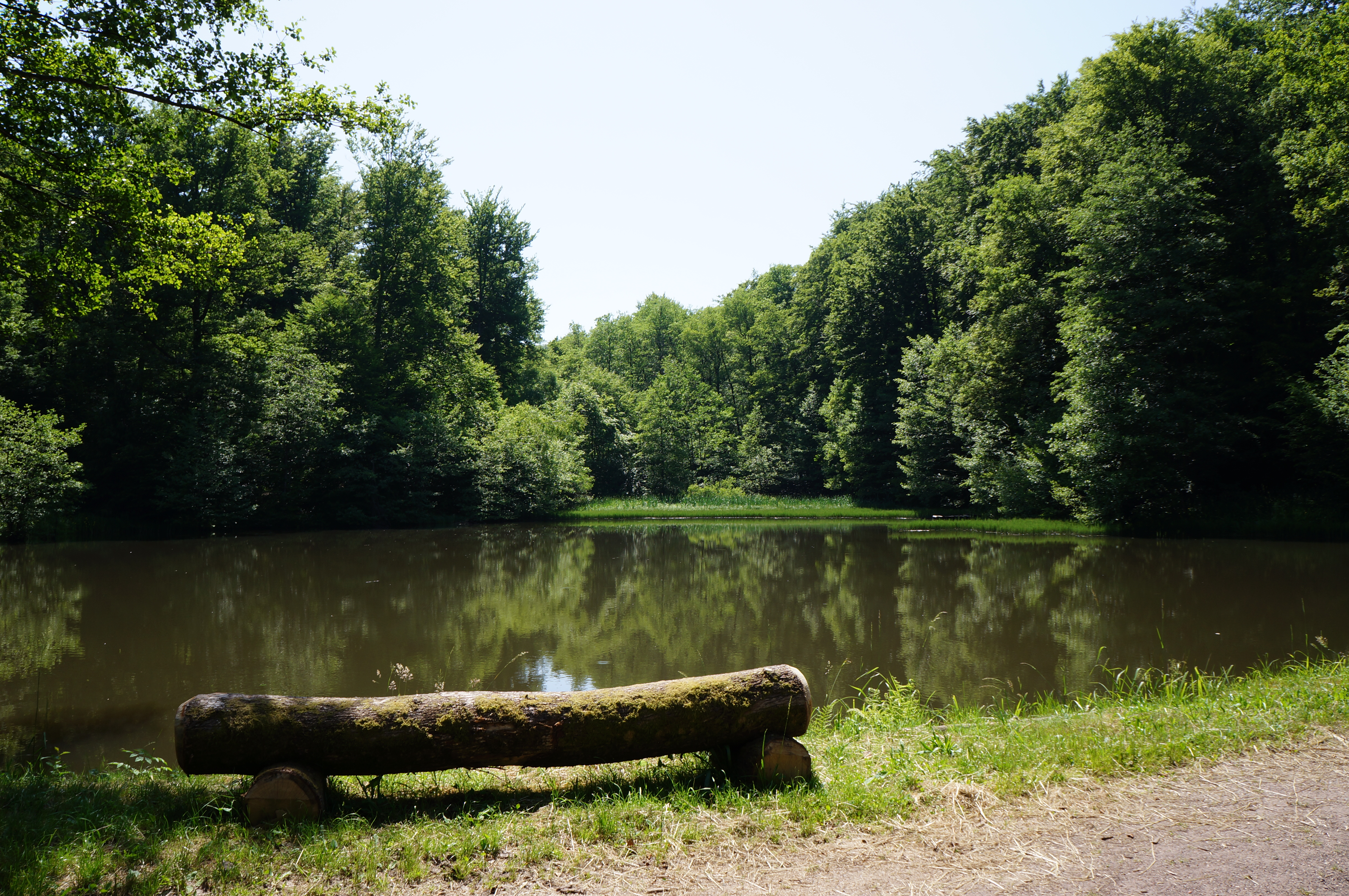
The artificial pond that powered the well's steam engines.

== The slag heap ==
47.6923°N 6.6199°E

The Magny pit has a fairly long, flat slag heap extending as far as the Cenci sawmill, where a small bridge over the Beuveroux stream still stands at the beginning of the 21st century. The slag heap is colonized by birch trees.

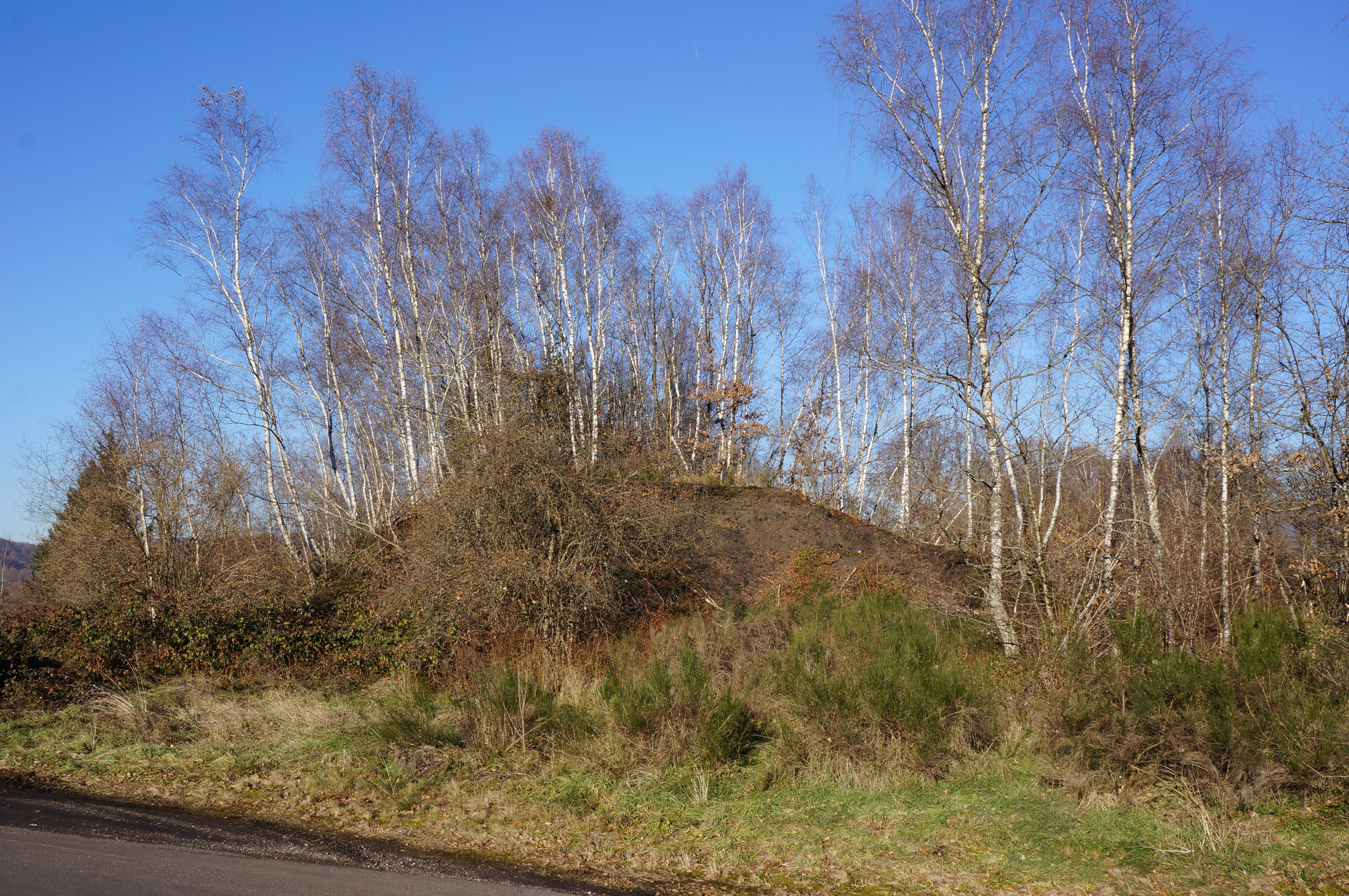
The Magny well slag heap.

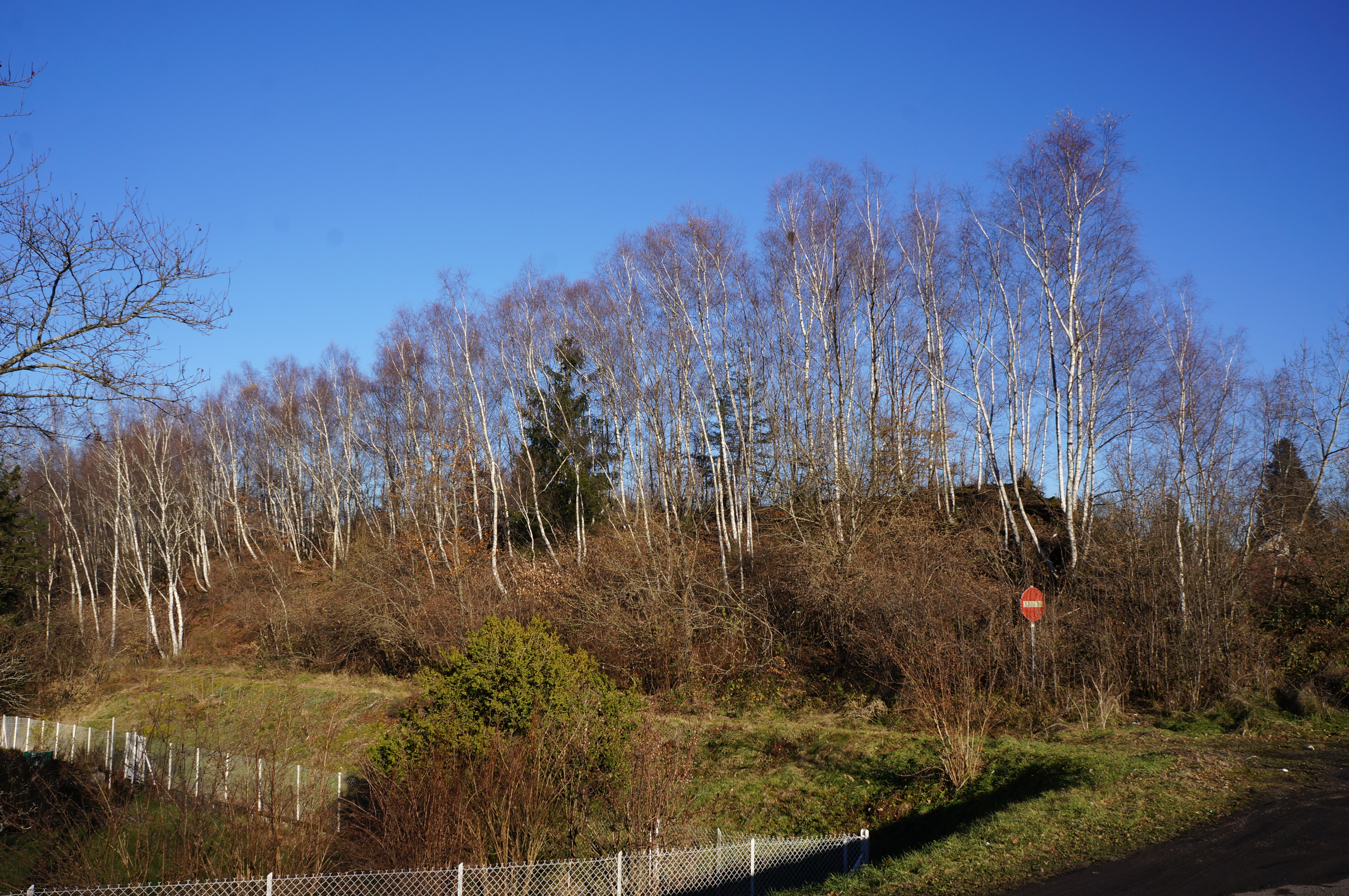
Another view of the slag heap.

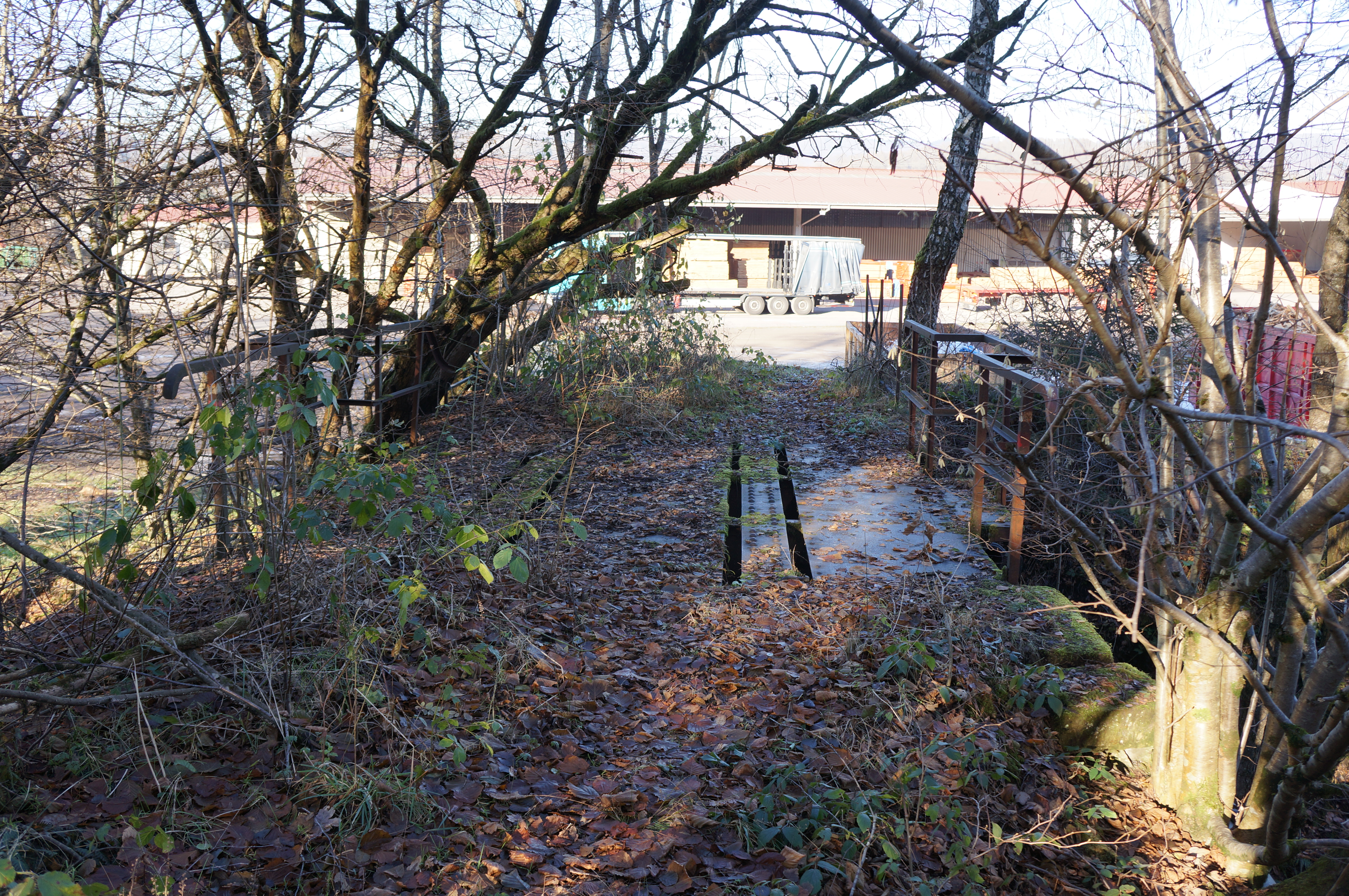
The Beuveroux bridge.

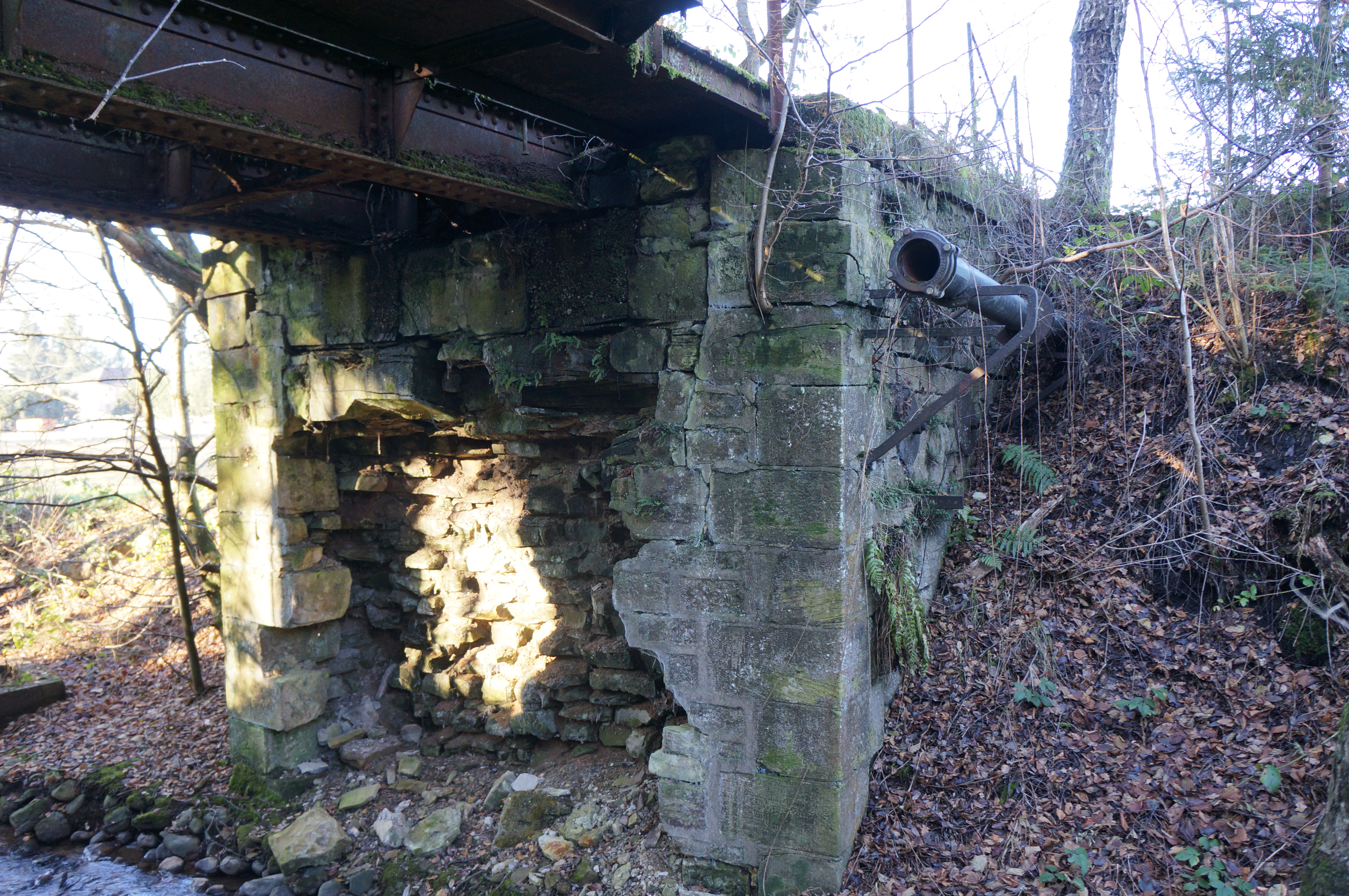
Another view of the bridge.

== See also ==
- Chanois Coal Mine
- Ronchamp coal mines
- Saint-Charles shaft
- Mining basin of Ronchamp and Champagney
- Ronchamp colliery shafts

== Bibliography ==
- Parietti, Jean-Jacques (2001). Les Houillères de Ronchamp vol. I: La mine. Vesoul: Éditions Comtoises. ISBN 2-914425-08-2.
- Parietti, Jean-Jacques (2010). Les Houillères de Ronchamp vol. II: Les mineurs, Noidans-lès-Vesoul, fc culture & patrimoine. ISBN 978-2-36230-001-1.
- Parietti, Jean-Jacques (1999). Les dossiers de la Houillère 5: Le puits du Magny. Association des amis du musée de la mine.
- Parietti, Jean-Jacques (1999a). Les dossiers de la Houillère 4: Le puits d'Éboulet. Association des amis du musée de la mine.
- Parietti, Jean-Jacques; Petitot, Christiane (2005). Géomètre aux houillères de Ronchamp. Association des amis du musée de la mine.

fr:Puits du Magny
