= Henri-Frédéric Iselin =

French sculptor (1826–1905)

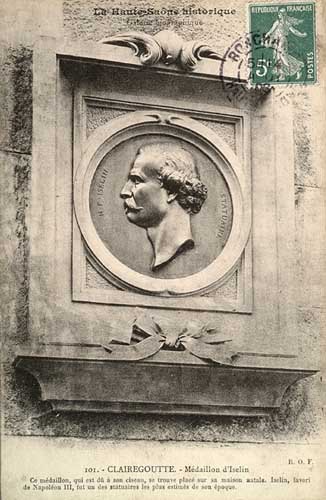

Henri-Frédéric Iselin (1826–1905) was a French sculptor.

Born in Clairegoutte, Haute-Saône, he was a pupil of François Rude. He started at the Salon of 1849 and became famous and successful, sculpting many portraits.

He died in Paris in 1905.

== Main works ==
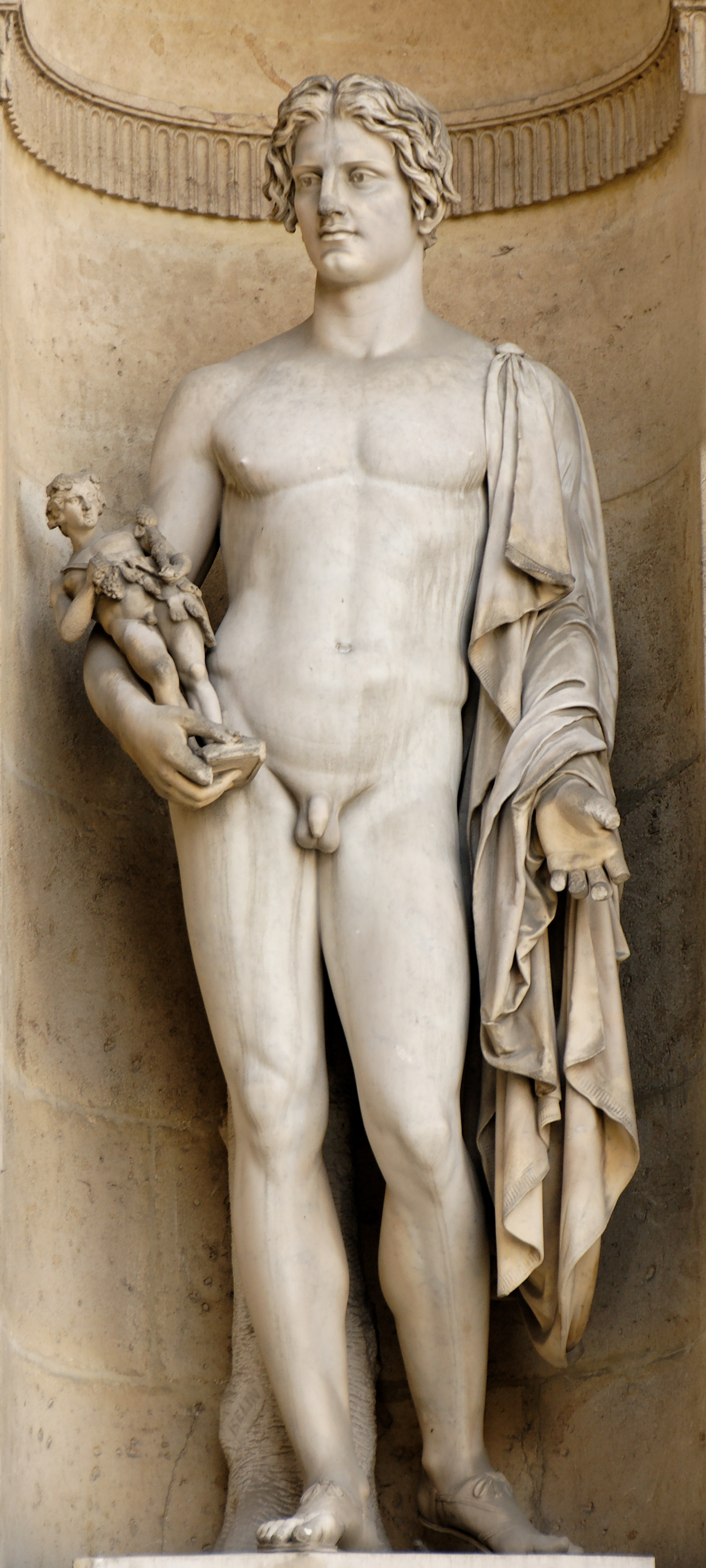
Henri-Frédéric Iselin, Eurypylus, Paris, palais du Louvre.

Iselin created many statues or busts, including those of :

- Napoléon III (Château de Compiègne)
- Eugénie de Montijo (Vesoul, musée Georges-Garret)
- Charles Auguste Louis Joseph, duc de Morny (Deauville and Château de Compiègne)
- Mérimée (Paris, Bibliothèque Nationale)
- Joachim Murat (Versailles, museum)
- Boileau (Paris, musée d'Orsay)
- Claude Bernard (Château de Versailles)
- Mirabeau (Versailles, Salle du Jeu de Paume)
- François Miron (Hôtel de Ville de Paris),
- Louis-Benoît Picard (Paris, Institut de France)
- Denis Poisson (Vesoul, musée Georges-Garret)
- Général de Lamoricière (Vesoul, musée Georges-Garret)
- Louis Lagrange (Vesoul, musée Georges-Garret)
- Pierre Gardel (Paris, Académie nationale de musique)
- L'Élégance (Opéra Garnier)
