= Clairegoutte =

- Commune
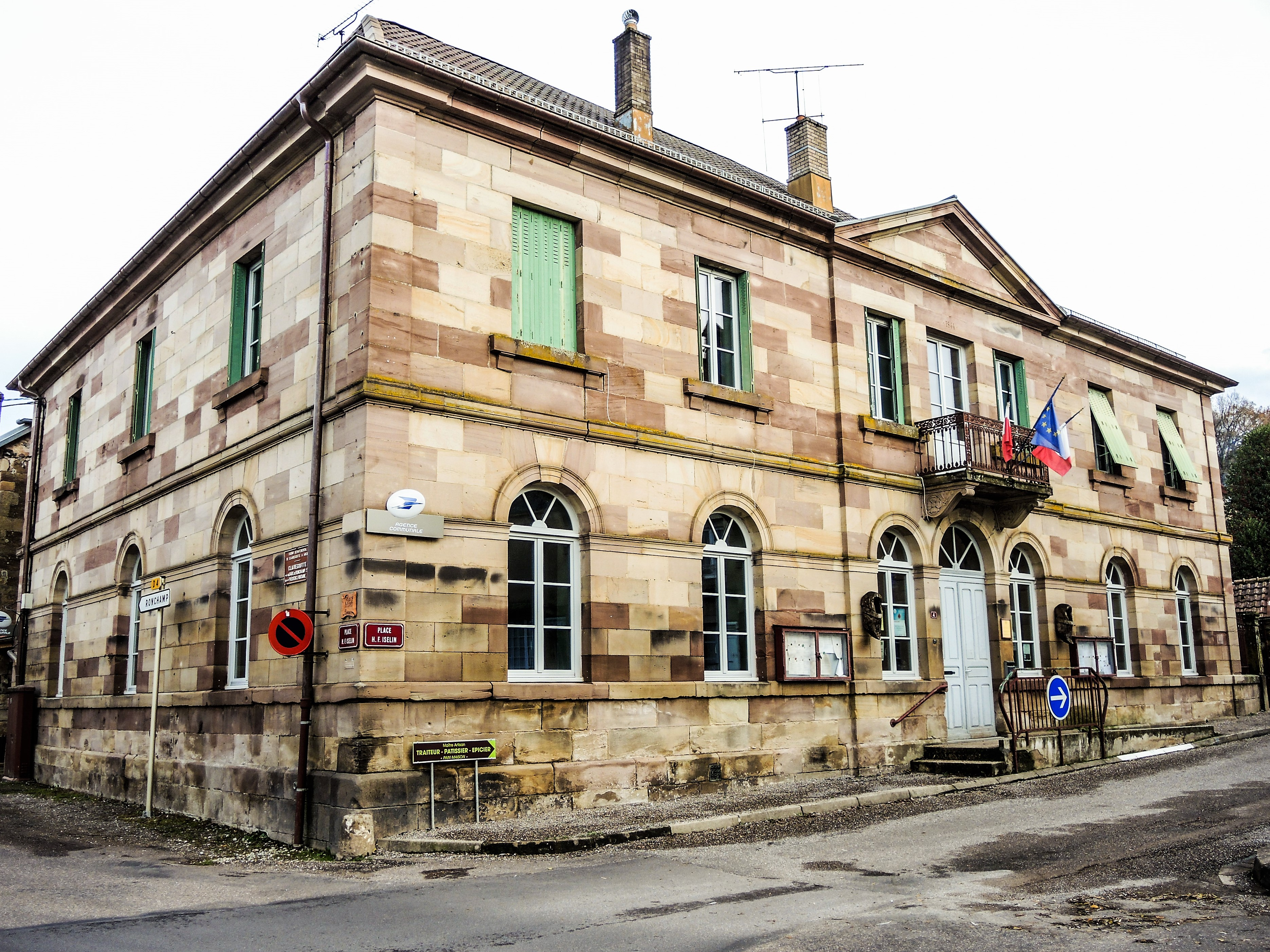
- The town hall in Clairegoutte

- Coat of arms
- Location of Clairegoutte
- Location within France Location within Bourgogne-Franche-Comté
- Coordinates: 47°39′52″N 6°37′20″E
- Country: France
- Region: Bourgogne-Franche-Comté
- Department: Haute-Saône
- Arrondissement: Lure
- Canton: Héricourt-1
- Intercommunality: Rahin et Chérimont

Government
  - Mayor (2020–2026): Gilles Grosjean
- Area^{1}: 10.48 km^{2} (4.05 sq mi)
- Highest elevation: 598 m (1,962 ft)
- Lowest elevation: 305 m (1,001 ft)
- Population (2023): 347
  - Density: 33.1/km^{2} (85.8/sq mi)
- Time zone: UTC+01:00 (CET)
  - Summer (DST): UTC+02:00 (CEST)
- INSEE/Postal code: 70157 /70200
- ^{1} French Land Register data, which excludes lakes, ponds, glaciers > 1 km^{2} (0.386 sq mi or 247 acres) and river estuaries.

Clairegoutte (French pronunciation: [klɛʁɡut]) is a commune in the Haute-Saône department in the region of Bourgogne-Franche-Comté in eastern France. The river Clairegoutte rises here.

== Notable people ==
- Henri-Frédéric Iselin (1826-1905) - sculptor

== See also ==
- Communes of the Haute-Saône department
