= Ronchamp colliery shafts =

Mining shafts in the Ronchamp

The shafts of the three concessions established in the mid-19th century.

The Ronchamp colliery shafts (French, Les puits des houillères de Ronchamp) are a series of collieries undertaken by the various mining companies in the Ronchamp coalfield between the early 19th and mid-20th centuries at Ronchamp, Champagney, and Magny-Danigon, in the Haute-Saône département of France.

== History ==
From 1760 to 1810, coal was extracted by galleries and bures. From 1810 to 1900, twenty-six increasingly deep shafts were dug. In 1950, the twenty-seventh was dug in the Etançon forest. Two of these belonged to the independent Mourière concession, which also dug on a geologically different deposit from the one at Ronchamp. The Société civile des houillères de Ronchamp (SCHR) dug France's deepest shaft twice in succession: the Magny shaft (694 meters) in 1878 and the Arthur de Buyer shaft (1,010 meters) in 1900.

The shafts of the three concessions established in the mid-19th century.

== Background ==
The Ronchamp coalfields were officially discovered in the mid-18th century in the woods above the villages of Ronchamp and Champagney. Two concessions were granted in 1757: that of the Lords of Ronchamp for the commune of Ronchamp, and that of the Prince-Abbots of Lure for Champagney. These were subsequently merged to form a single concession in 1763.

Changes in workforce and coal mining at the Ronchamp pits

Another concession was granted in 1766 to the Prince of Bauffremont at Mourière, a hamlet to the northwest of the coalfield. However, he did not exploit the coal, and it was not until 1844 that Monsieur Grézely fils, in partnership with Messieurs Conrad et consorts, began mining coal, which he continued until 1891, after a change of ownership in 1872.

The Compagnie des maîtres de forge was founded in 1847, and in 1862 obtained a concession to the south of the Ronchamp mining concession. But both companies had spent their money to obtain the Éboulet concession and were forced to merge in 1866. In 1919, the société civile des houillères de Ronchamp changed its legal form to become a société anonyme. When the French coal industry was nationalized in 1946, Électricité de France (EDF) became the owner of the mine until the last shaft was closed in 1958. The concession was relinquished in 1961.

The various shafts sunk in the coalfield are increasingly deep due to the inclined slope of the coal beds. Most shafts are used for coal extraction, but they can also be used for other purposes, such as ventilation, dewatering, or service.

=== Life of the 27 shafts ===
The shafts are colored according to their respective concessions: darker shades indicate periods of coal extraction, and lighter shades indicate other functions or mothballing.

Éboulet concession
Ronchamp concession
Mourière concession

== Saint-Louis shaft ==
47.706895°N 6.653493°E

The Saint-Louis shaft was the first true mine shaft sunk in the coalfield, south of the hamlet of La Houillère. The shaft was the site of the basin's first firedamp explosion, which occurred on April 10, 1824; it killed 20 people and injured 16 others. Later, on May 31, 1830, a second and even more deadly firedamp explosion killed 28 people. The pit was abandoned and backfilled in 1842. After closure, one of the buildings was preserved as a casino and ballroom before being demolished in the 1960s. At the beginning of the 21st century, almost no trace of the installations remains, and the shaft is located under a pavilion at the foot of a hill. A decorative monument built in 2012 recalls the site's mining past.

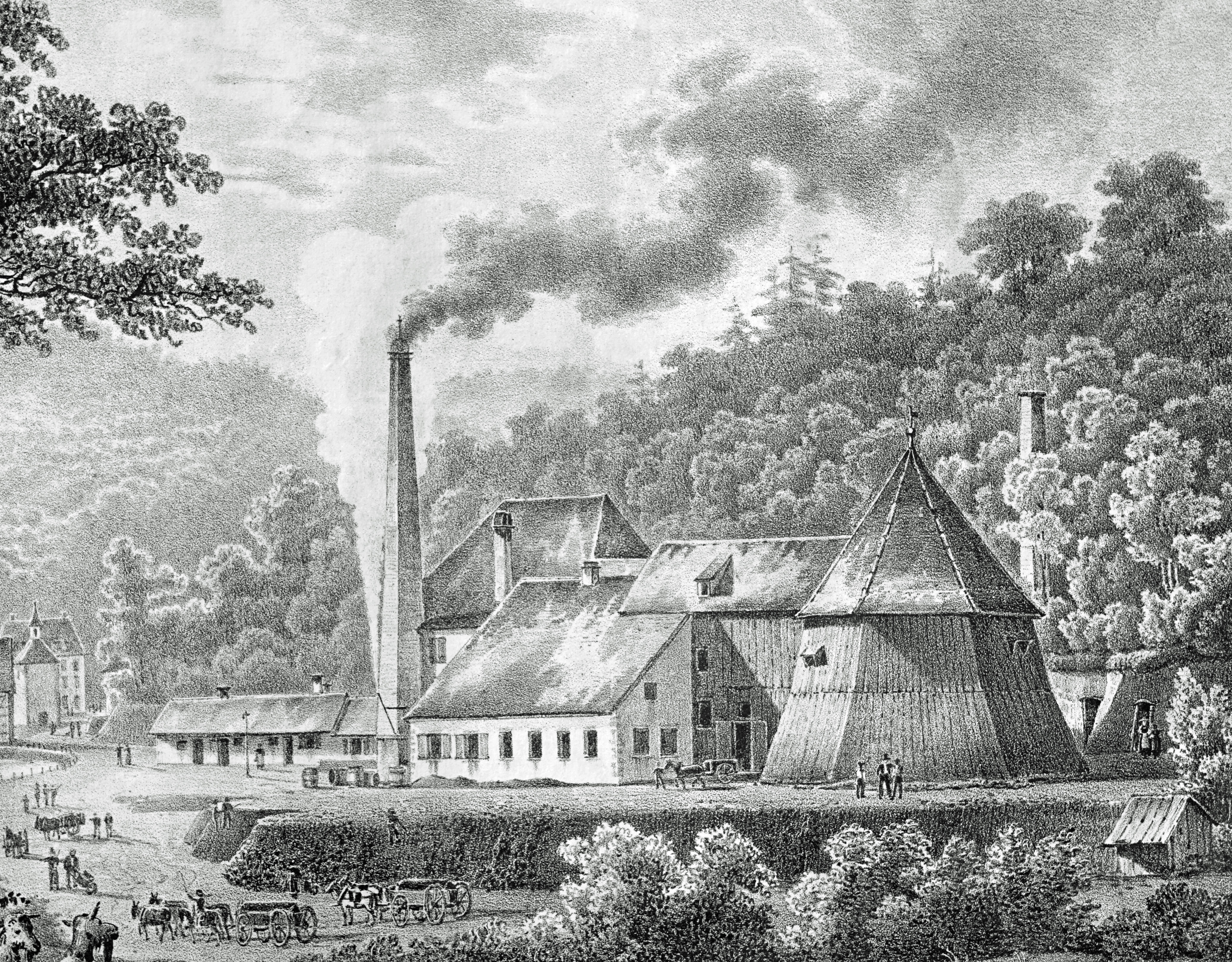
View of the Saint-Louis shaft, 1826

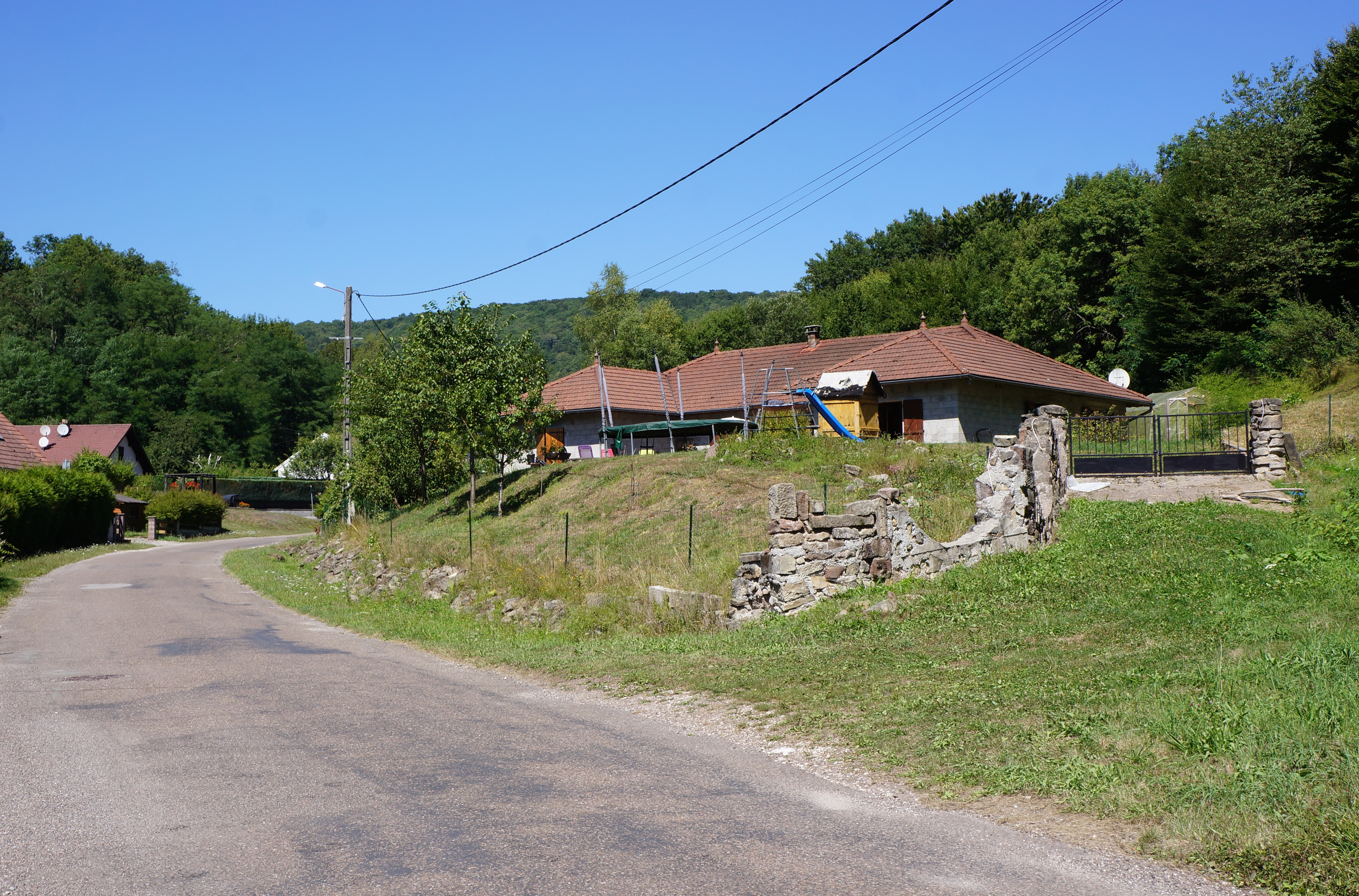
The site of the Saint-Louis shaft

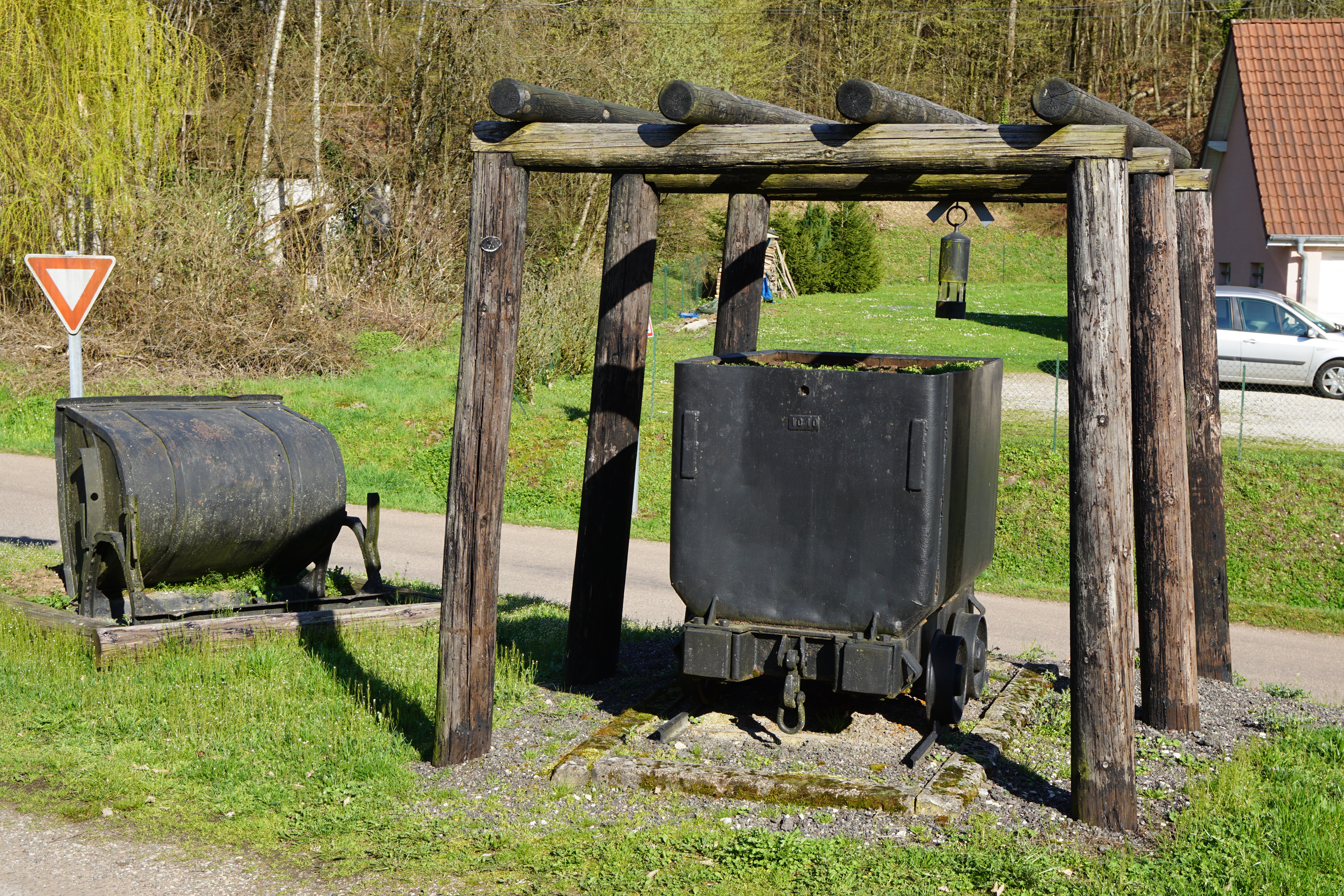
The monument built on the site of the well

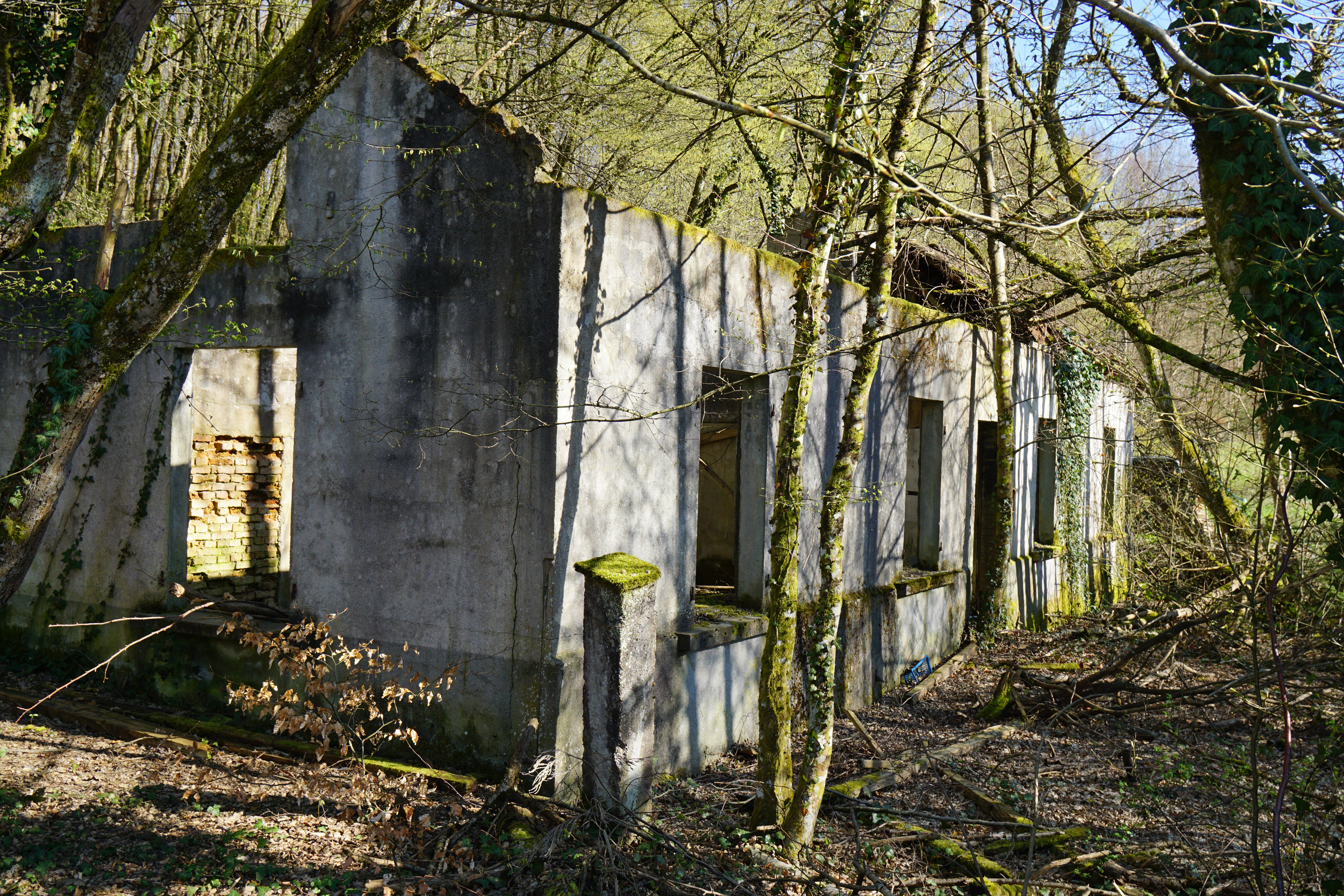
Small outbuilding in ruins

== Henri IV shaft ==
47.708993°N 6.654105°E

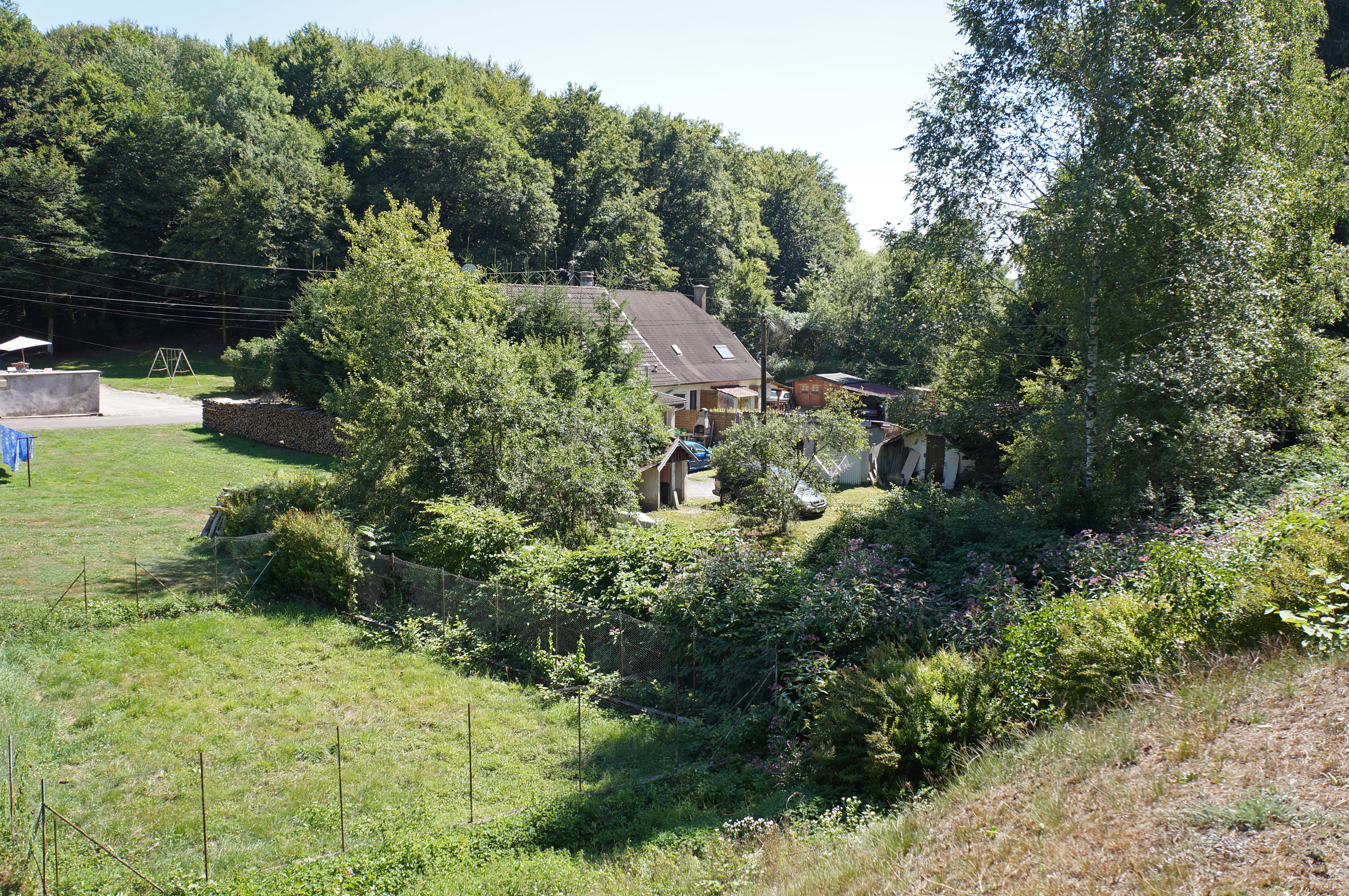
The site of the Henri IV shaft

Shaft sinking began in 1815. In October 1816, it reached the first layer at a depth of 21 meters and a thickness of 1.30 meters. It is used to draw water from the lower workings and discharge it at the level of the large drainage channel; the water is removed from the galleries by hand pumps and then brought to light by ox-driven pumps. These pumps operate at a rate of twelve to fifteen pulses per minute, with a flow rate of 1.5 liters per piston stroke. Finally, other hand pumps were used to convey water to the gully.

On May 12, 1823, he crossed the second layer some twenty meters below the first. This layer is 1.6 meters thick, including 0.3 meters of sterile rock. It is mined by the Cantine and Carrière galleries, despite a limited mining area. On June 15, 1830, the Henri IV shaft reached a depth of 61 meters. It serves as an air return for the Saint-Louis shaft. In 1830, production at the latter was 7,200 tons, with a workforce of 35 miners and 29 laborers.

In 1833, just as the second layer was about to be exhausted at the Henri IV and Saint-Antoine wells, a third vein (a schistose and pyritic vein), 1.80 meters thick, was mined. Work was abandoned in 1835. During the Etançon disaster in December 1950, this shaft and the Petit-Pierre shaft reopened under water pressure. A plum tree was completely swallowed up in the hole formed by the Henri IV well. Both shafts were backfilled with shalek.

At the beginning of the 21st century, the well was located in the courtyard of a house.

== Samson shaft ==
47.708116°N 6.64646°E

The location of the shaft was chosen to the west of the Basvent gallery (located in the hamlet of La Houillère) and 140 meters southwest of the orifice of the large drainage channel. Sinking of the shaft began on October 1, 1822 in the Etançon valley. It was stopped at a depth of 17 meters due to a heavy influx of water, requiring 225 to 250 60-liter water skips to be hauled up every 24 hours, representing a flow rate of 13.8 m^{3} per day. The well is 3.6 meters long and 1.6 meters wide and is equipped with ladders. When abandoned, the well cost 200 francs per meter dug. Sinking resumed in April 1824 and the first layer reached 18.66 meters. The shaft was stopped at a depth of 19 meters and abandoned the same year due to the poor quality of the coal and the influx of water. In fact, the shaft fell on an uplift in the ground that compressed the two layers of coal to the point of bringing them almost into contact and flattening them.

At the beginning of the 20th century, the well site was invaded by the Fourchie pond, fed by the large drainage channel. A house built on the site was also invaded but later destroyed by fire in the 1930s. The ruins remained until the 1970s. In 1952, the Samson shaft (a gallery built from the surface) was dug not far from the old well, bypassing the old drowned workings. At the beginning of the 21st century, the shaft was located in a swamp not far from the outcrop mining circuit.

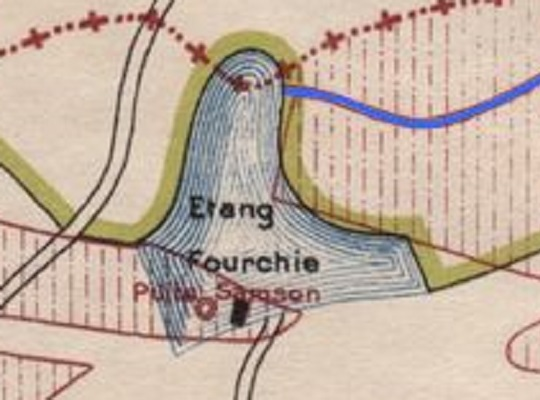
The pit site, invaded by Fourchie pond

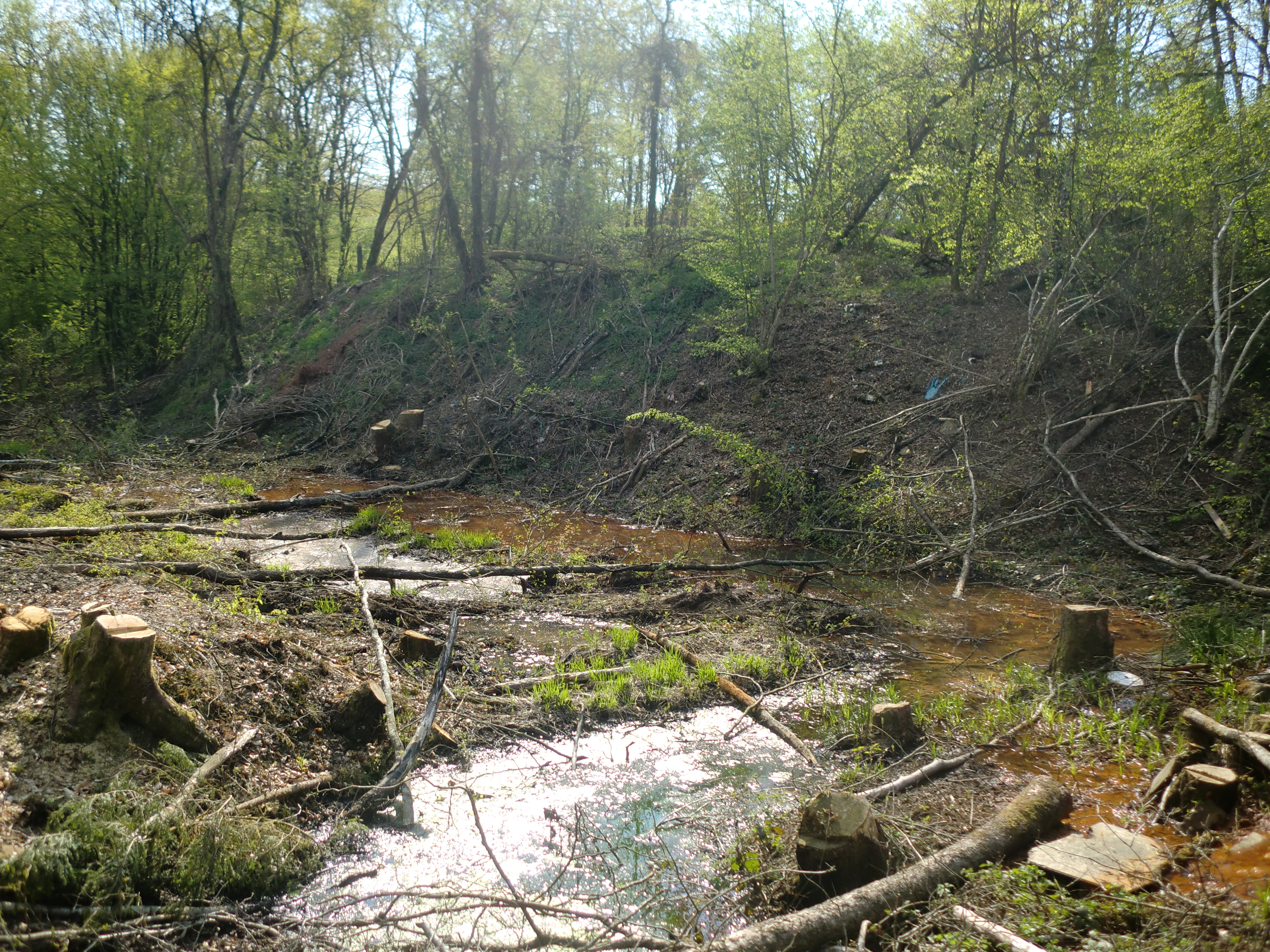
Fourchie pond

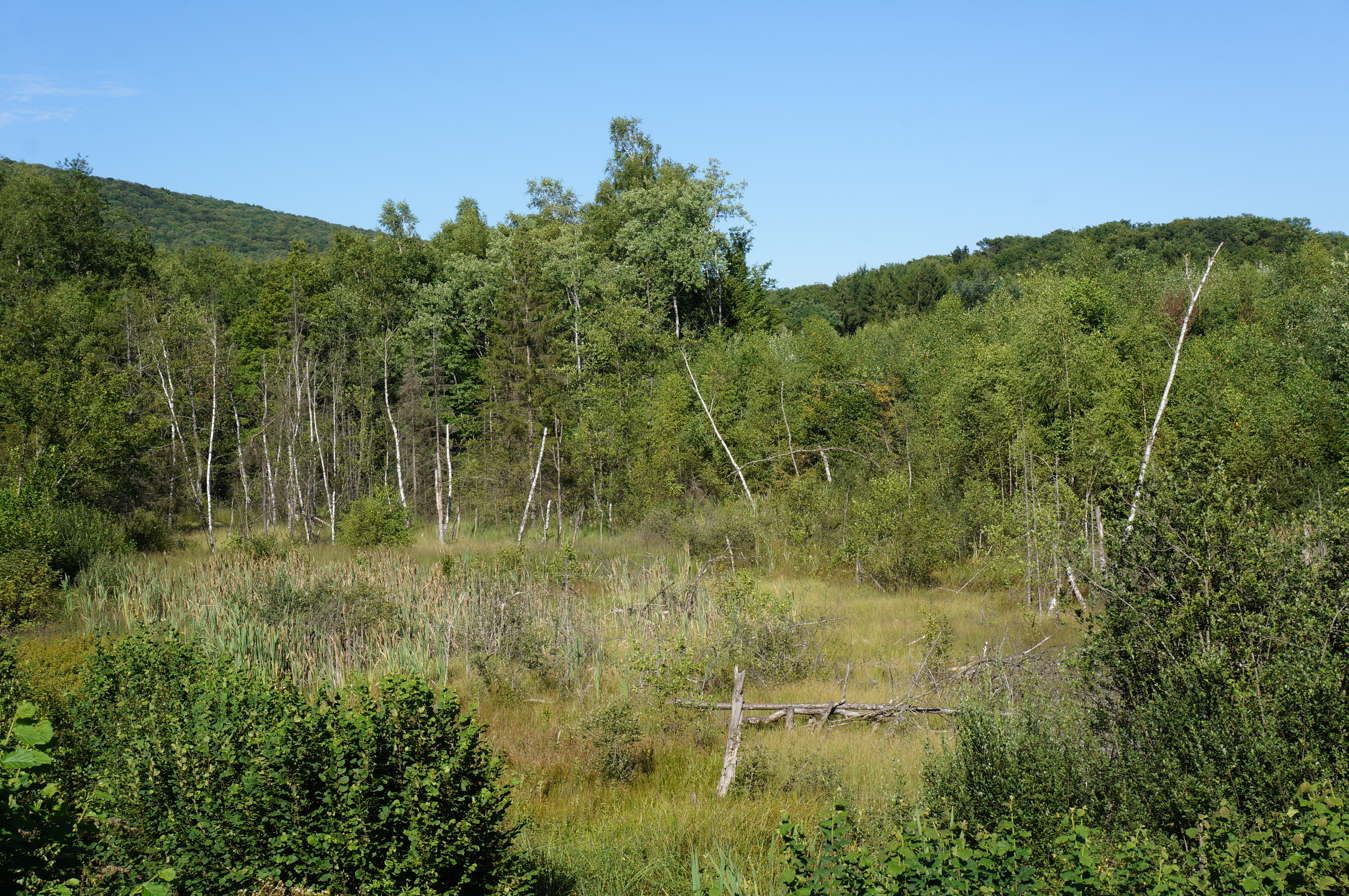
Swampy area where the Samson well is located

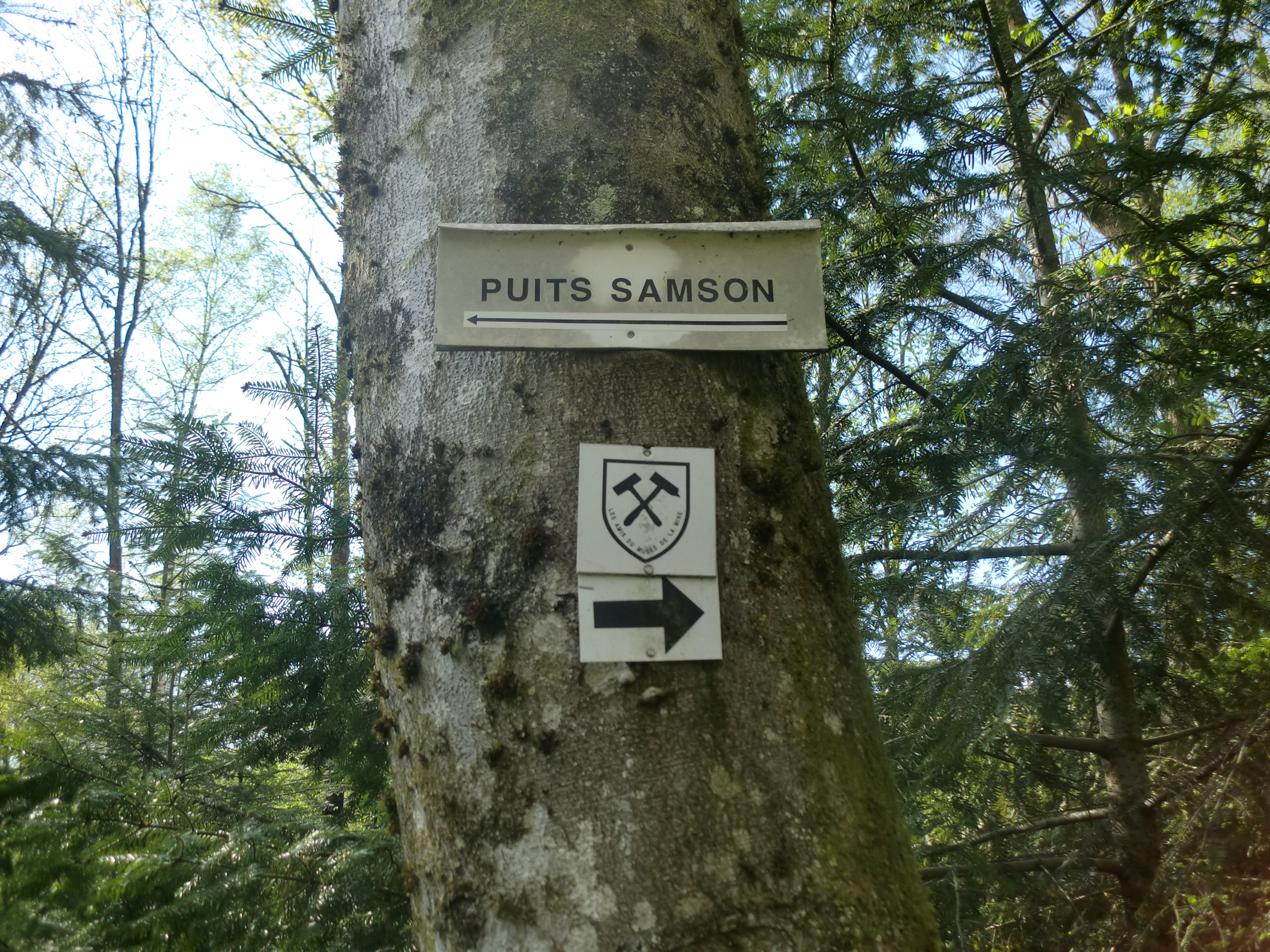
The sign indicating the Samson well

== Shaft n^{o}. 1 ==
47.707906°N 6.670284°E

Sinking of the shaft began in June 1825 at "La Bouverie", at the foot of the Chevanel wood, which had long been mined by drifting. Digging was subcontracted to the d'Andlau company, with the workers supplying the powder and oil. The upper section is lined with a 15-meter-high casing. The average depth is 6 meters per month. The workers are also responsible for tool maintenance and frame installation. At a depth of 149 meters, they encounter a 2.25-metre vein encased in a 0.35-metre layer of sandstone. A 12-horsepower steam engine is installed for extraction. The coal is transported in 400 kg Anzin-model carts on a rail track.

Between 1828 and 1830, production at the shaft rose from 6,000 to 12,000 tonnes a year, and the workforce grew from 36 miners and 40 laborers to 64 miners and 54 laborers. In 1831, the wagons were loaded onto trays and brought to daylight. It was at this time that an extraction cage was first used in a shaft at the Ronchamp mines. In the same year, the shaft was deepened by 24 meters, and a 320-meter-long research gallery was sunk to the east, but to no avail. In 1833, the strangulation of the coal seams put an end to mining. At the beginning of the 21st century, the shaft was a four-meter-diameter water hole at the edge of the Paris-Basel railway line.

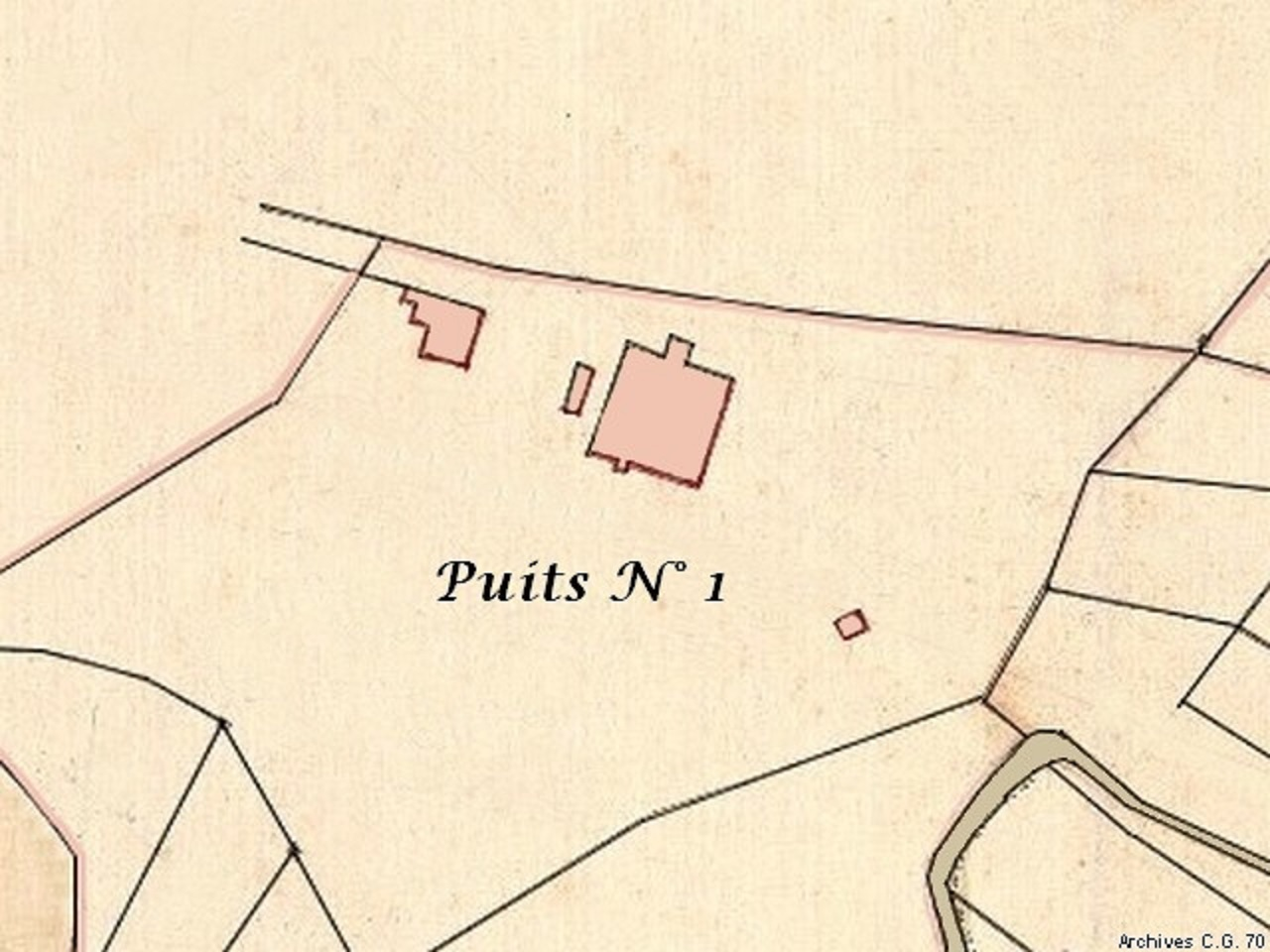
Plan of well installations

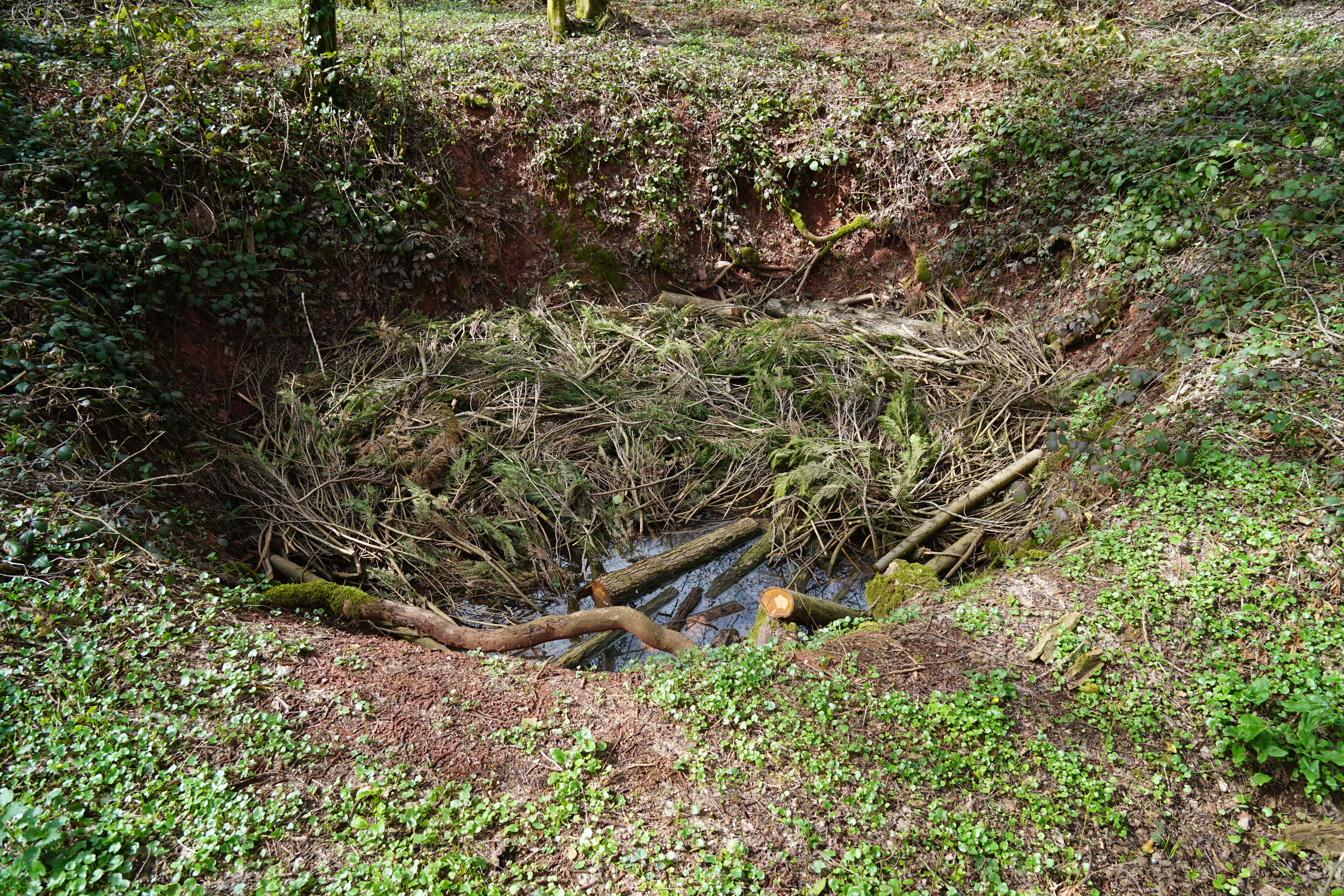
Remains of shaft n^{o}. 1

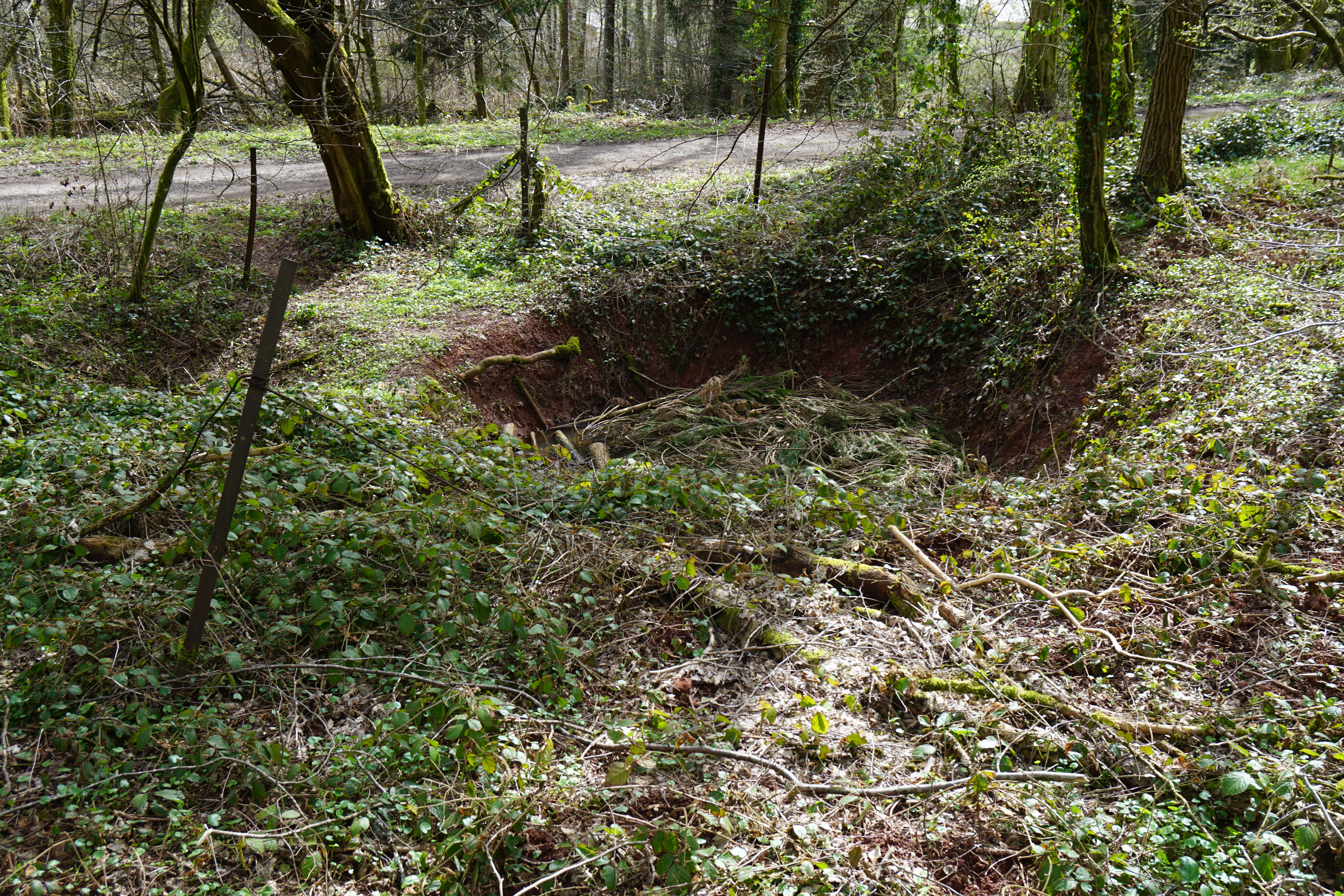
Remains of fence around the well

== Shaft n^{o}. 2 ==
47.705328°N 6.662416°E

The shaft was sunk in June 1825 towards the Rahin river and received a casing with a picot casing over 21 meters. (Note: A picot is a wooden wedge used to clamp the joist, in the picotage of a well.) At a depth of 116 meters, it encountered carbonaceous schists. Some reconnaissance work was carried out, with little result. The cuttings were hauled up by a horse-drawn baritel, later replaced by the steam engine at the Saint-Louis shaft. Shaft digging was stopped at a depth of 126.6 meters.

In November 1828, a 120-meter-long research gallery was dug in the up-dip area, but to no avail. In November 1829, a travers-banc in the down-dip part of the work was also cancelled. Later, in a westerly direction, a number of cuttings were installed. Between 1828 and 1830, production at the shaft rose from 0 to 180 tonnes a year, and the workforce increased from 8 miners and 4 labourers to 12 miners and 10 labourers. In 1833, research was carried out, but was abandoned, showing that the shaft had been dug on an uplift in the coalfield. It was decided to abandon the shaft. The installation of a 70 hp steam engine, initially envisaged, was canceled due to high costs.

At the beginning of the 21st century, the well site was located at the foot of the hills overlooking the communes of Ronchamp and Champagney.

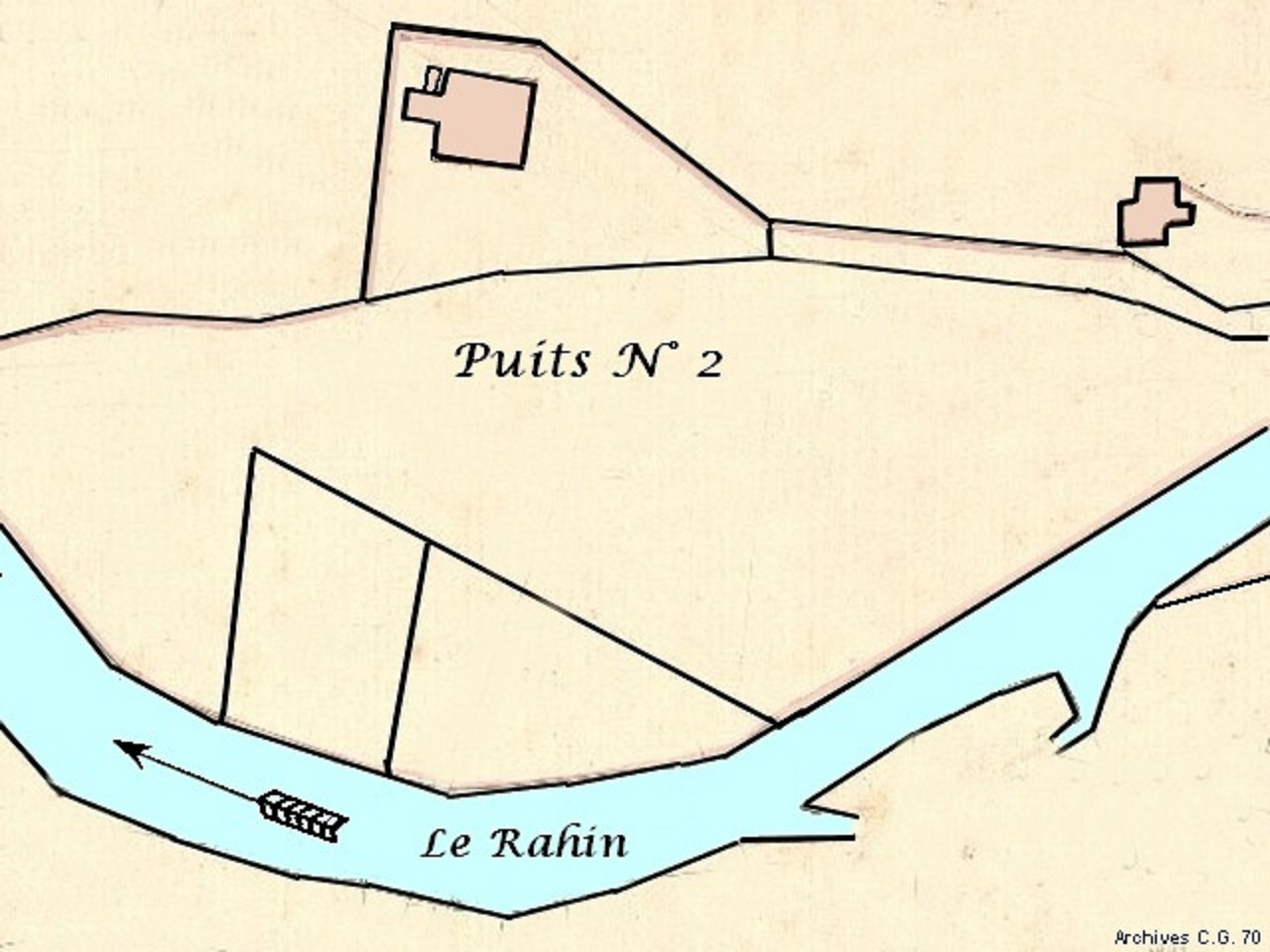
Plan of the well facilities towards Rahin

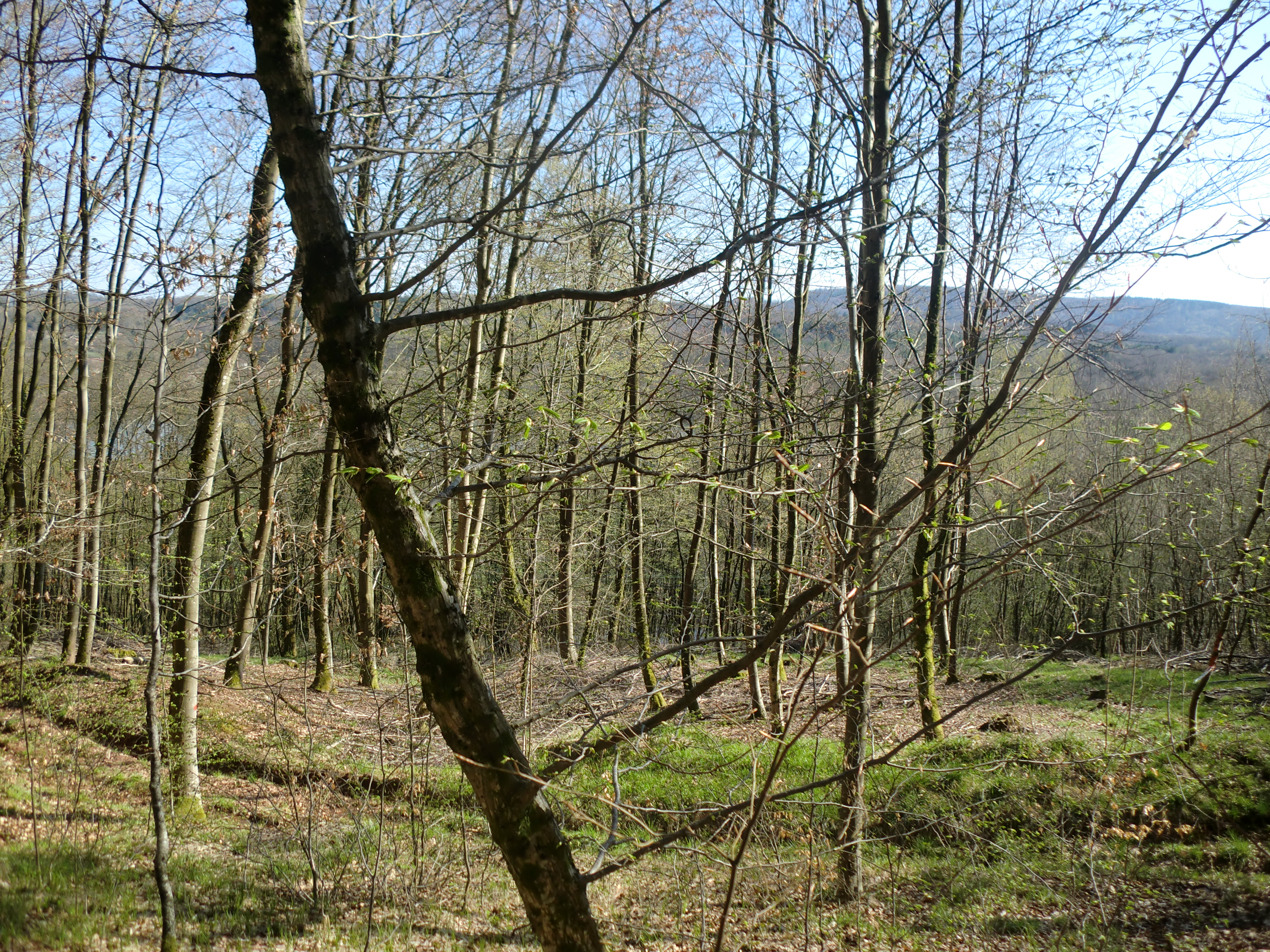
Hill overlooking the site of Shaft N^{o}. 2

== Shaft n^{o}. 3 ==
47.713041°N 6.662915°E

Sinking of shaft n^{o}. 3 began at the end of 1825, north of the large drainage channel, in the ground where there was still a lot of coal. It reached a depth of 38.5 meters and tapped the upper part of the Galerie du Cheval, as well as the downstream parts of the Grande Rigole. It is served by a horse-drawn arena. The area is notoriously unstable, with dozens of mine quarters collapsing between 1811 and 1813. Shaft n^{o}. 3 was abandoned in August 1828 after producing 9,000 tons of coal with a workforce of 54 miners and 60 laborers.

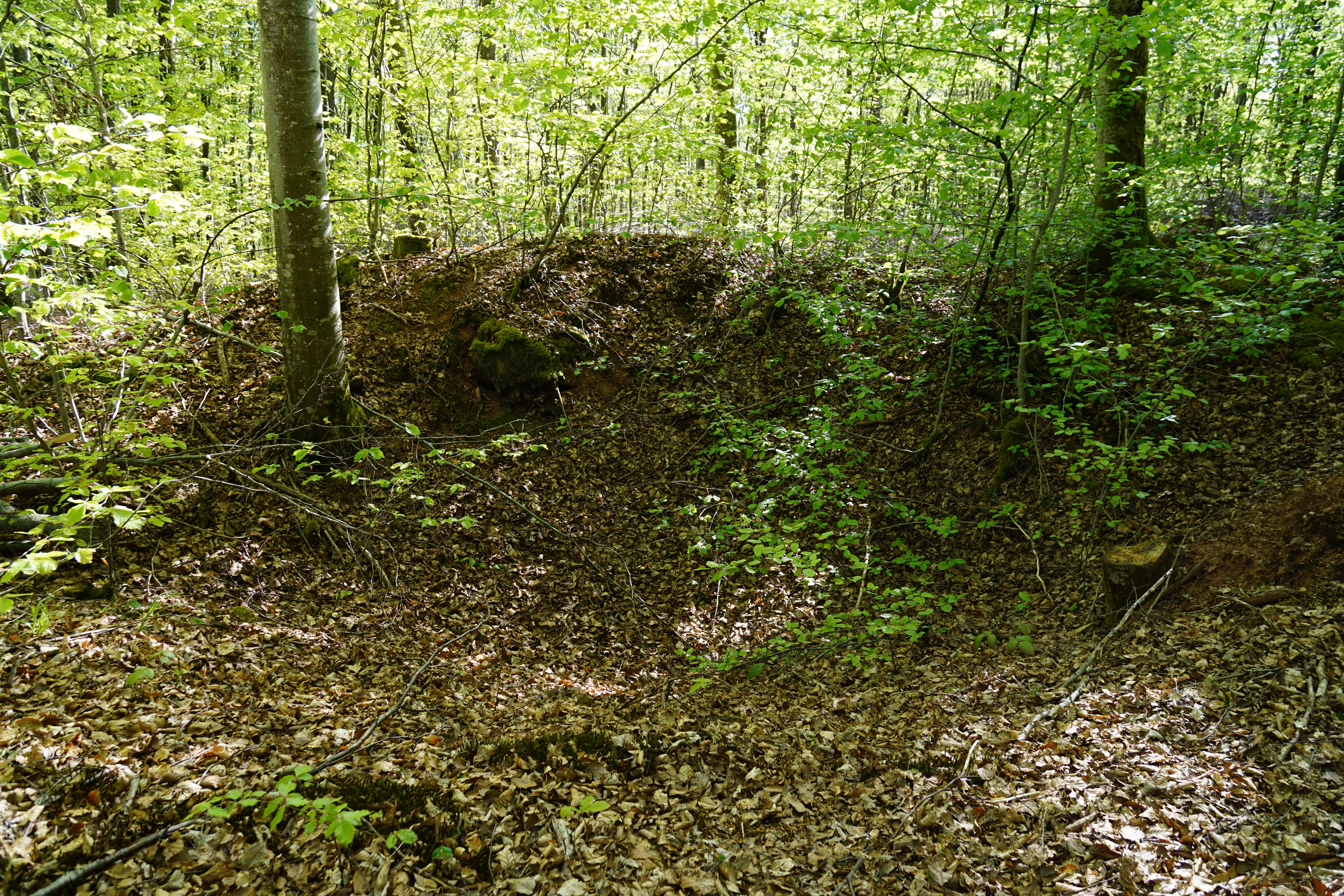
Remains of shaft n^{o}. 3

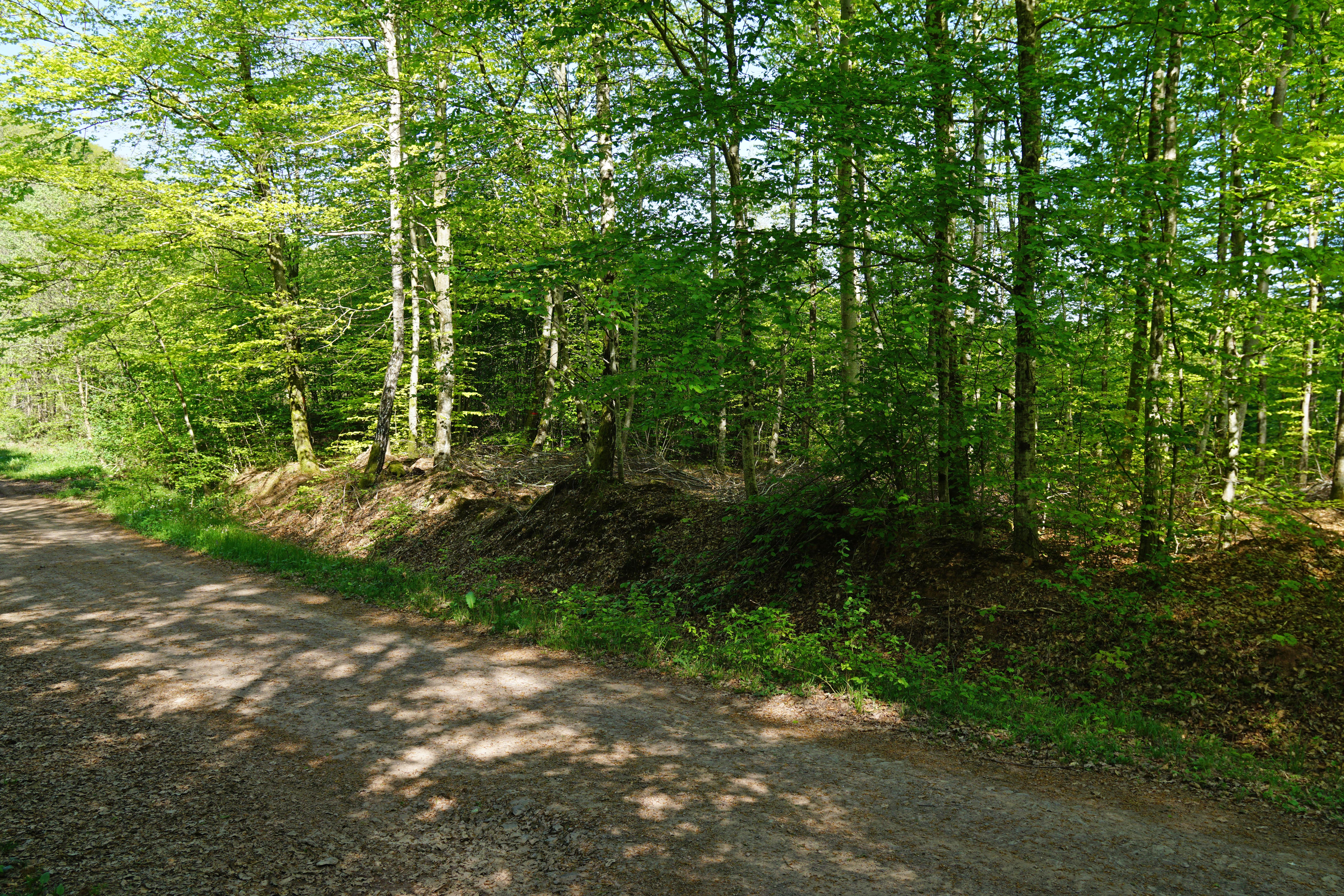
The remains of the slag heap

== Shaft n^{o}. 4 ==
47.711306°N 6.665579°E

Sinking of the shaft began in April 1829 on the advice of a master miner 90 meters south of shaft n^{o}. 3, in an area where a 1,700 m^{3} panel existed between the eastern part of the Cheval works and the large drainage channel. (Note: A panel is a large mineralized surface in a mining deposit.) In 1830, the shaft produced 2,880 tons of coal with a workforce of 8 miners and 60 laborers. Served by a baritel, it was backfilled around 1840. At the beginning of the 21st century, shaft n^{o}. 4 was a small funnel-shaped subsidence in the forest close to a road.

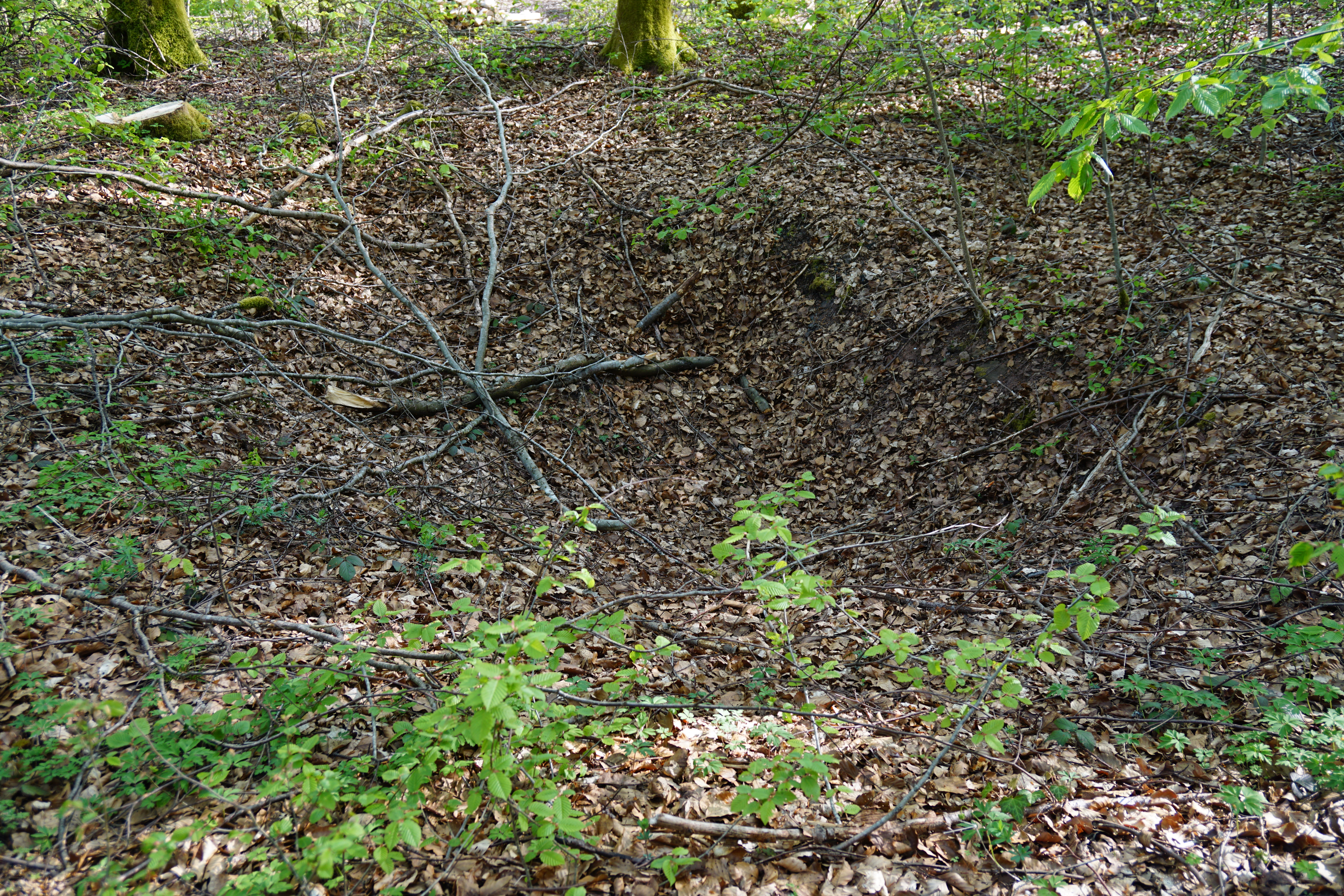
Funnel-shaped hole, remnant of shaft n^{o}. 4

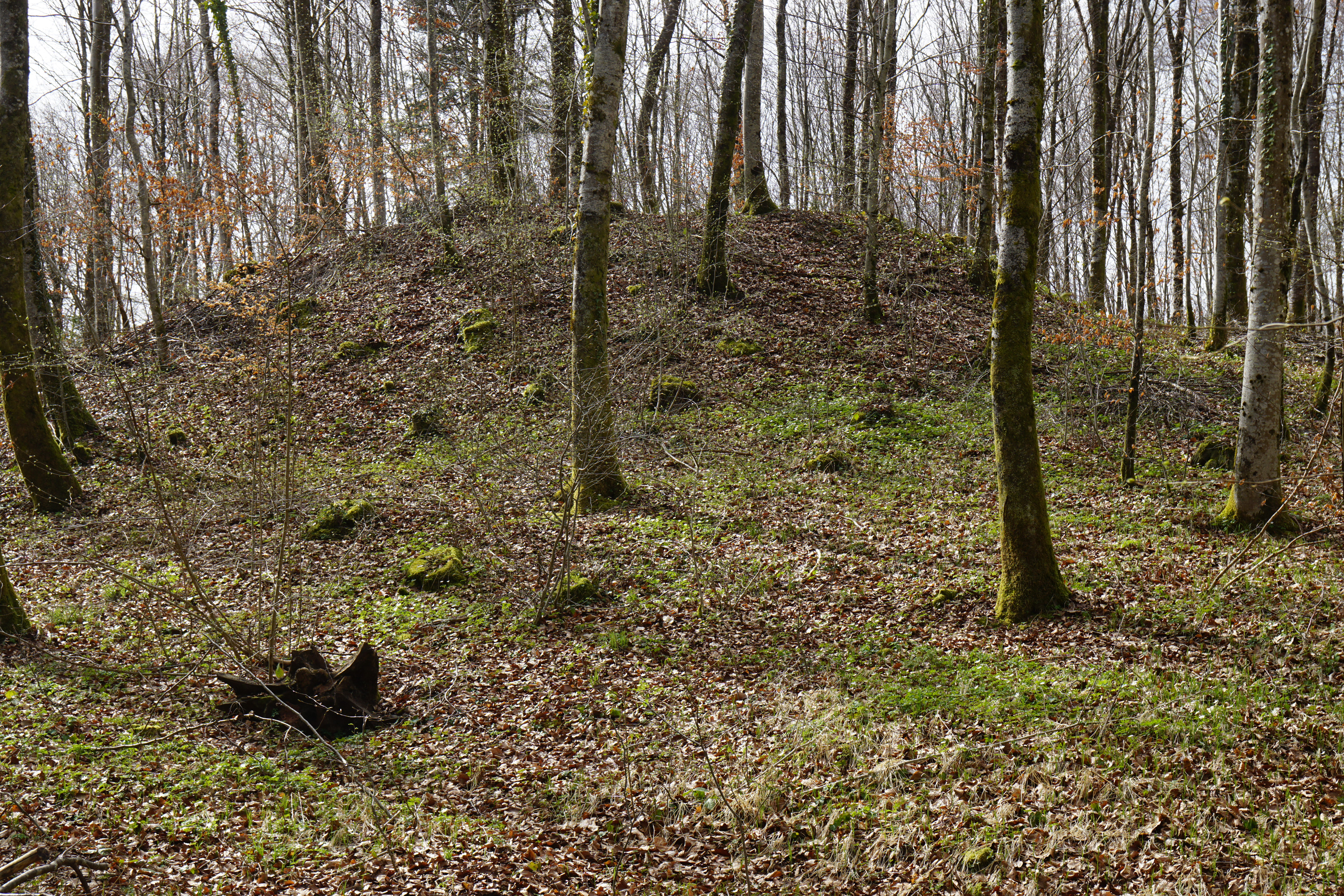
The slag heap at shaft n^{o}. 4

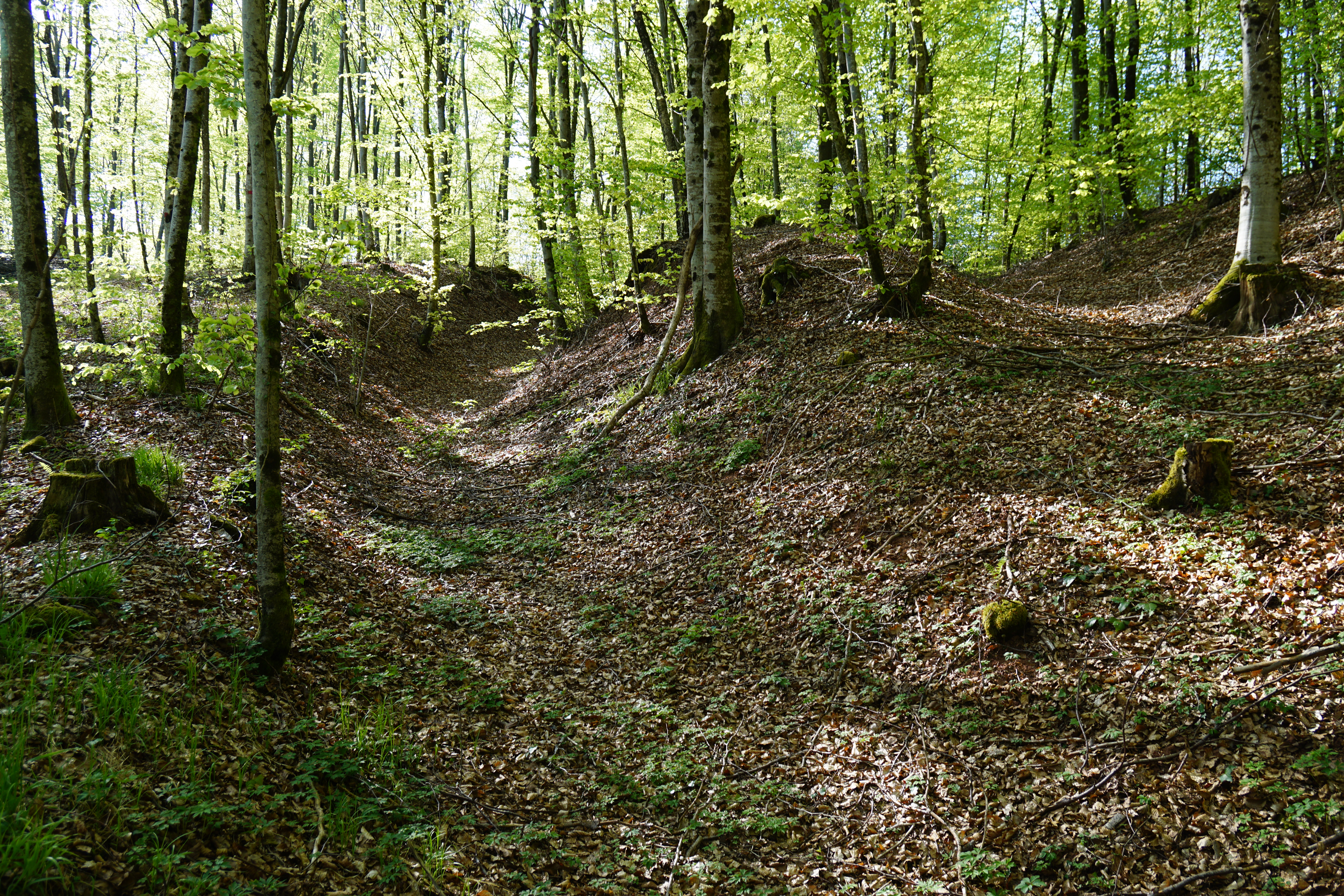
The old track linking Shaft N^{o}. 4 and Shaft N^{o}. 3

== Shaft no. 5 ==
47.700259°N 6.671484°E

Sinking of the shaft began on May 20, 1830, on the advice of Thirria, an engineer from Vesoul, who had planned to sink the shaft 1,200 meters south of shaft n^{o}. 1 (not far from the future Sainte-Pauline and Sainte-Barbe shafts), but the mining company decided to sink it only 800 meters from the latter. The shaft is rectangular in cross-section, measuring 2.75 × 2.26 meters, with three compartments: one for extraction (2.26 × 1.54 meters), one for ladders (2.26 × 0.8 meters) and one for ventilation (2.26 × 0.4 meters). The first casing kit is installed at a depth of nine meters.

In March 1831, the casing was extended to a depth of 31 meters with a spiked casing, and in October the shaft reached a depth of 52 meters. At the end of 1831, the sinking of shaft no. 5 was suspended due to a lack of funding. Sinking was finally resumed in March 1832, only to stop again in May 1832 at a depth of 36.8 meters to drill a hole at the bottom of the shaft, which reached 50 meters on July 5. At 130 meters from the surface, he encountered coal-bearing soil, but no trace of coal. This shallow depth suggested a ground uplift. No coal was extracted, and the shaft was abandoned.

At the beginning of the 21st century, the well is a water hole in the Époisses wood.

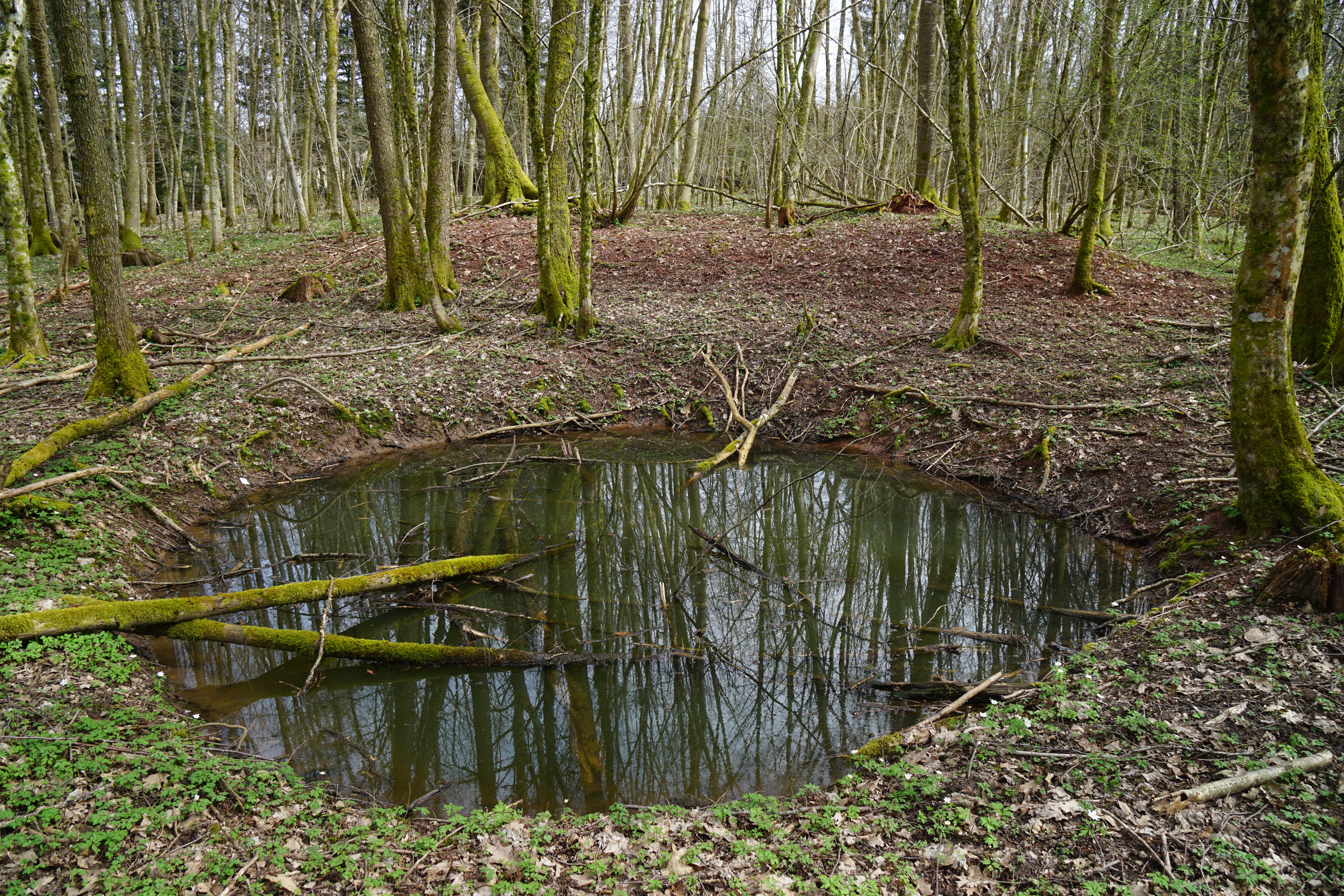
Funnel-shaped hole, remnant of shaft n^{o}. 5

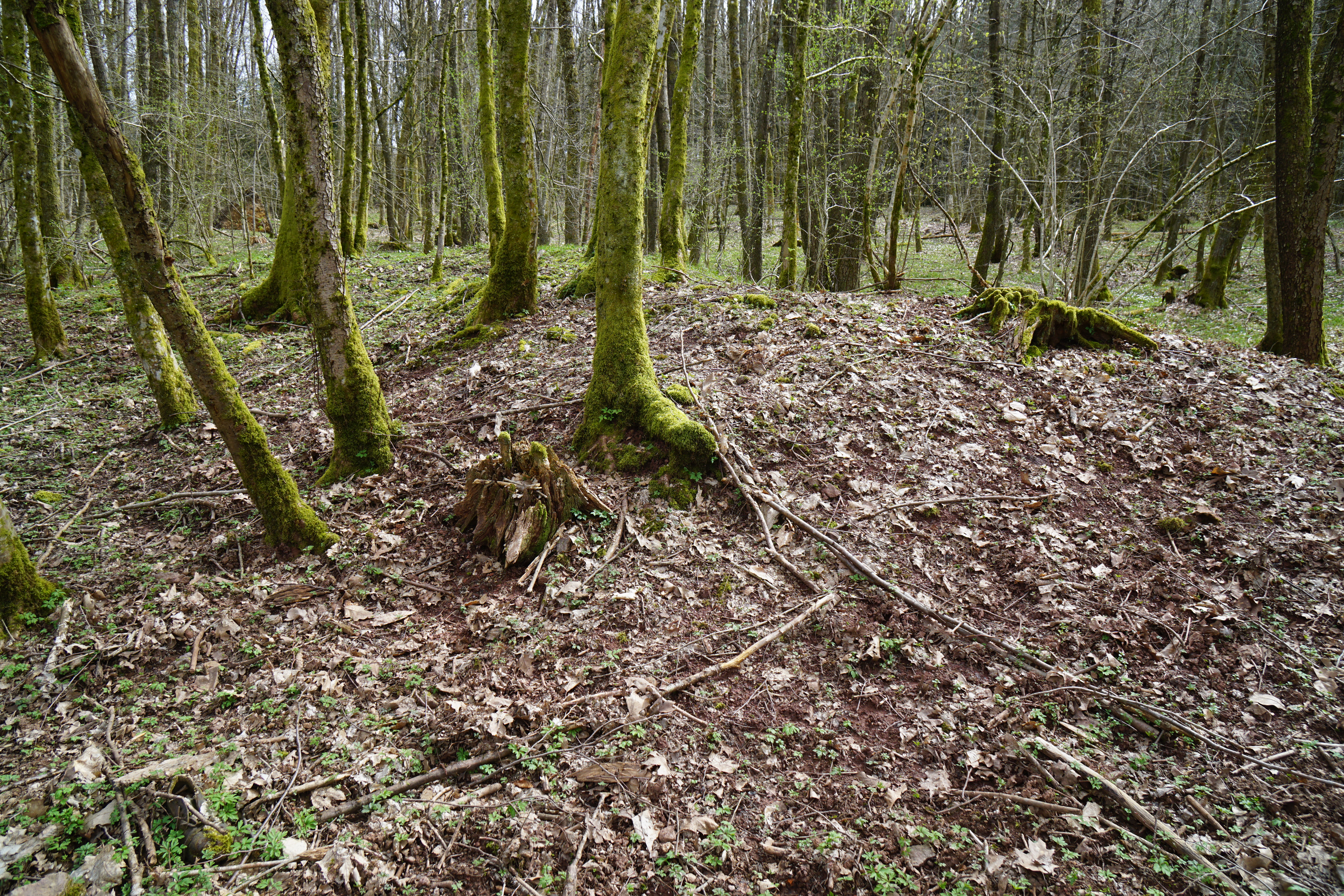
Small slag heap

== Shaft n^{o}. 6 ==
47.707018°N 6.644486°E

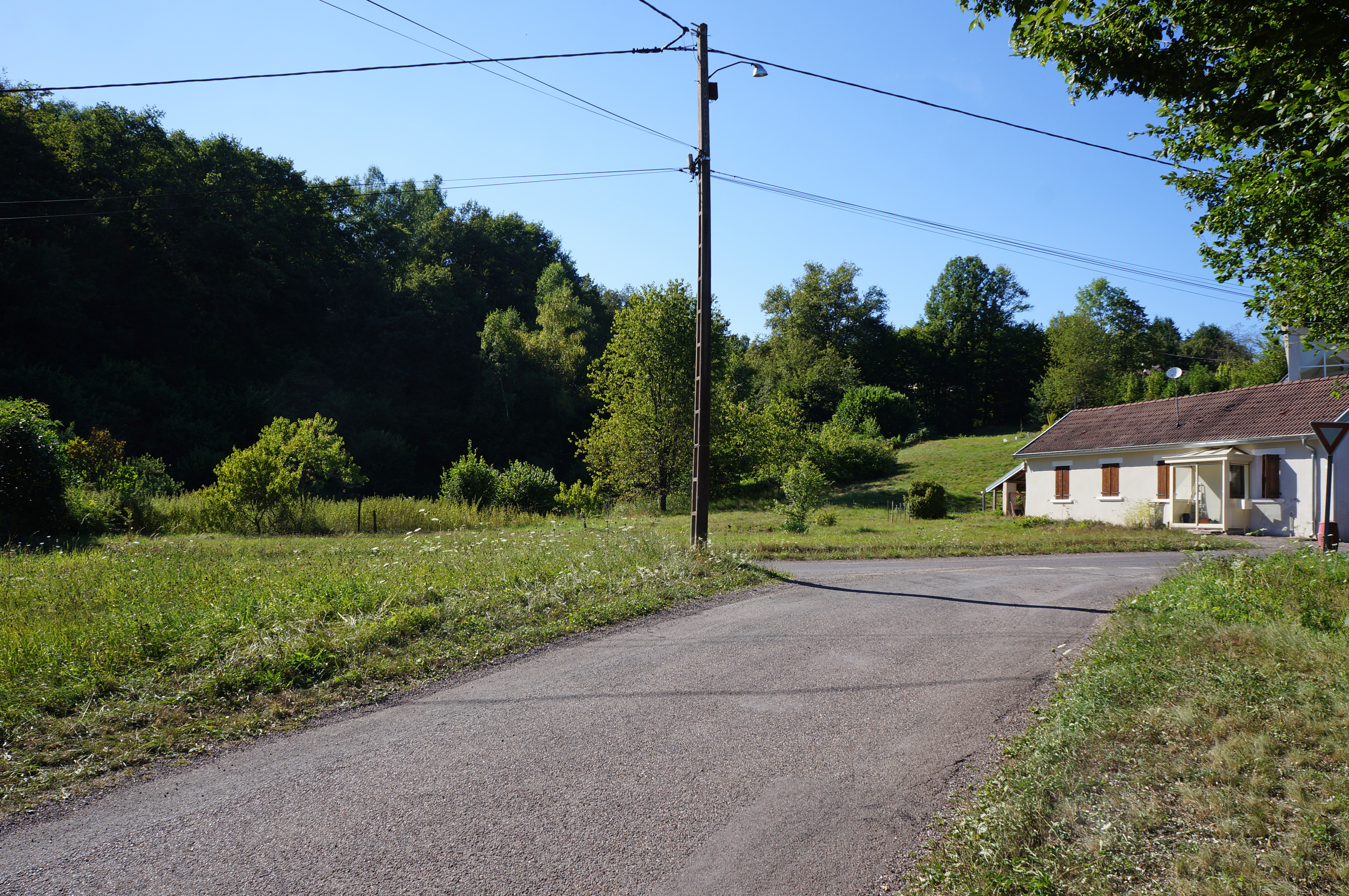
Shaft n^{o}. 6. The building on the right was the janitor's house.

Sinking of the shaft began on August 1, 1832, 190 meters south-west of the Samson shaft, abandoned eight years earlier. The coalfield is encountered at 44 meters and the first layer at 56 meters, which is almost a metre thick, but blocked by shale coal. At 59 meters, a second layer 2.70 meters thick was discovered, but it was cut by a 40-centimeter shale bed. The shaft was stopped at 66 meters from the surface.

The shaft fell at the top of an uplift, as the rocks are highly faulted and the coalfield is 36.9 meters high on the north face of the shaft, compared with 24.9 meters on the south face. A gallery was dug to the west, but the coal is pyritic, so it was abandoned after 250 meters. In April 1834, a hole drilled 35 meters west of the shaft found a third layer, but this was unworkable. In 1836, mining was stopped. In 1839, a communication gallery was established with shaft no. 7, which was equipped with a ventilation shaft from 1847.

In 1840, the shaft was drowned when the concession was abandoned. In 1842, the new owners, who had just acquired the concession, hoped that coal might still exist from the plans and engineer's reports. They decided to dewater the shaft and investigate, but to no avail. Shaft no. 6 was still used as a natural ventilation shaft at Saint-Charles between 1850 and 1855.

At the beginning of the 21st century, the well is located in the garden of a house that once housed the well's caretaker.

== Shaft n^{o}. 7 ==
47.705729°N 6.64406°E

The shaft was sunk on July 15, 1839, 150 meters south of shaft no. 6, with the aim of finding coal beyond the uplift encountered by its predecessor. But on September 25, 1840, work stopped at 94.70 meters in the red sandstone. A 20-meter borehole at the bottom of the shaft still revealed the presence of red sandstone. By the end of July 1841, 115 meters of red sandstone had been traversed, but work was halted when the company was put up for sale.

On June 14, 1842, the concession was bought back, and on July 20, 1842, the company's new engineer, Schutz, encouraged the owners to resume work on the shaft in view of the positive results of the Ronchamp borehole (or borehole X). On September 5, 1842, work resumed at shaft no. 7. Finally, in April 1843, the shaft traversed the coalfield at 150.73 meters, followed by a 1.75-meter layer of coal at 168.68 meters. On June 8, the second layer of coal was encountered. In November 1843, the shaft encountered a 2.80-metre coal seam at a depth of 180 meters. After the installation of the steam engine in the Saint-Louis shaft, mining finally began. There were 347 workers in 1847.

In 1848, a junction with the Saint-Charles shaft was established, and ventilation took place naturally, but in 1853 it had to be reinforced with a toc-feu. Mining was subsequently abandoned, but the shaft continued to be maintained, becoming the ventilation shaft for the Saint-Charles shaft in 1854. On December 15, 1858, a Lemielle ventilator with a 2.36-meter-diameter hexagonal casing and rotating blades was installed to improve ventilation. It is capable of drawing in 15 m^{3} of air per second, with a rotation speed of 28 revolutions per minute, powered by a 15-horsepower steam engine. It creates three different air currents for better ventilation of the mine workings. The fan was repaired and refurbished in 1863. In 1872, the shaft was closed due to a collapse of the walls, so it was backfilled and the fan was scrapped. In 1958, a concrete slab was poured at the level of its opening.

At the beginning of the 21st century, the secured well was located between two houses in rue du puits VII.

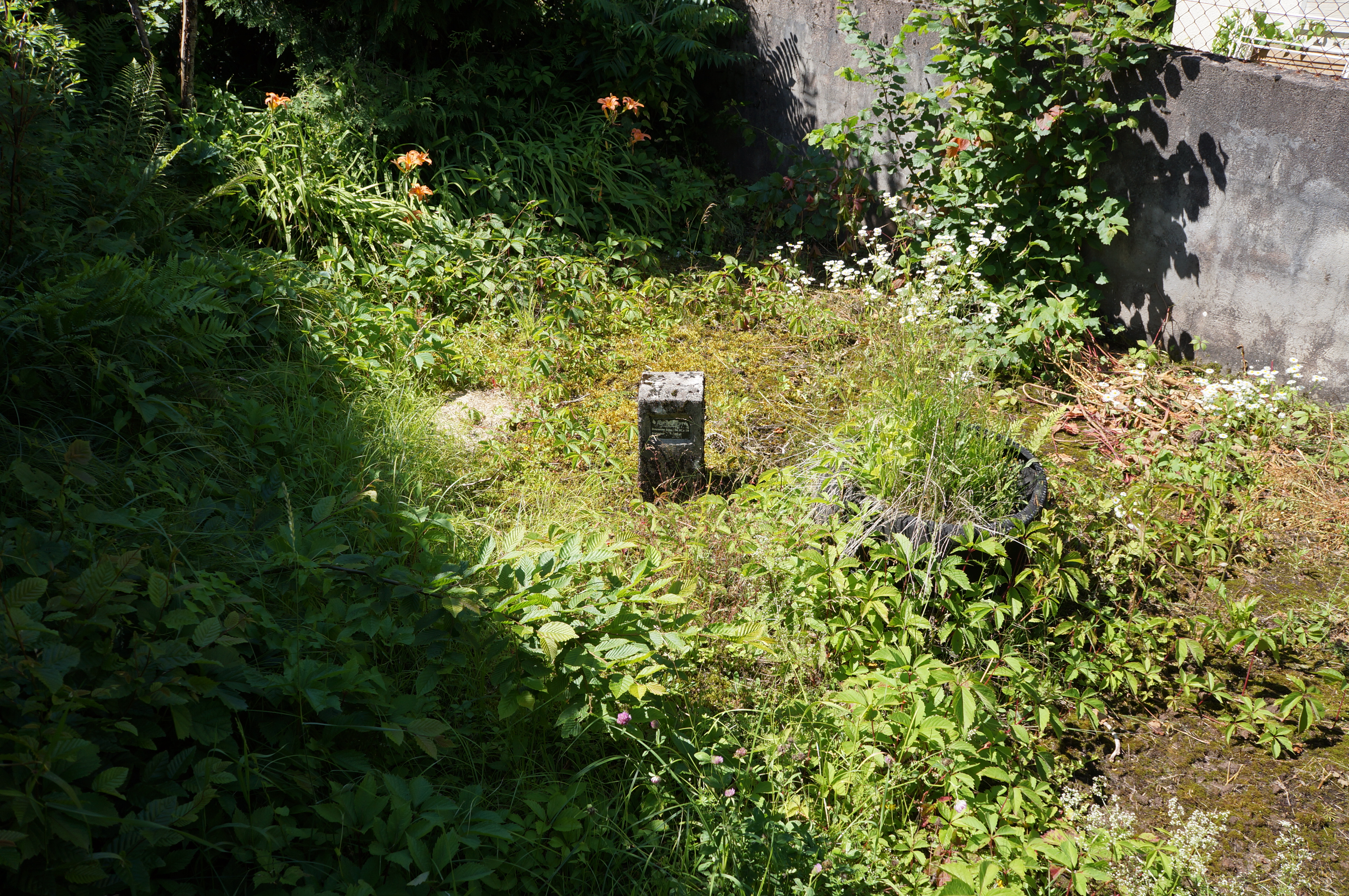
The slab of shaft n^{o}. 7.

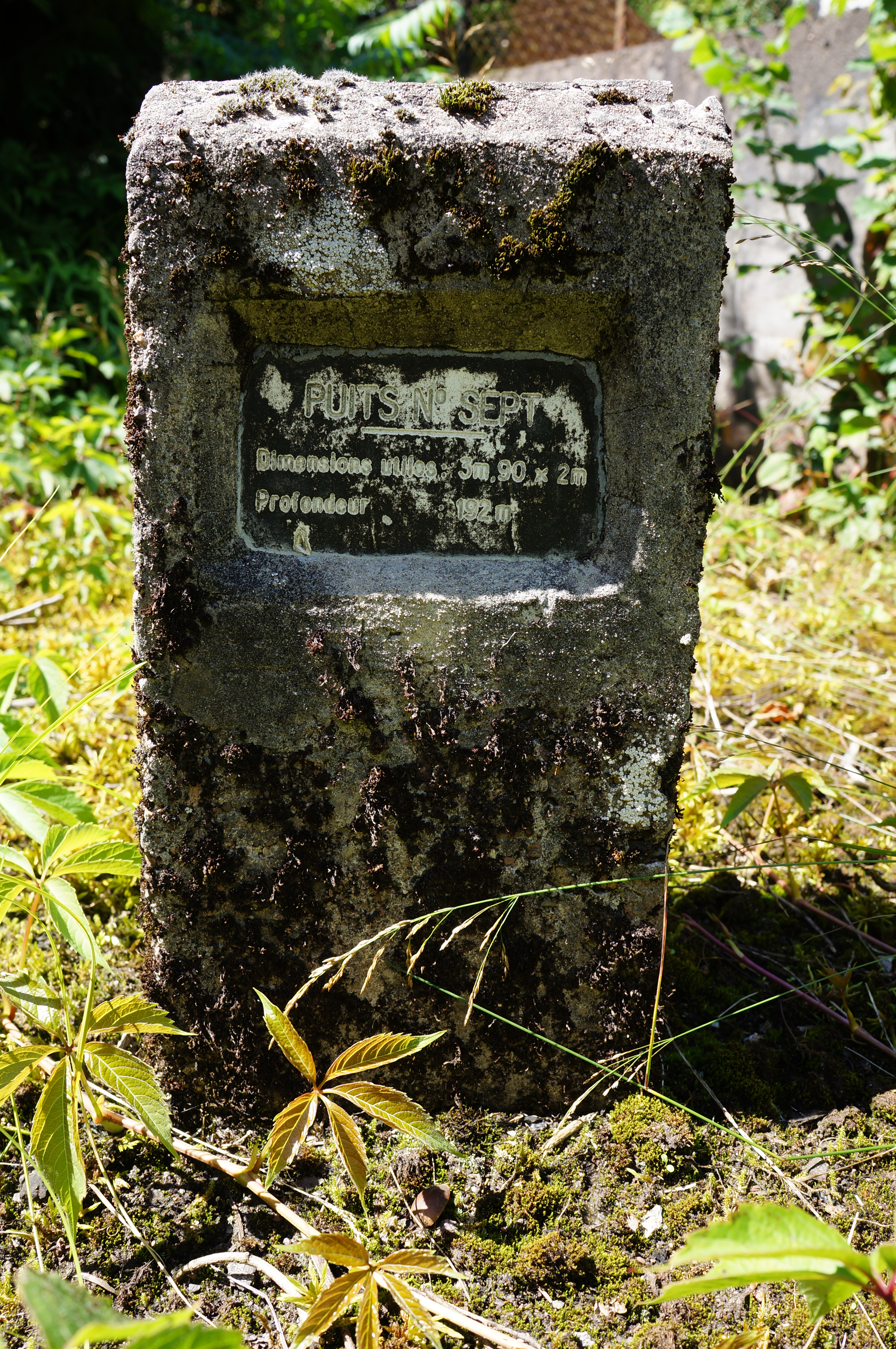
The milestone.

== Saint-Charles shaft n^{o}. 8 ==
47.702928°N 6.648911°E

In the second half of the 19th century, the Saint-Charles shaft was open for more than fifty years, longer than most of the other open pits in Ronchamp. It has also experienced fires and firedamp blasts. The shaft is distinguished by its extraction system using a cleat machine. This process, too complex, was eventually abandoned following technical setbacks. After closure, the pit buildings were converted into housing; the slag heaps were even re-used between the wars, as they were still rich in coal. At the end of the twentieth century, these same slag heaps burst into flames.

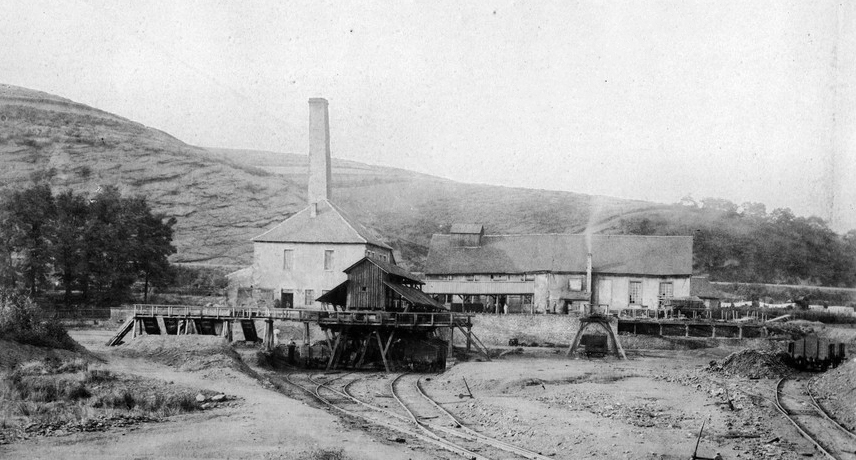
The tile floor of the Saint-Charles well in operation

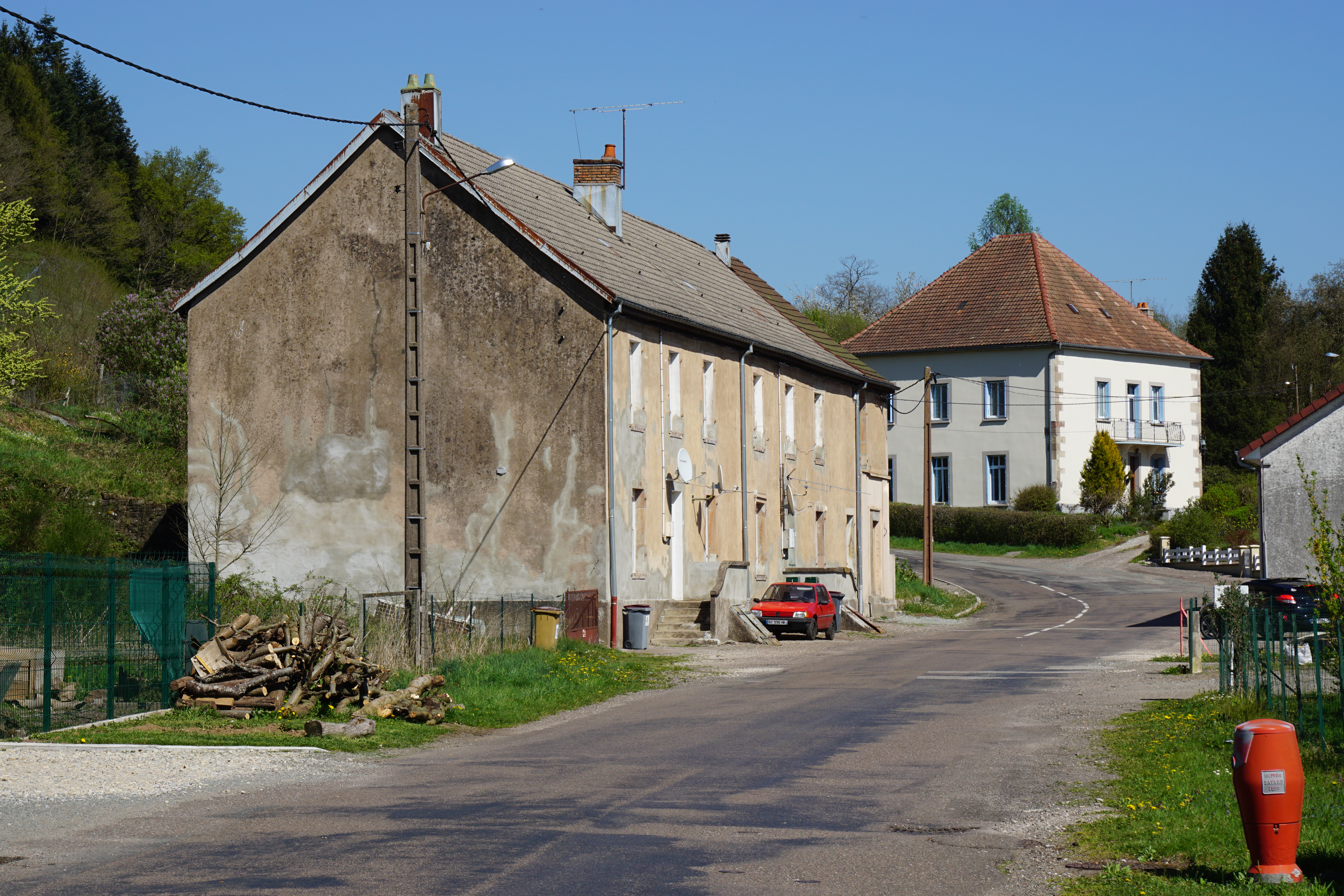
The Saint-Charles shaft floor in 2015

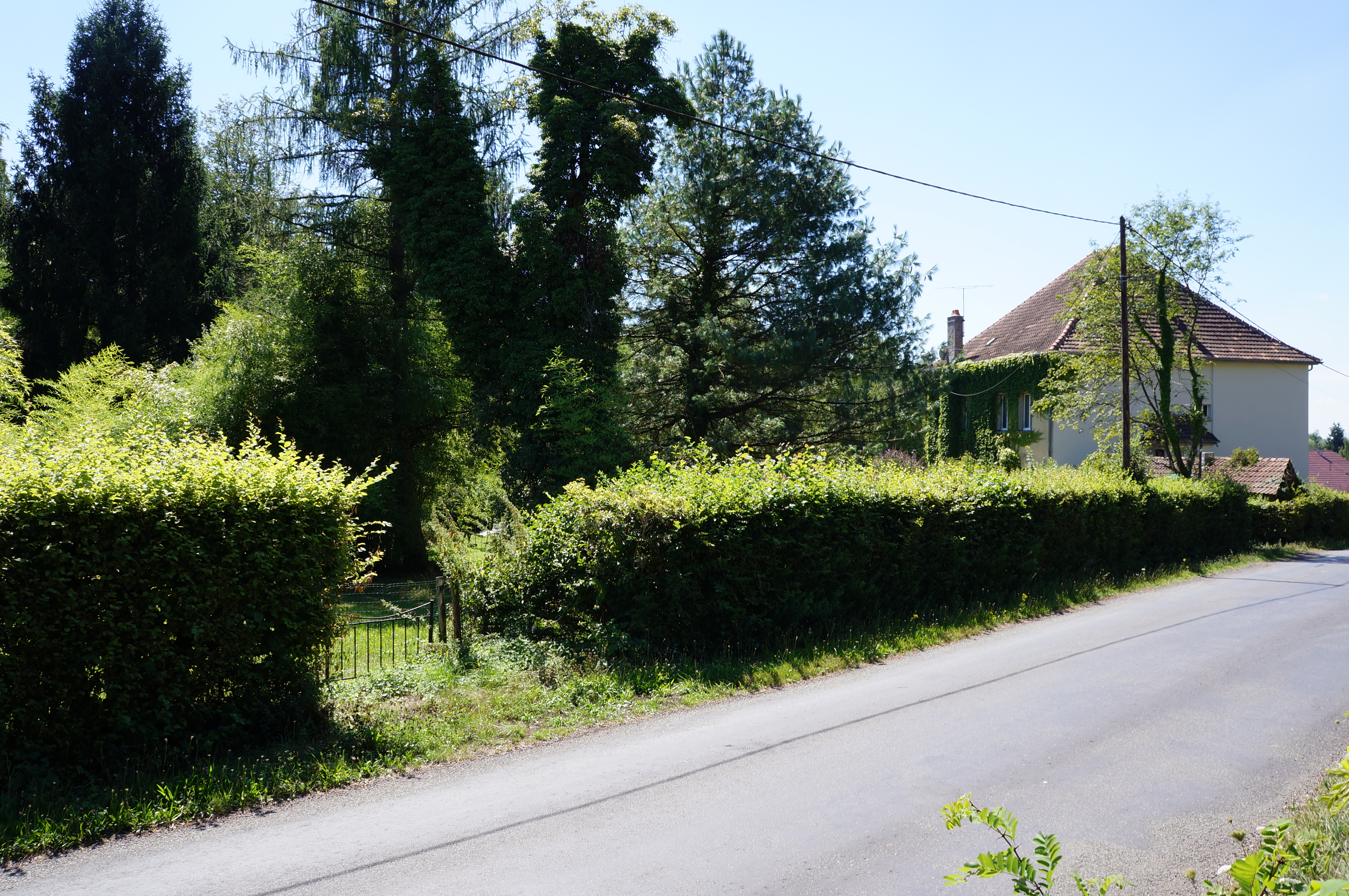
The Saint-Charles well is located in this garden, and the building on the right used to be the engine room.

== de-la-Croix shaft ==
47.719507°N 6.604159°E

This rectangular shaft was commissioned by the Mourière company on October 23, 1849. It was dug using a manual lathe driven by three workers, working day and night. Gunpowder was used for the first time on November 14, 1849. On the following August 24, the company decided to replace the lathe with a baritel. After traversing 25 meters of sandstone, the shaft reaches the coalfield containing pyritic shale. The shaft encounters coal veinlets at depths of 40 and 50 meters. The first mineable coal seam is encountered at 87 meters, 2.2 meters thick but interspersed with shale and pyrite. At 98.5 meters, another layer 0.8 meters thick was discovered. The shaft is then connected to the culotte gallery, which mines the same vein.

On January 7, 1851, the well was flooded by 1,500 liters of water per hour. The Saint-Louis gallery was undertaken to dewater it but failed. Despite this, the sinking was completed on July 14. The shaft is connected to the Culot gallery by a large ascending gallery. Two layers of coal a few tens of centimeters thick are mined with a 15 hp steam engine. The coal had to be washed, as it contained iron pyrite and clay. Work was suspended seven years later following the accidental death of the mining engineer. In 1872, a new company was created and work resumed. Coal production fell from 1,001 tonnes in 1879 to 588 tonnes in 1880. In 1891, the winding-up of the company put an end to operations at the de-la-Croix shaft.

At the beginning of the 21st century, a five-meter-diameter funnel remains, regularly filled with water.

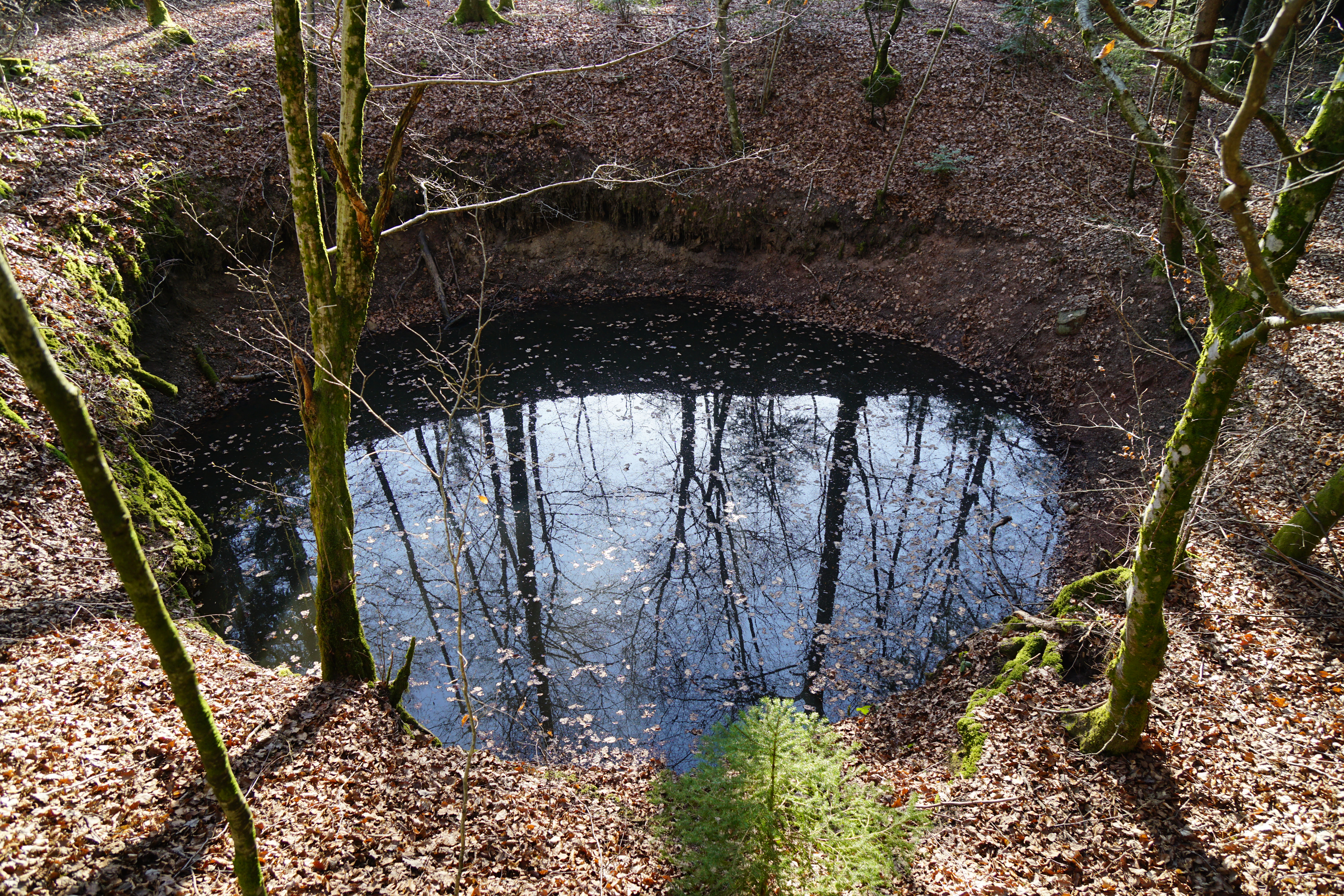
Drowned funnel-shaped hole, remnant of the de-la-Croix shaft

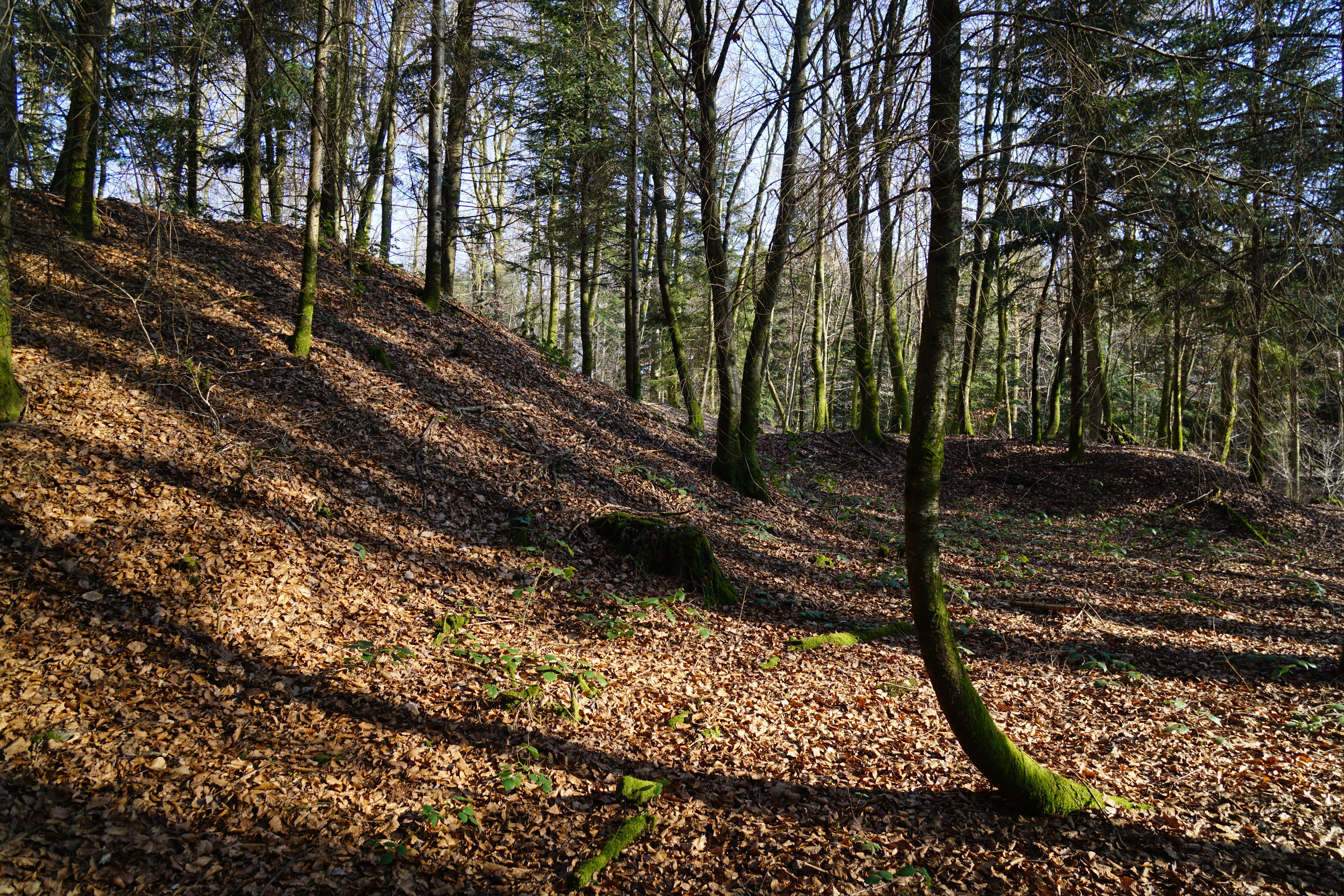
The slag heap

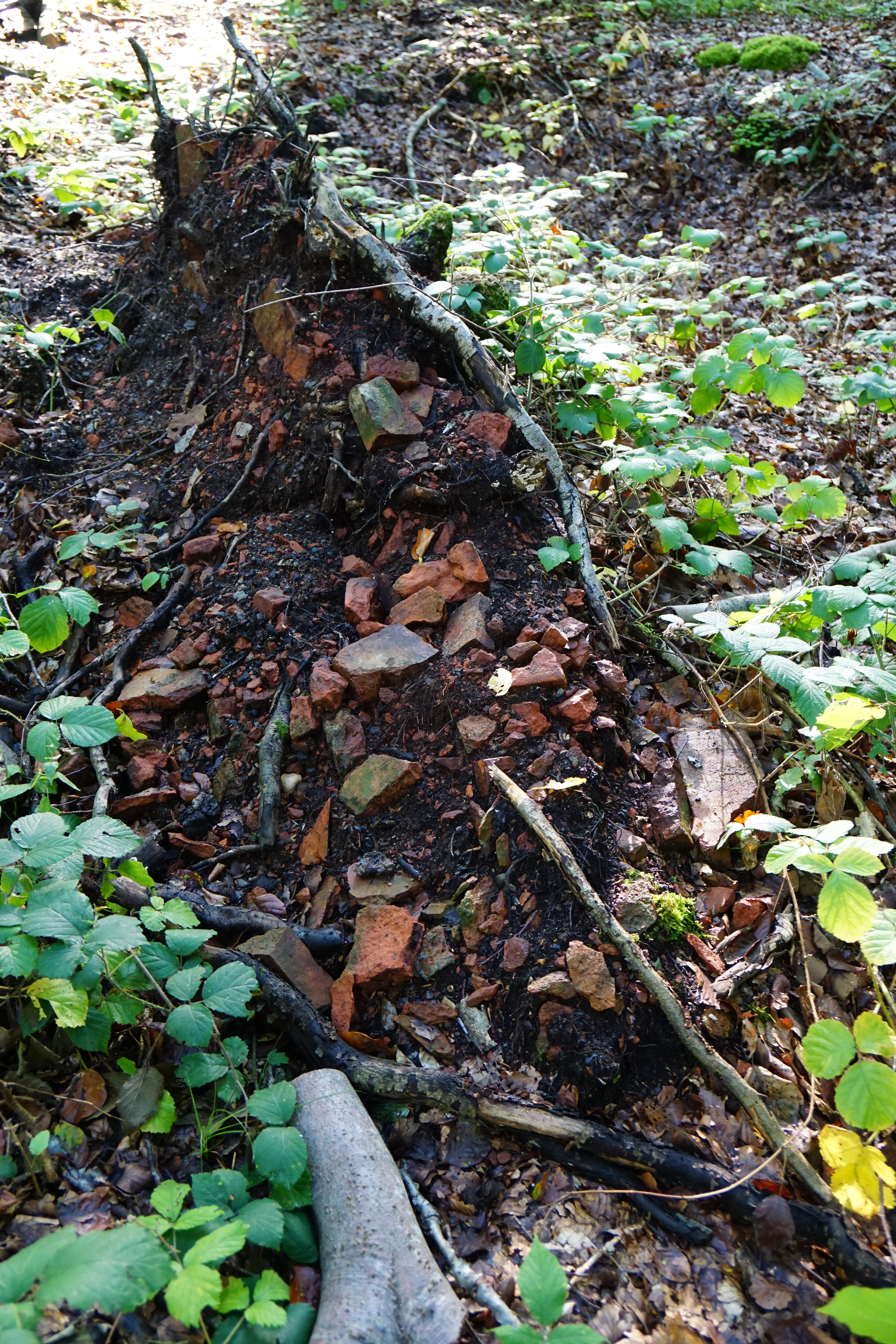
Bricks

== Saint-Joseph shaft ==
47.696834°N 6.647587°E

The Saint Joseph pit was the center of activity for the Ronchamp company, with the installation of a coking plant and a coal-washing plant, before being replaced by the Chanois shaft. On August 10, 1859, a firedamp explosion killed 29 people. On May 8, 1860, another explosion destroyed the underground galleries and the roof of the surface revenue building. After the closure of the Saint-Joseph shaft in 1895, the buildings were razed to the ground and replaced by a small sawmill, whose buildings, now used as warehouses for building materials, still exist at the beginning of the 21st century.

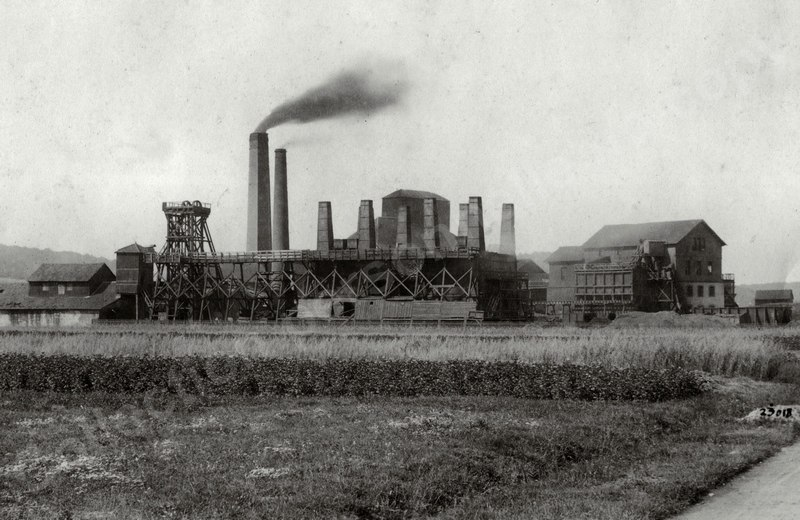
The coking plant at the Saint-Joseph well (Appolt furnaces)

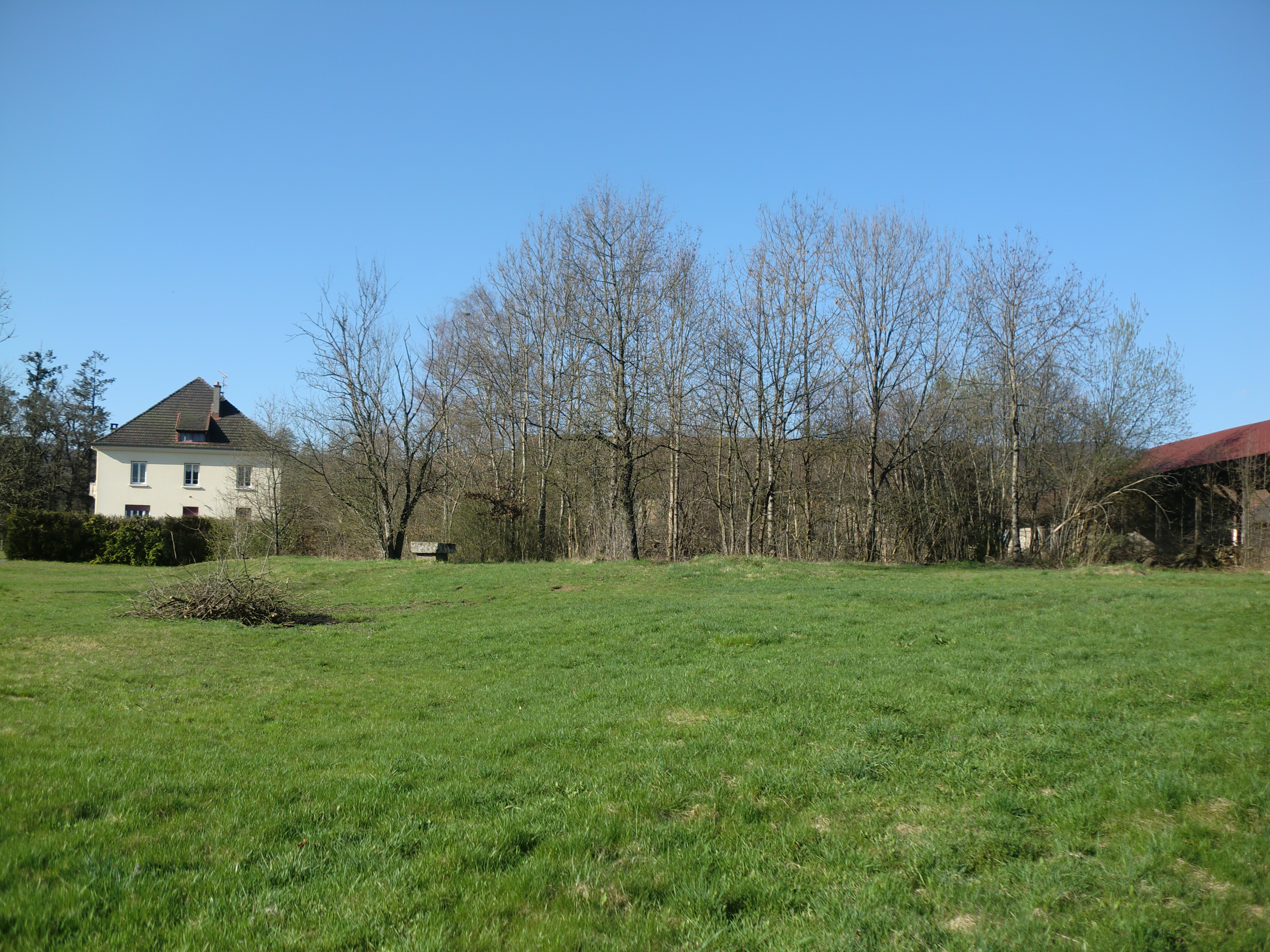
The Saint Joseph well is located behind the trees beneath the building.

== Notre-Dame Shaft ==
47.690047°N 6.648059°E

The Notre-Dame shaft was dug by a rival company, the Société des maîtres de forges owning the Éboulet mines, from 1851 before being integrated into the Ronchamp collieries fifteen years later. After being used to extract coal for half a century, it was then used as a water pumping shaft until the mines closed in 1958. The concrete slabs obstructing the shafts still stand at the beginning of the 21st century.

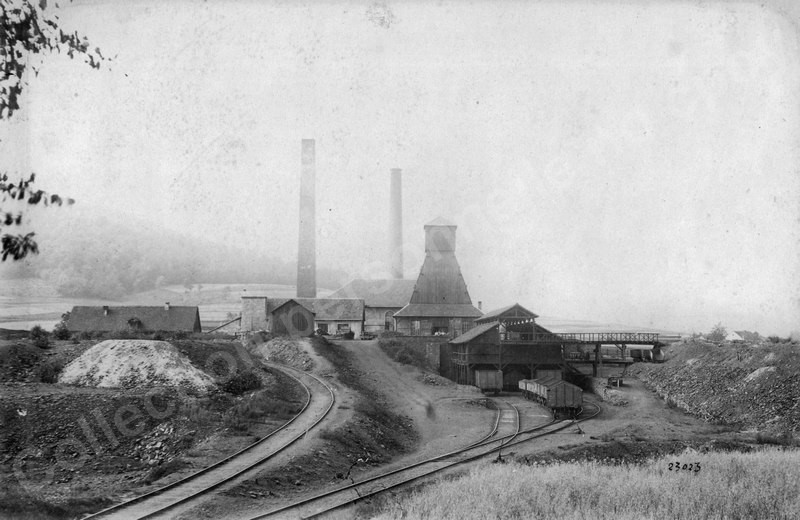
The Notre-Dame well in operation.

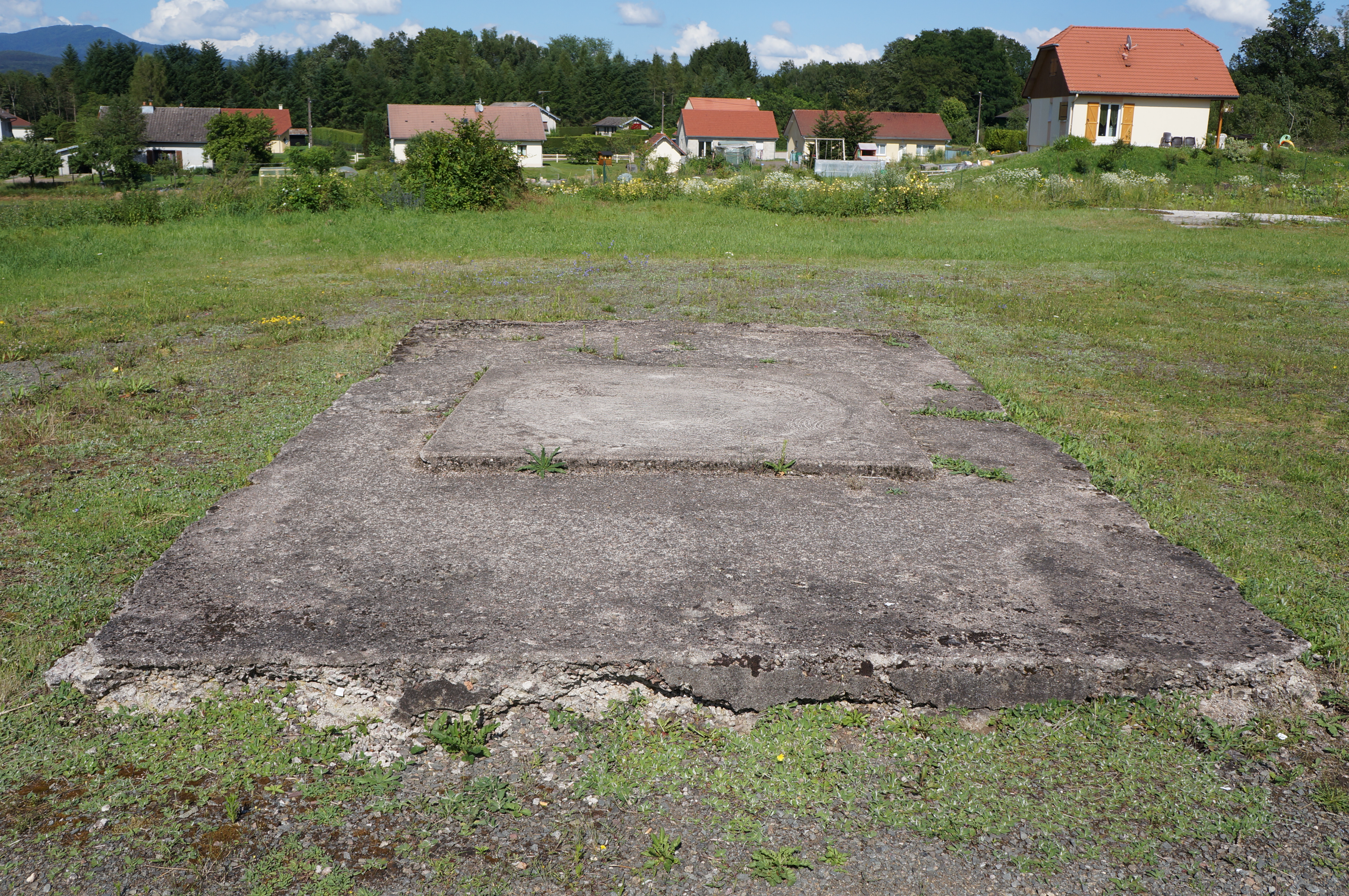
The extraction shaft slab.

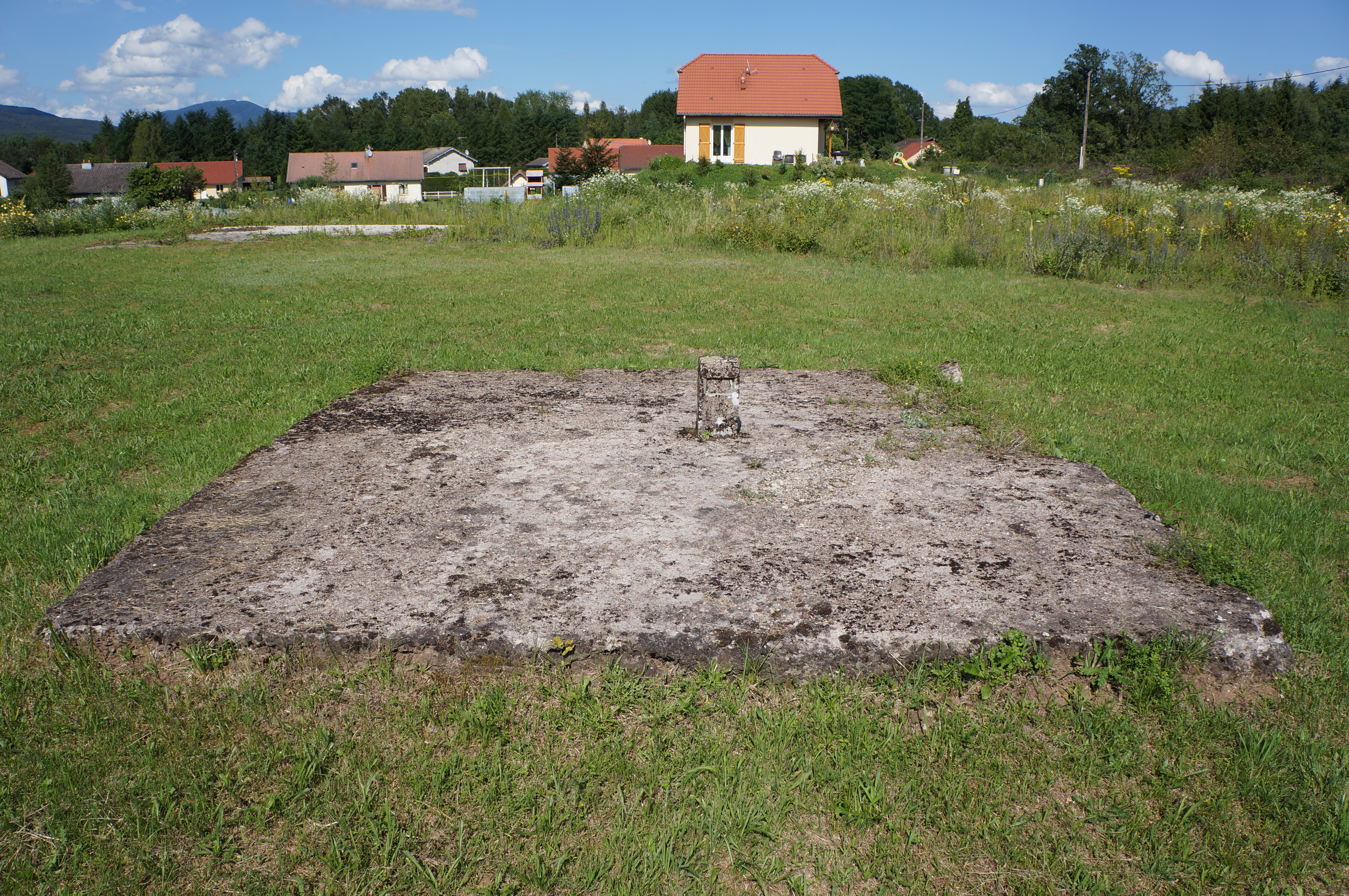
The air shaft slab.

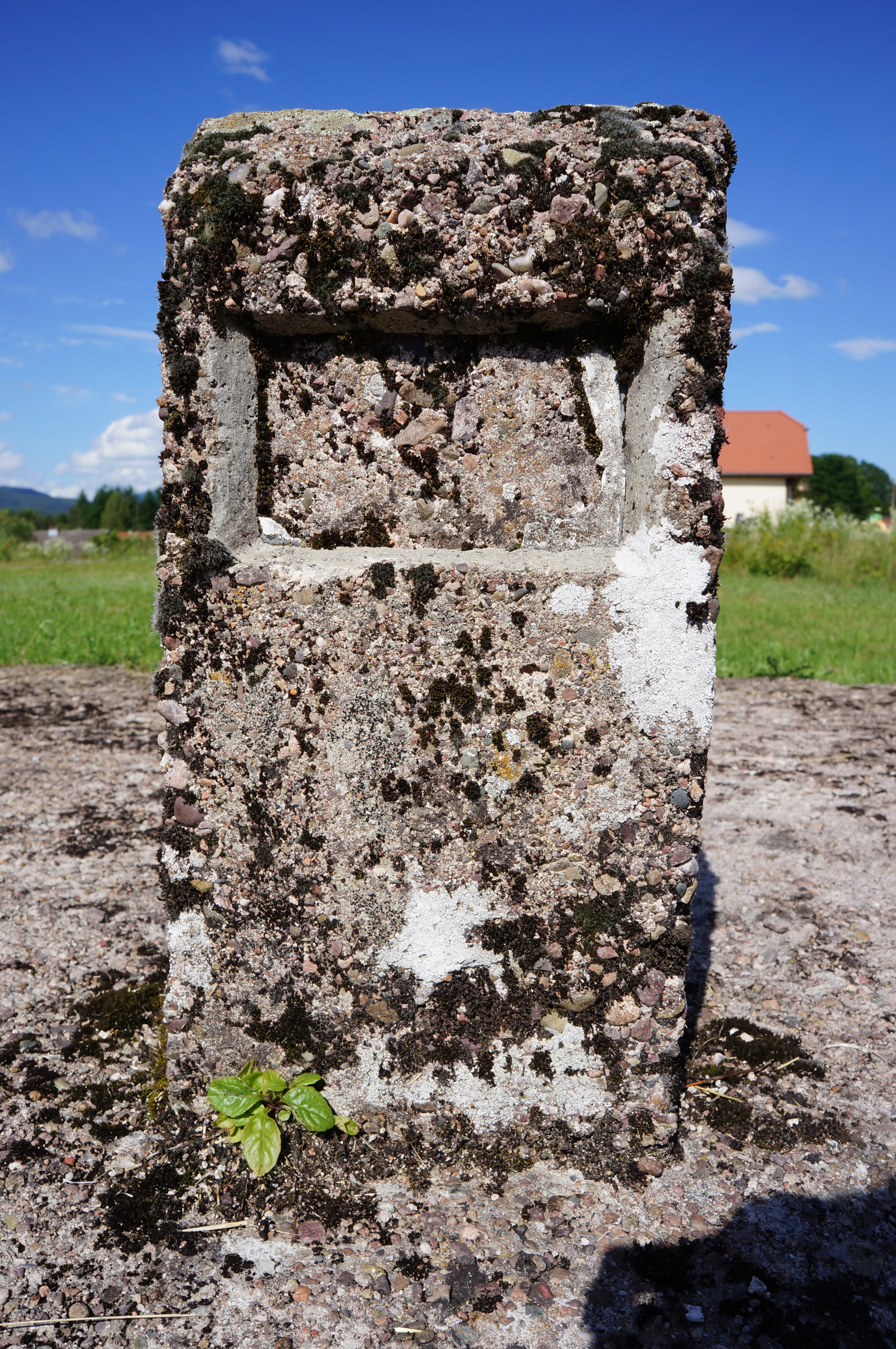
Its milestone.

== Saint-Jean shaft ==
47.694187°N 6.669999°E

Sinking of the shaft began on May 21, 1854. Rectangular in cross-section, measuring 5 by 2.50 meters, it was cased for 34.11 meters, but the casing allowed some of the water to pass through; it was then extended to the bottom at 51.4 meters. Water flow is 800 liters per hour. Specific machines were used to drain it. On January 9, 1856, the well was abandoned due to its exorbitant cost of 168,719.12 francs and because it duplicated the Sainte-Pauline well. In 1867, five houses were built near the well. The well was finally backfilled on February 8, 1873. At the beginning of the 21st century, the well was located in a garden in the cité Saint-Jean.

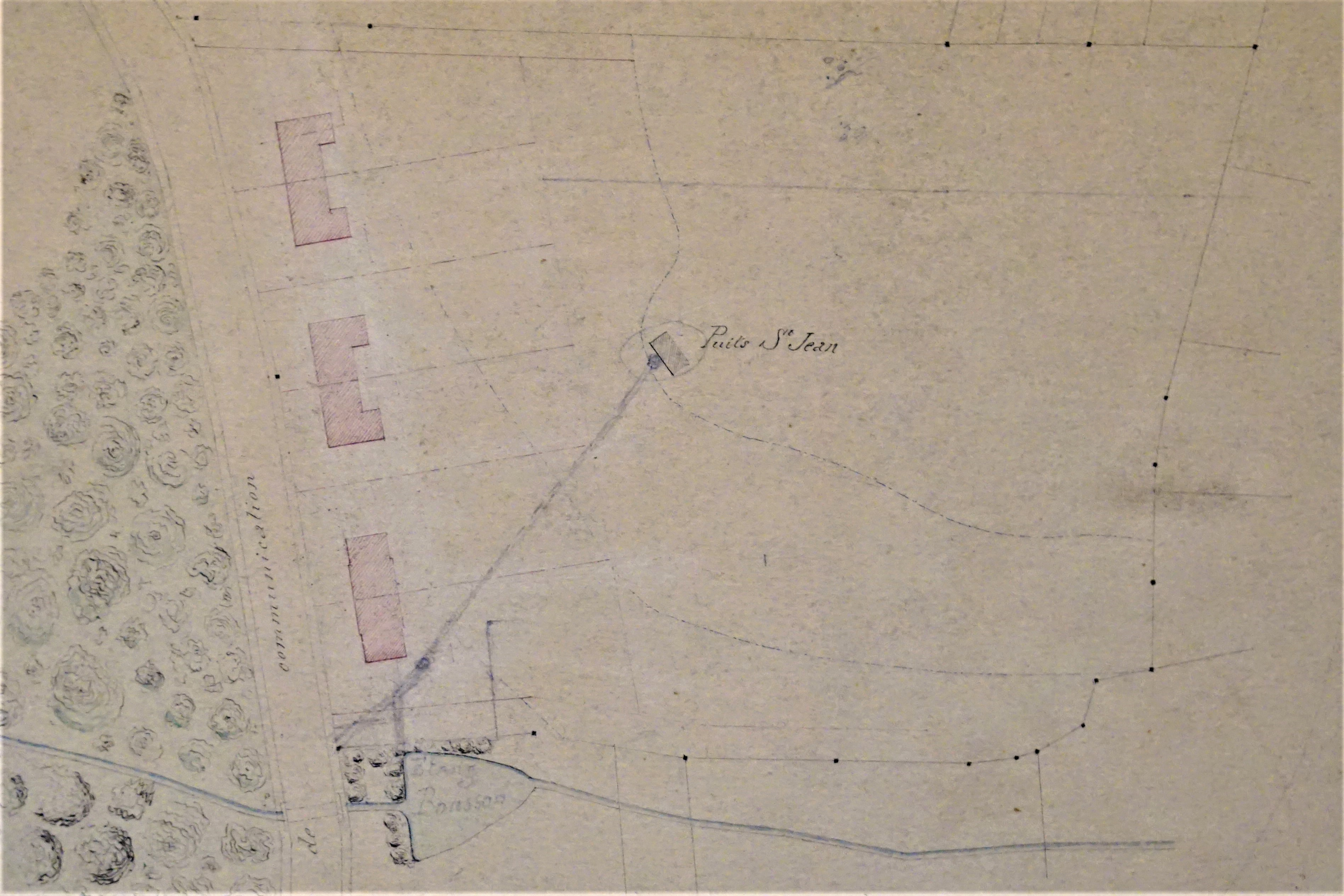
Site plan of the Saint-Jean well and its housing estate

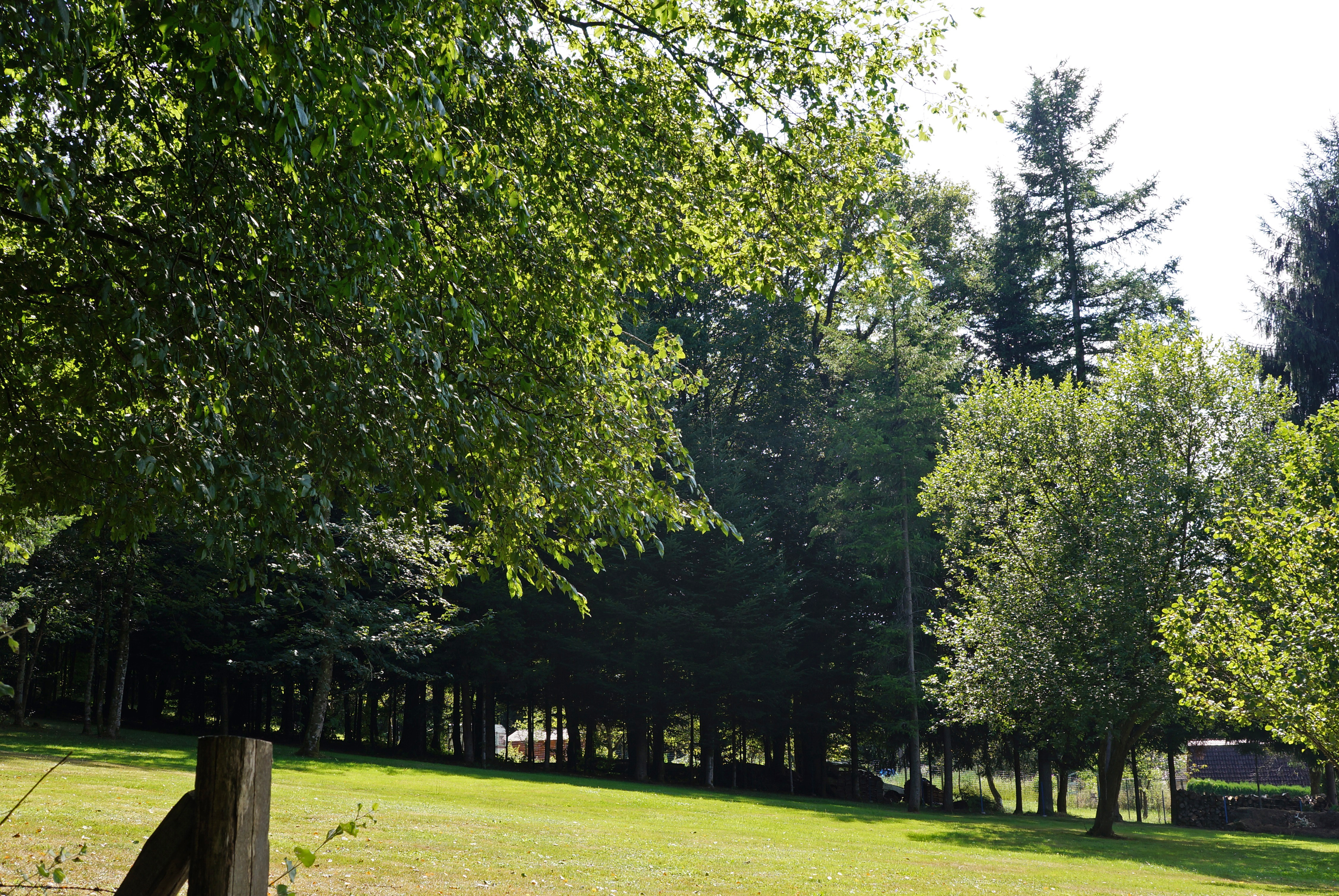
The Saint-Jean well is located in this garden.

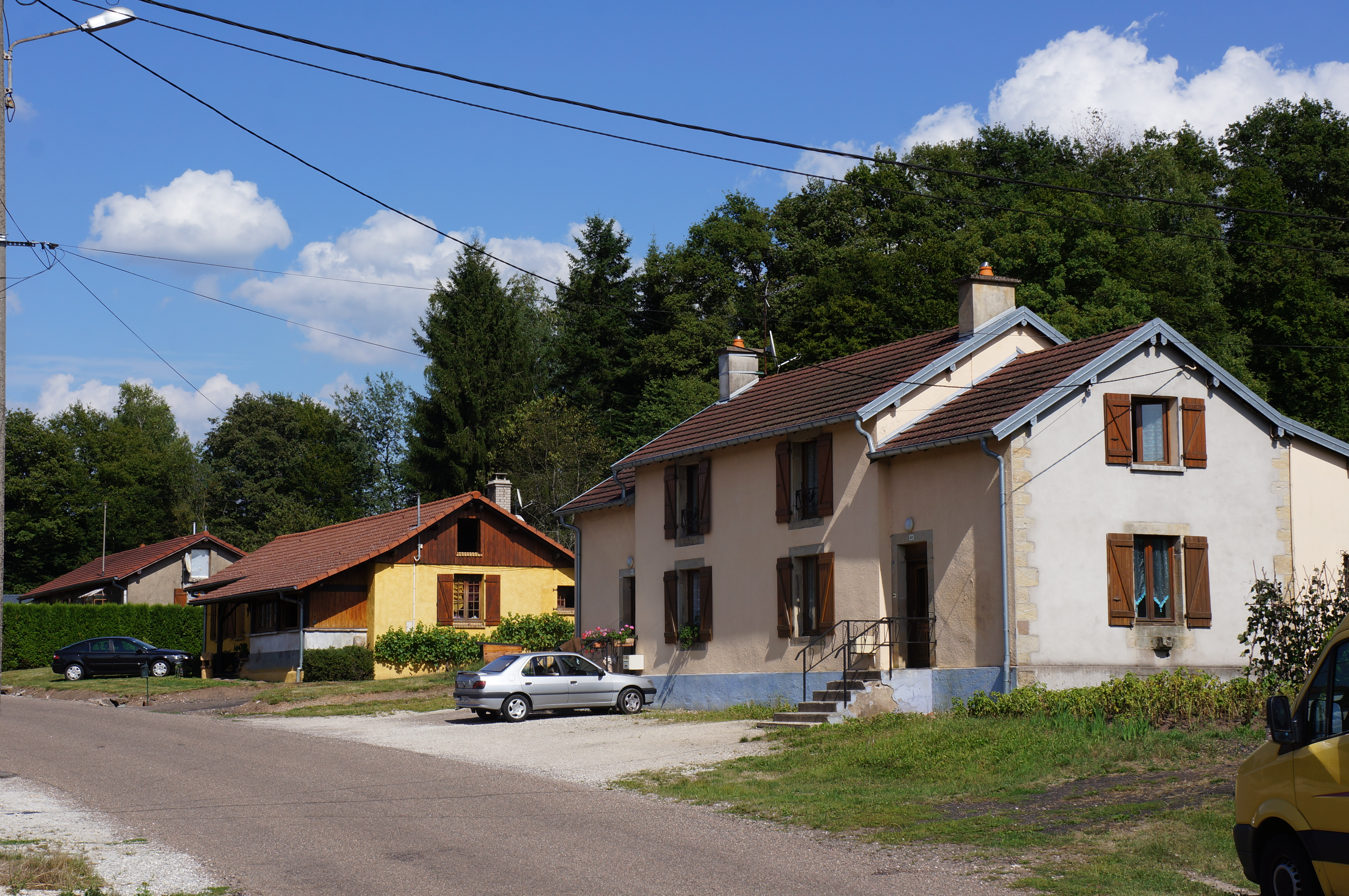
La cité Saint-Jean

== Sainte-Pauline shaft ==
47.692949°N 6.660563°E

The shaft was sunk from 1854 onwards, and coal was mined between 1861 and 1884, before the pit was backfilled. In the 1870s, a mining town, a phalanstery and a Catholic chapel were built in the immediate vicinity of the mine. At the beginning of the 21st century, the shaft was a funnel just a few meters from Route Nationale. The mining settlement, the phalanstery and the slag heap (where a horse riding arena is located) also survive.

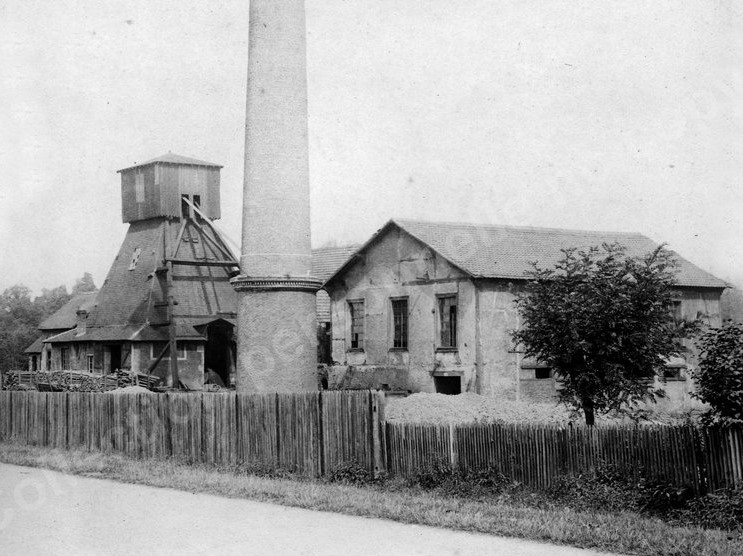
The well before it closed.

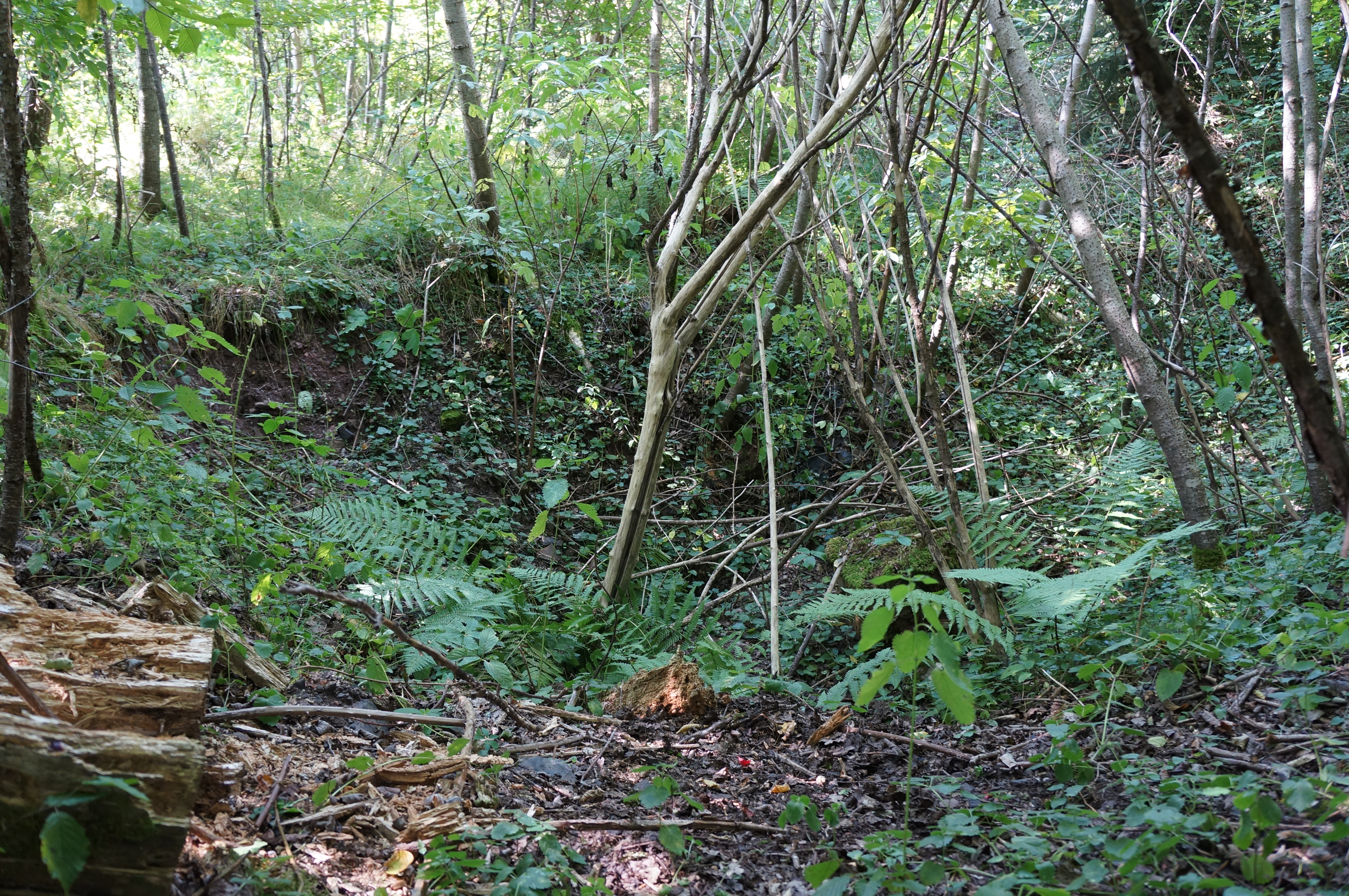
Funnel marking the location of the well.

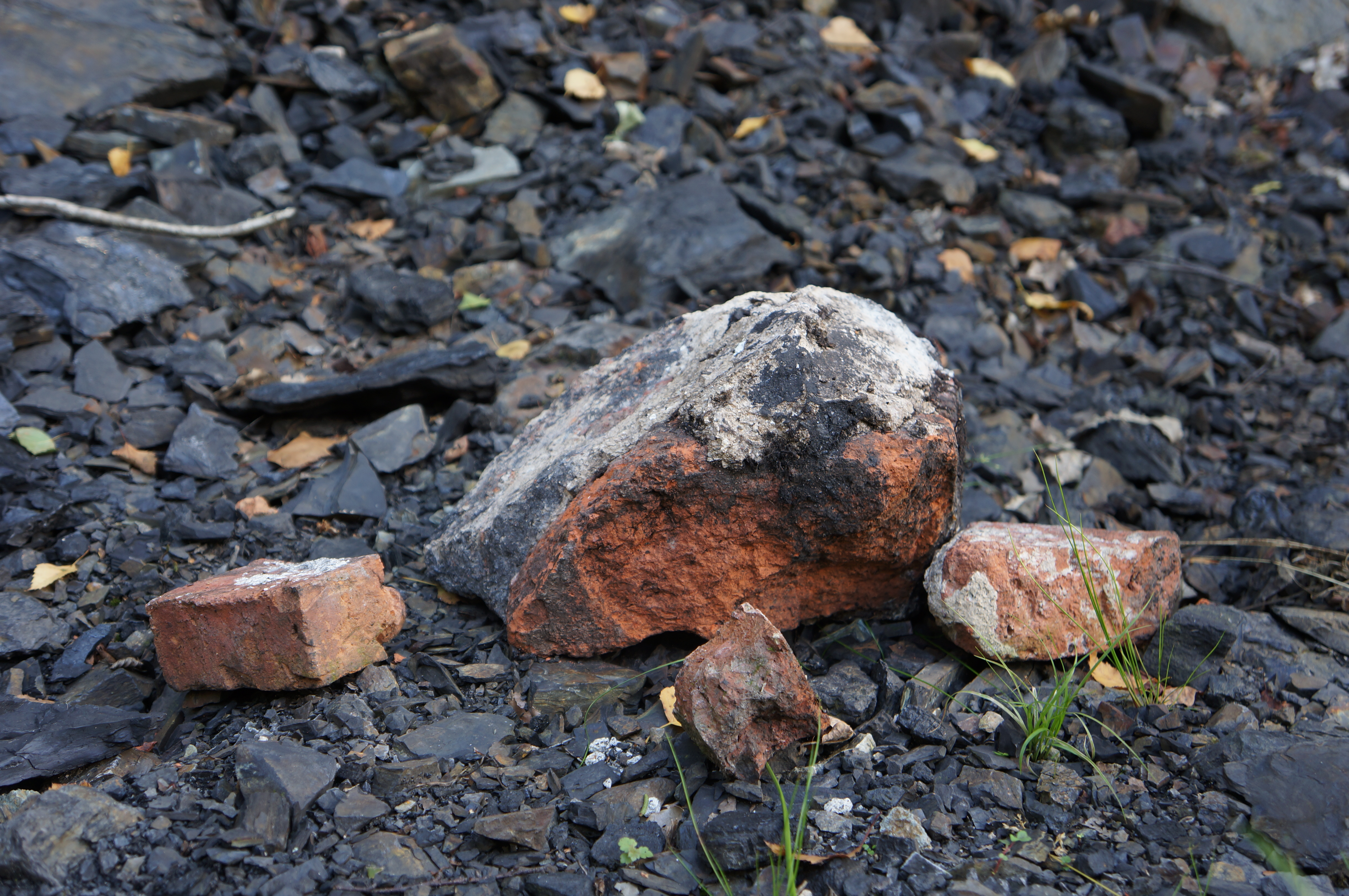
Old bricks from surface buildings.

== Sainte-Barbe shaft ==
47.698208°N 6.658240°E

The Sainte-Barbe shaft is located near the Champagney ballastières. Sunk from 1854, it mined coal from 1860 to 1872 and was used to ventilate the Sainte-Pauline shaft from 1869 to 1884, before being backfilled. In the second half of the 20th century, the well site was used as a sand pit, and a short-lived equestrian center existed at the beginning of the 21st century. A sign installed in 2017 explains the history of the Sainte-Pauline and Sainte-Barbe wells.

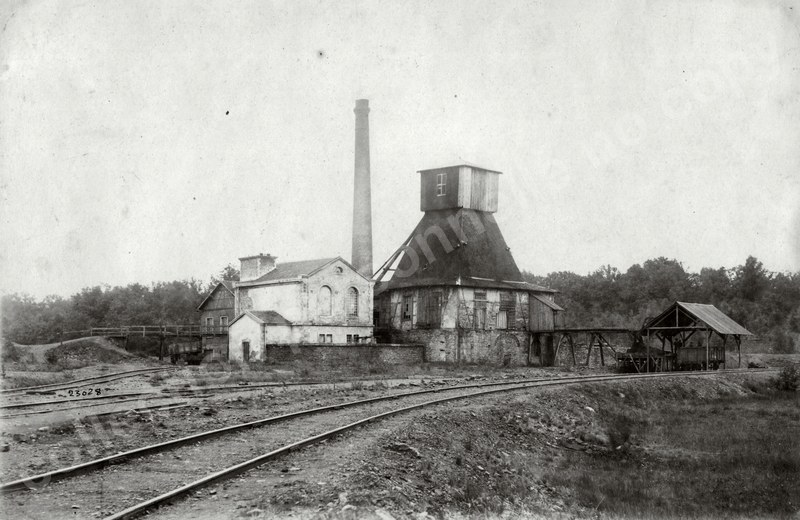
The Sainte-Barbe shaft surface installation

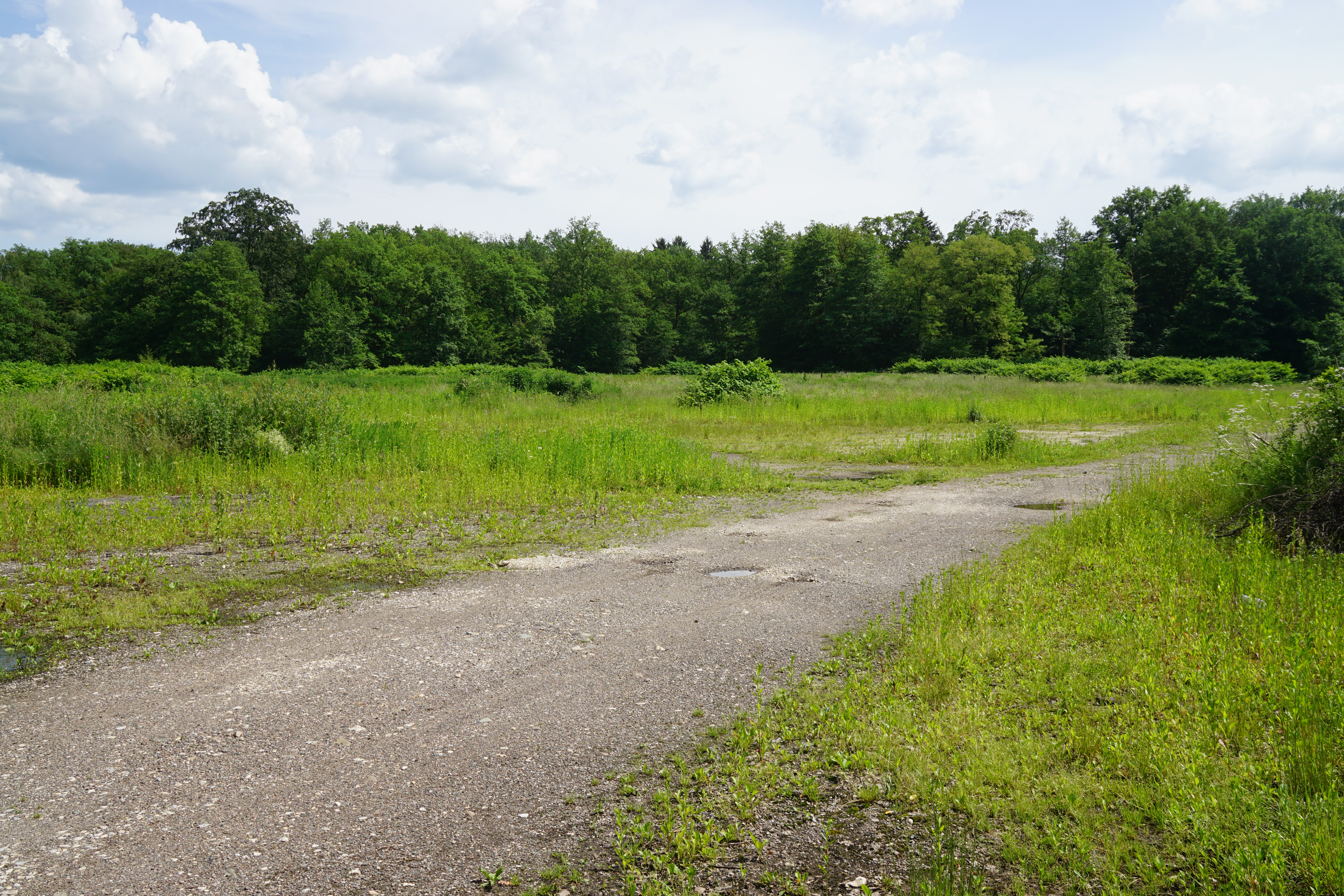
General view of the well site

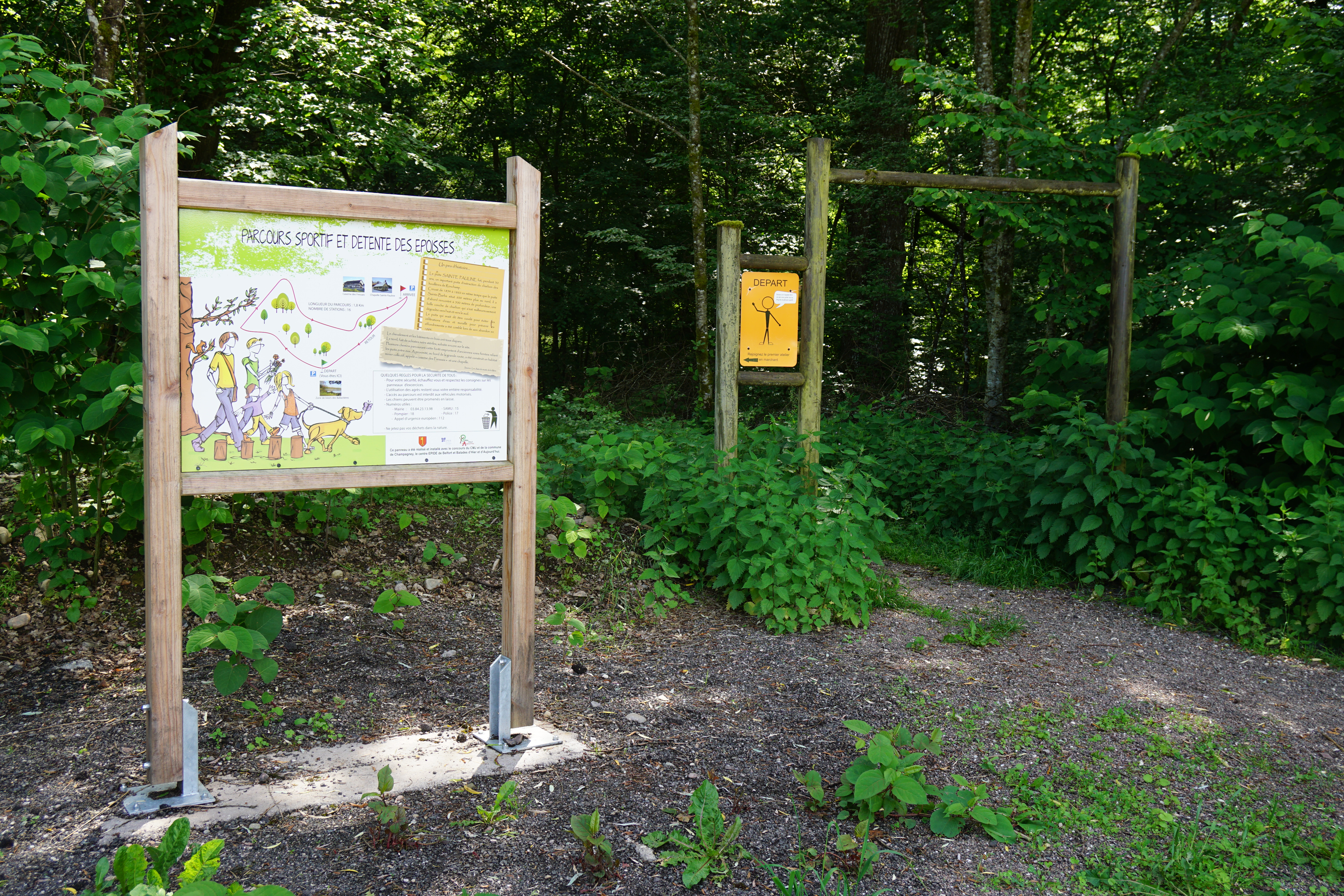
The shaft sign at the entrance to the fitness trail

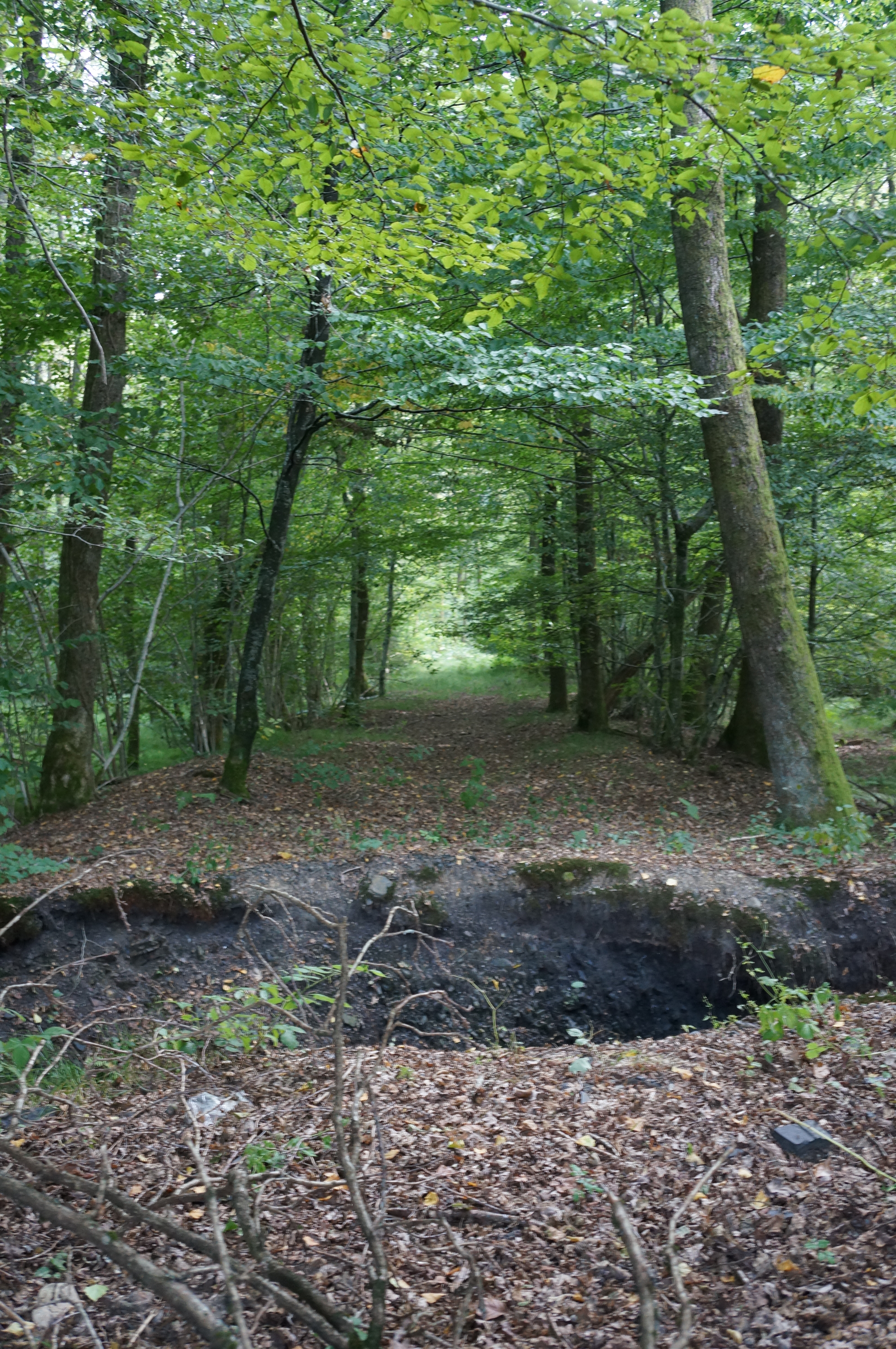
Old railroad

== l'Espérance shaft ==
47.688698°N 6.657640°E

The shaft was sunk on December 16, 1855, against a backdrop of competition for a concession extension. As the competing Éboulet company had already obtained the land sought by the Société des houillères de Ronchamp, the shaft was sunk in a marshy area some twenty meters from a stream called Le Beuveroux. It has a rectangular cross-section of 5 by 2.50 meters, with three compartments: one for extraction, another for ladders, and the last for pumps and air tanks. On January 15, 1856, it was 4 meters deep. The water was pumped out by hand pumps driven by four men working hourly shifts. On February 20, the 10-horsepower steam engine for the Saint-Jean well was installed. On June 5, sinking resumed. On July 15, at a depth of 9 meters, an 11-metre-high casing was laid and three dewatering pumps installed. On April 30, 1857, at a depth of 35 meters, a new casing was installed under the first. The cost of sinking was 3,000 francs per meter dug and cased.

On February 1, 1858, the shaft reached a depth of 80 meters, and since sinking was in compact sandstone, walling was no longer necessary. On the following August 1st, sinking was stopped at a depth of 103.4 meters when the company learned that the Chatelaie borehole (undertaken in the same sector by a rival company, the Société des Ingénieurs) had descended to a depth of 600 meters without encountering any coal. On February 8, 1873, the shaft was officially abandoned at the same time as the Saint-Jean shaft; it was simply surrounded by a barbed-wire fence and backfilled with bundles of wood. In 1958, it was backfilled at the behest of the Champagney town council for safety reasons, and a concrete slab was finally poured.

At the beginning of the 21st century, the well was under a high-voltage power line (linking the Ronchamp substation to Belfort) in a marshland crossed by the Beuveroux.

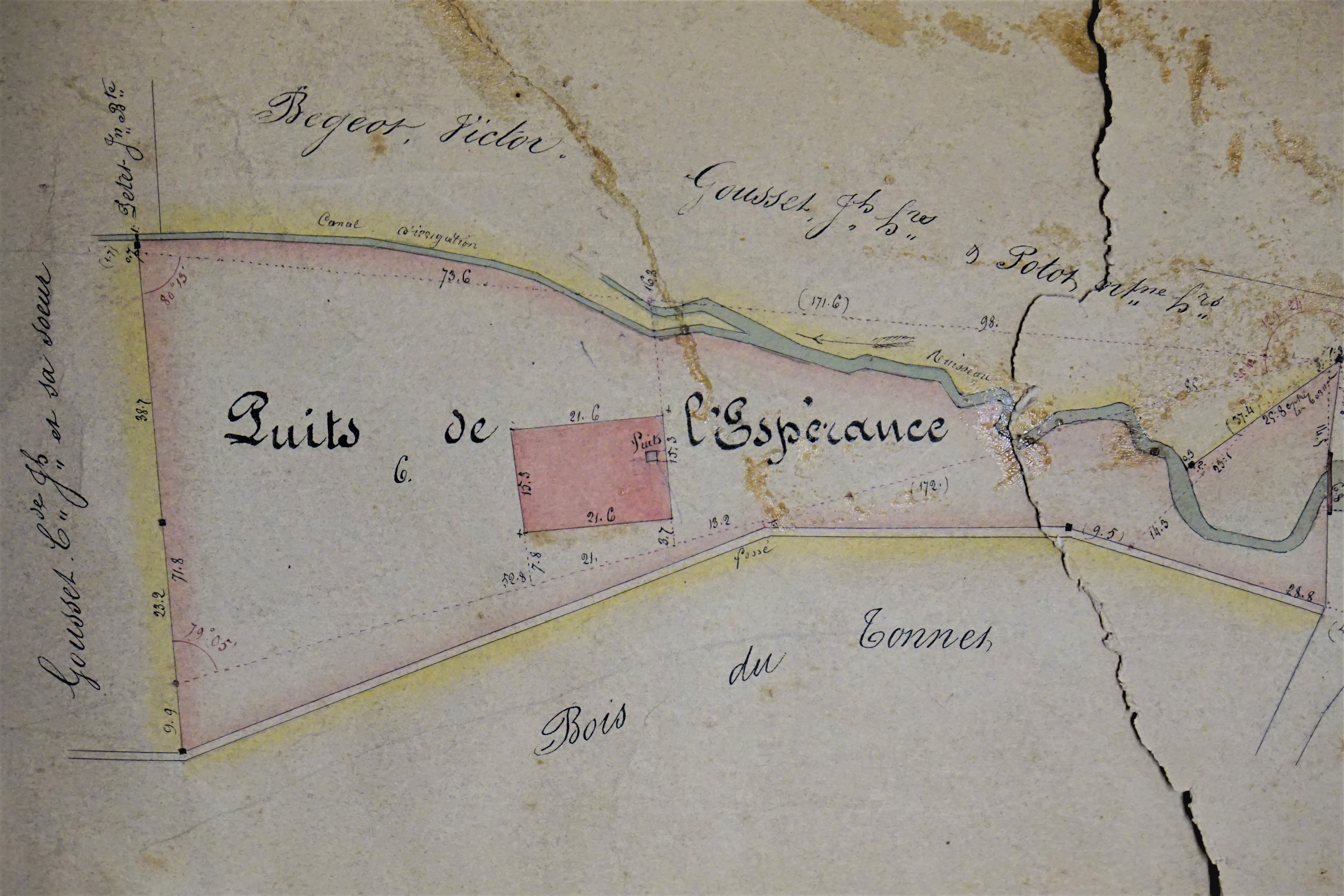
Plan of shaft installations

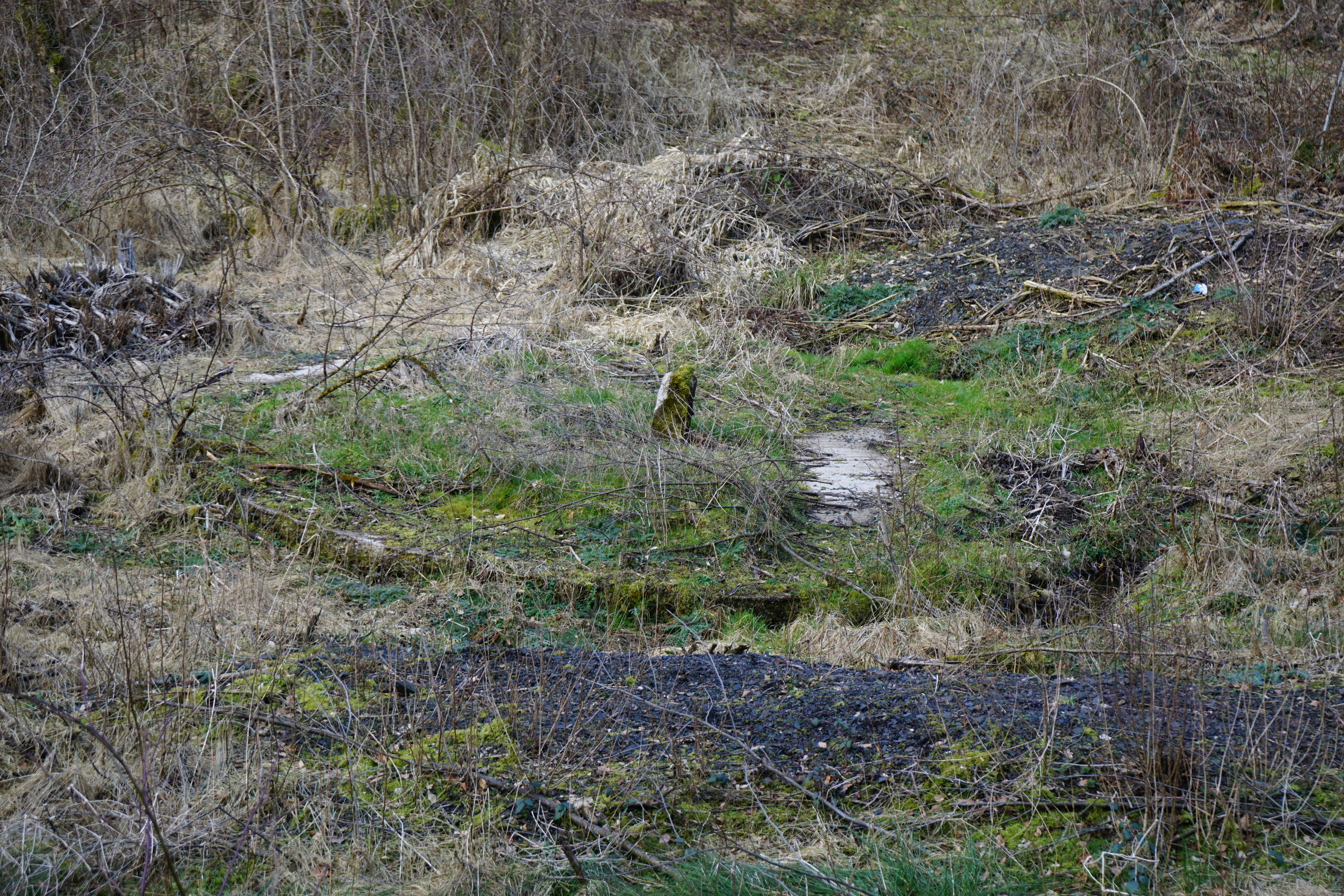
The slab of the Espérance well

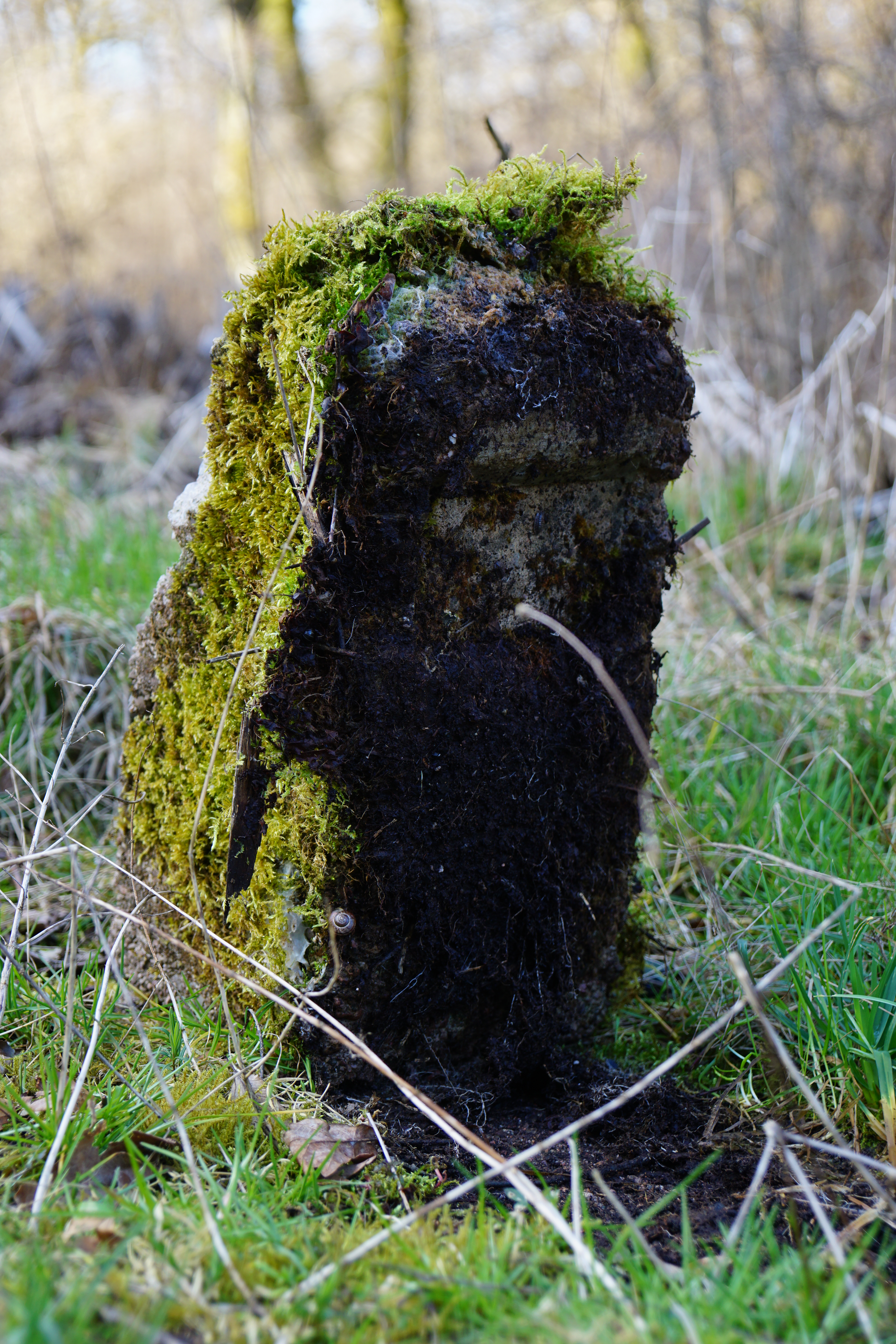
The milestone

== Sainte-Marie shaft ==
47.703076°N 6.630099°E

The Sainte-Marie shaft saw very irregular activity between 1866 and 1958. The reinforced concrete headframe dates from 1924. Since March 29, 2001, the headframe, the last surviving architectural reminder of the Ronchamp coal mines, has been listed as a historical monument with the xxe siècle label.

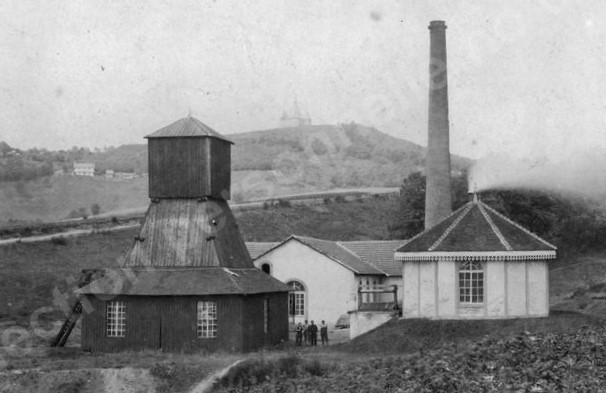
The old Sainte-Marie well installations, circa 1884

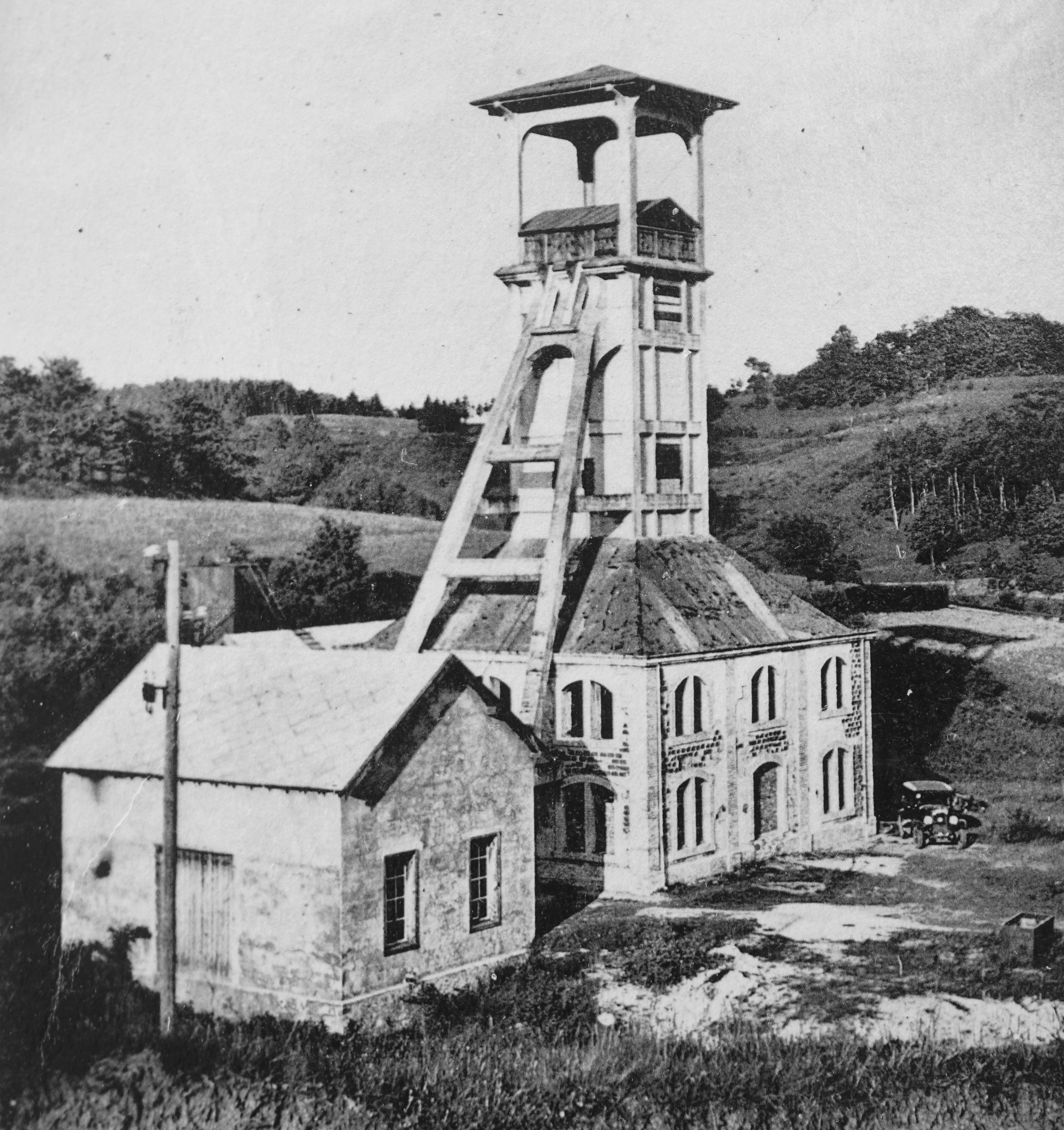
The concrete headframe, circa 1930

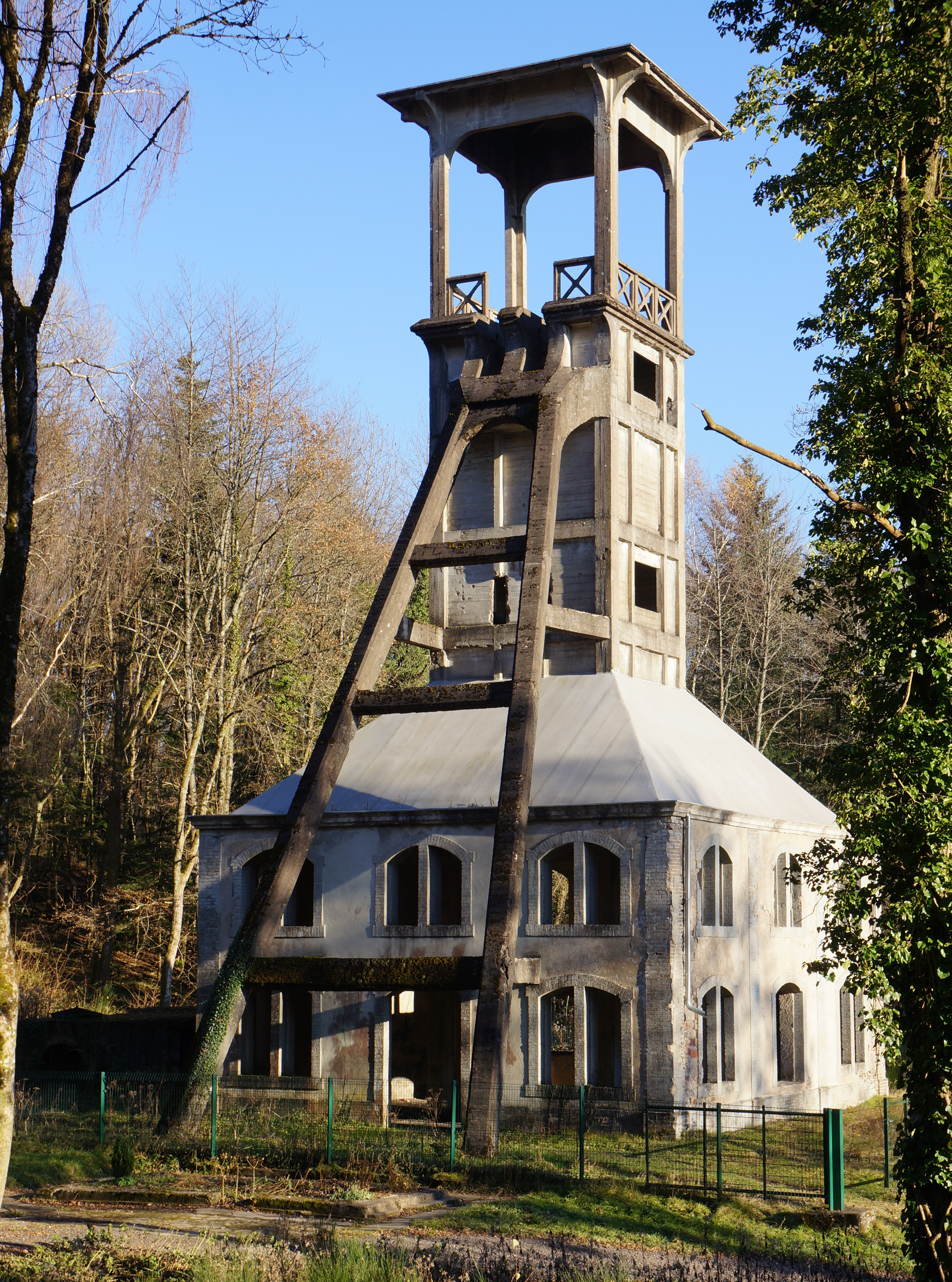
The headframe in 2013

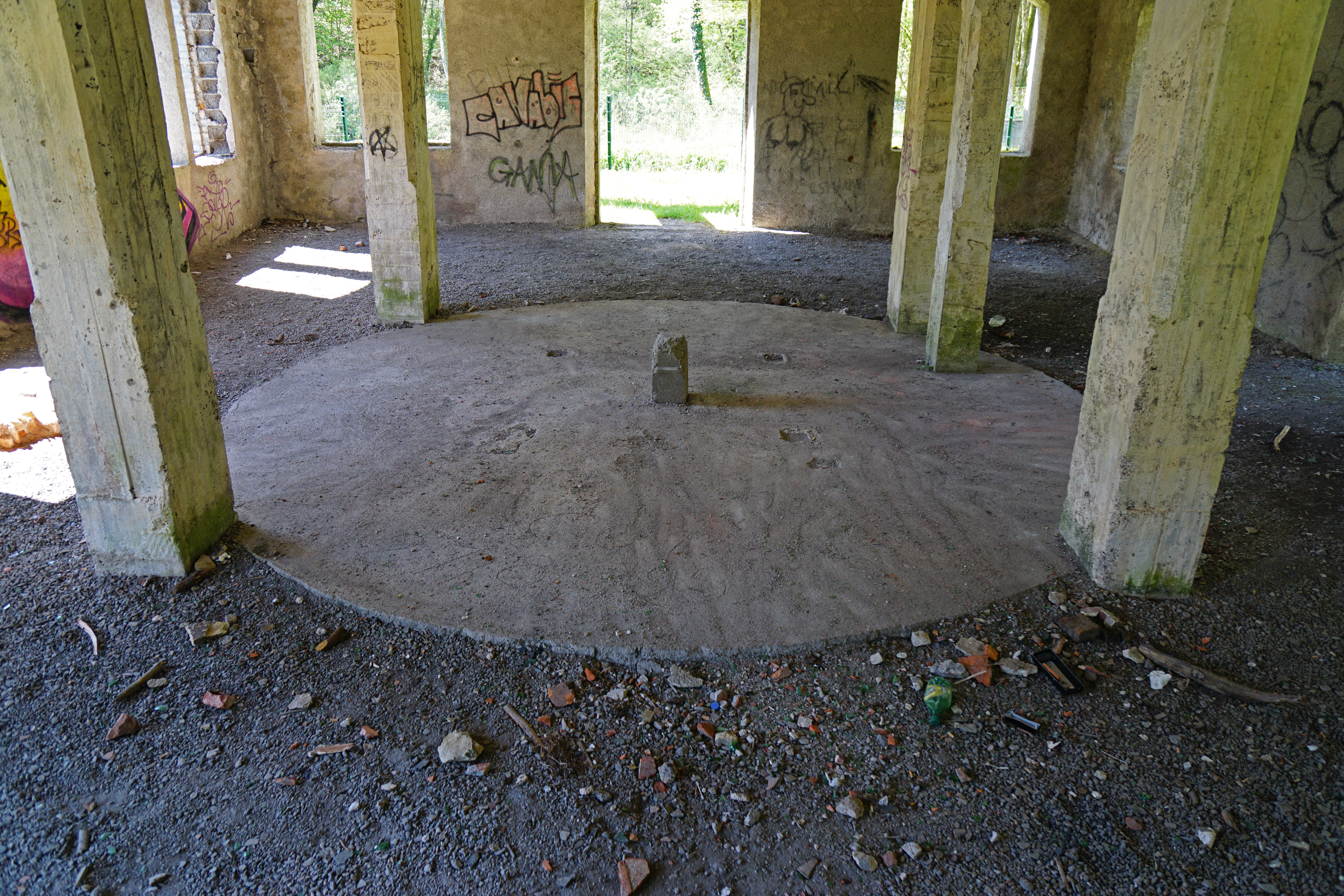
The Sainte-Marie shaft slab

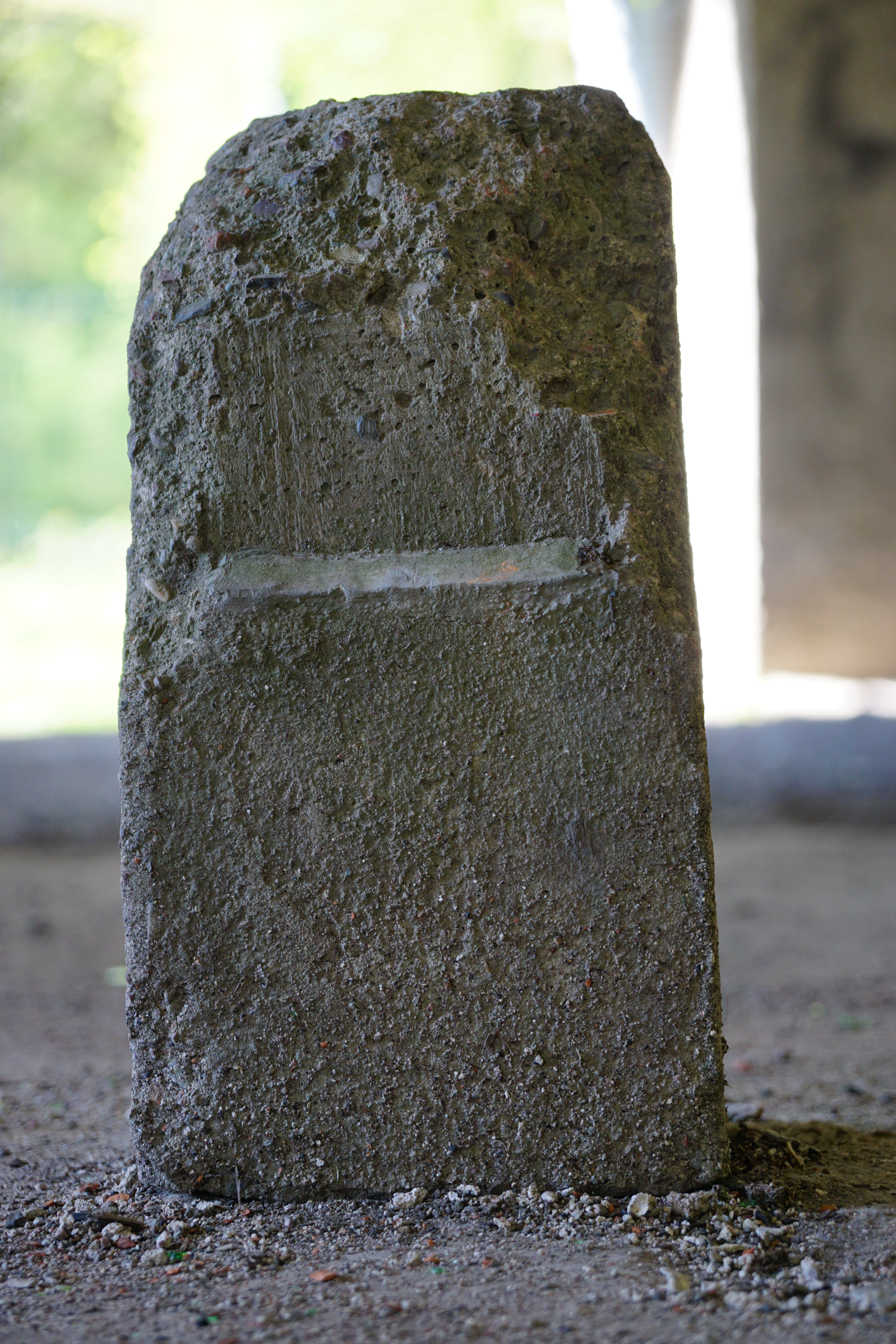
Sainte-Marie shaft milestone

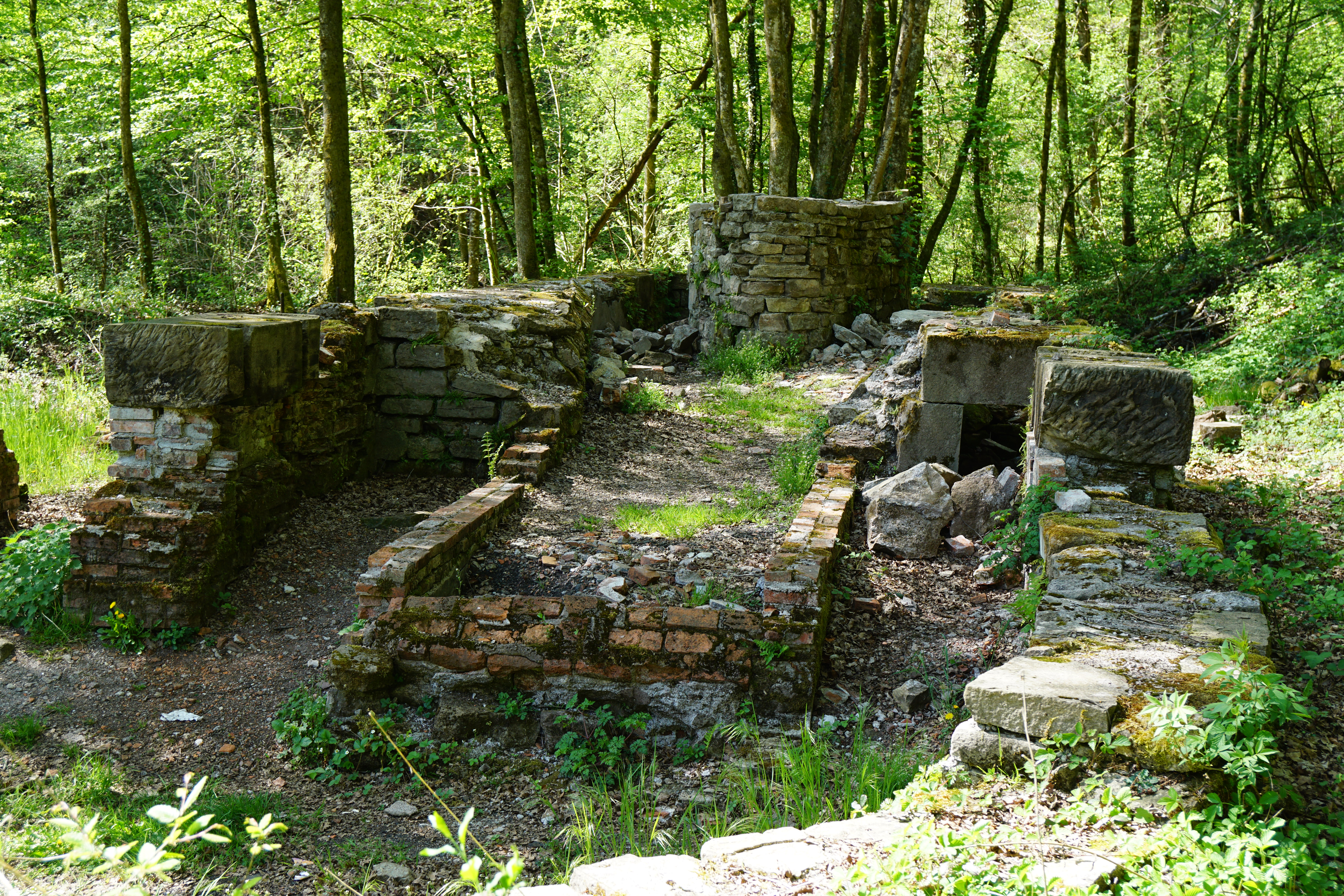
The old 19th-century building

== Saint-Georges shaft ==
47.687666°N 6.667103°E

In 1864, Ronchamp collieries began sinking the Sainte-Marie shaft to the west of the mined basin and planned to sink another shaft to the east. Sinking began on July 10, 1866. A steam engine drives the Saint-Georges shaft, which has a circular cross-section with a diameter of 3.75 meters, and a brick partition separates the extraction and ventilation compartments. It is equipped with a 26.80-meter wooden casing, topped by a five-meter concrete reinforcement. This is the first circular shaft in the Ronchamp mining basin to be walled in over its entire height.

On January 8, 1868, the coalfield was encountered at 440 meters, with a first bed of 60 centimeters of coal at a depth of 447 meters and a second of 35 centimeters at 453 meters. These results were due to ground uplift. In 1869, the ventilator of the Saint-Charles shaft was installed on the pit floor to provide better ventilation for the research work undertaken at the bottom of the mine. In June 1871, a long drift was driven into the small coalbeds encountered to the south-west. However, the work encountered an uplift 200 meters from the shaft. This was crossed by a rock gallery. It was in this gallery that dynamite was used at the bottom of a mine for the first time in France. These were comparative tests with gunpowder. In March 1873, work was suspended.

In 1881, after having been abandoned for ten years, the company considered using the Saint-Georges shaft to replace the Sainte-Pauline, Sainte-Barbe and Notre-Dame shafts; the engineers were thinking of linking it to the Tonnet shaft then under construction. In the end, however, the investment would be too unprofitable. The Magny shaft to the south of the coalfield was producing better results. In 1958, a concrete slab topped by a bollard was poured. At the beginning of the 21st century, the Saint-Georges well was located on the side of a Chemin.

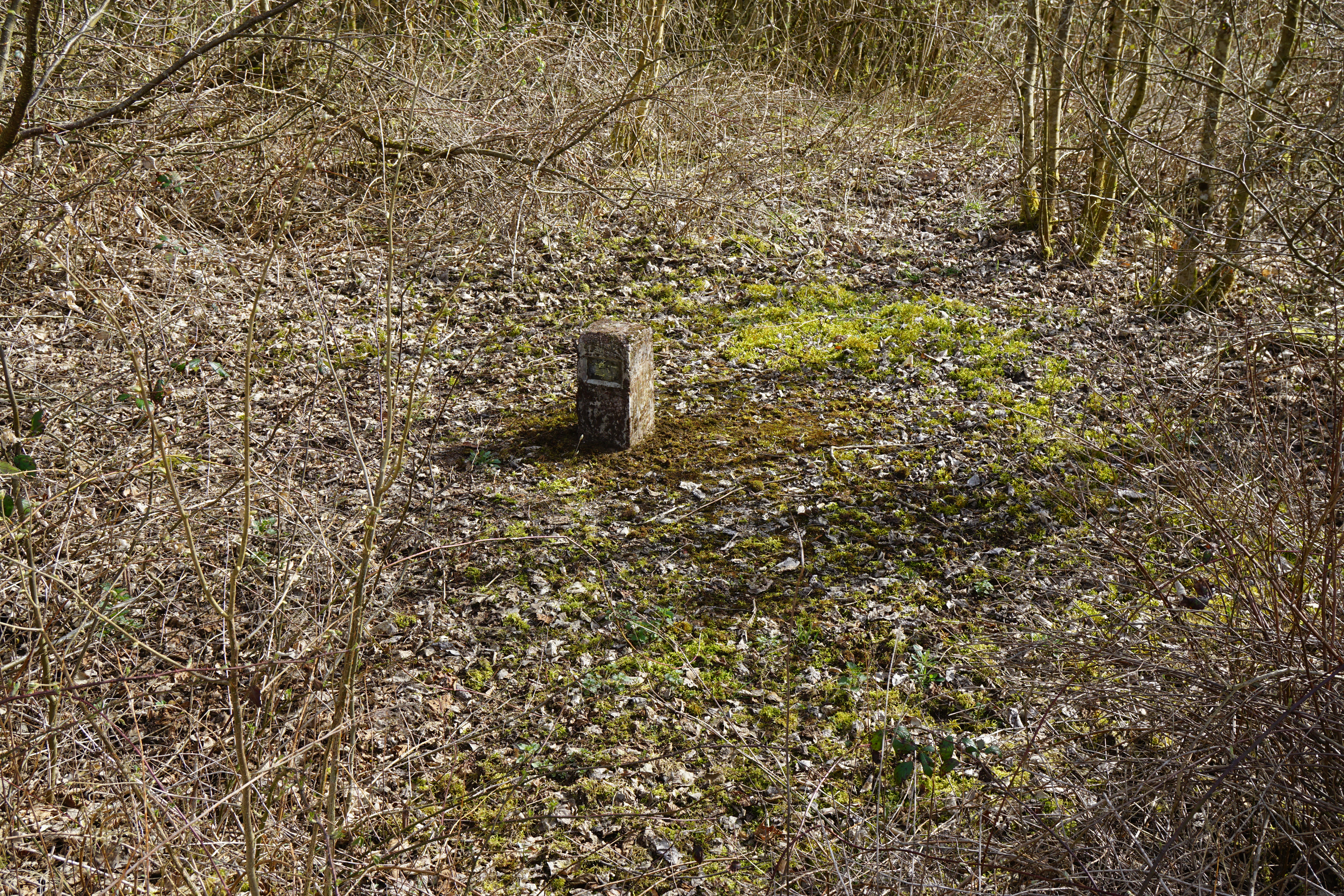
The Saint-Georges shaft slab

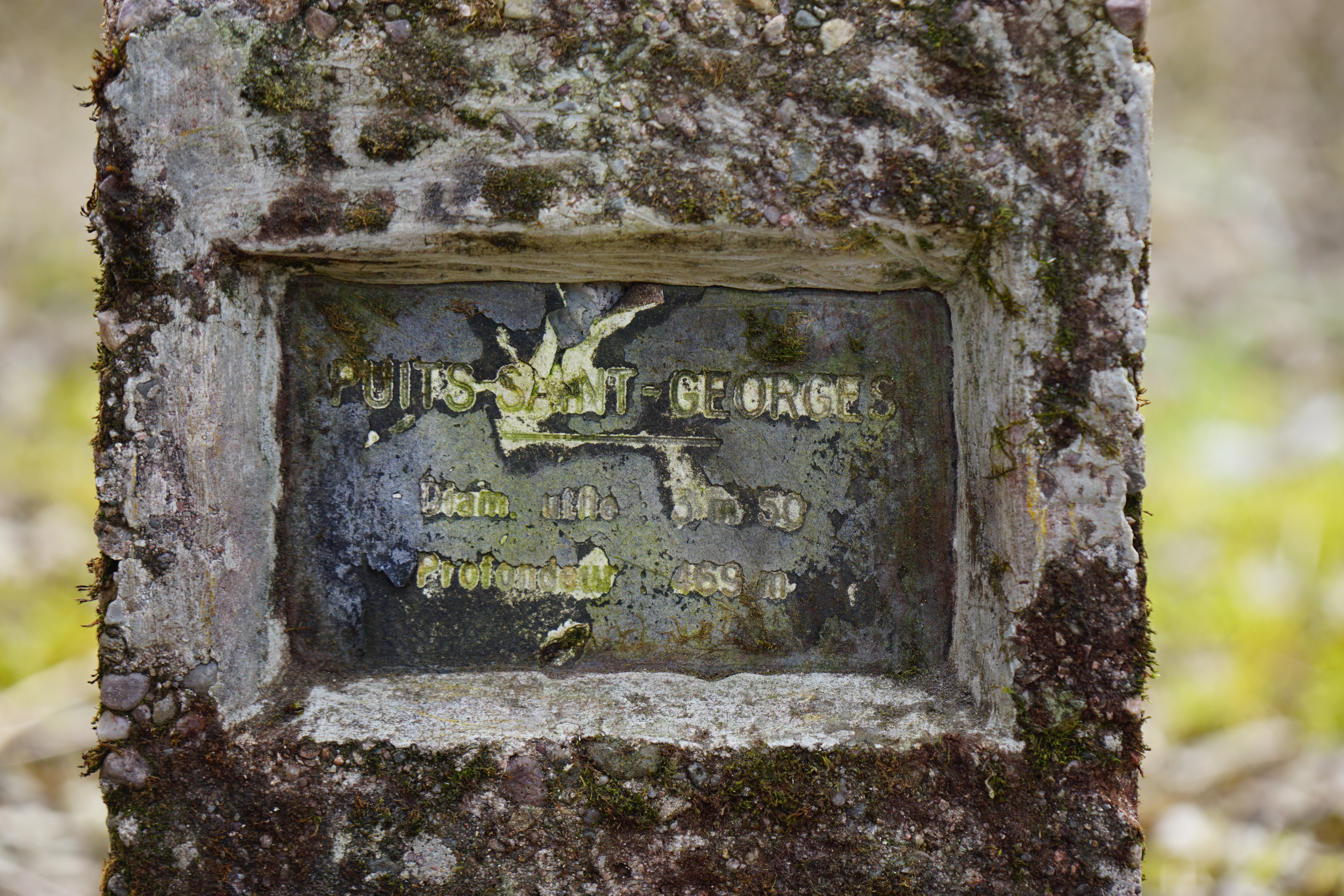
The milestone

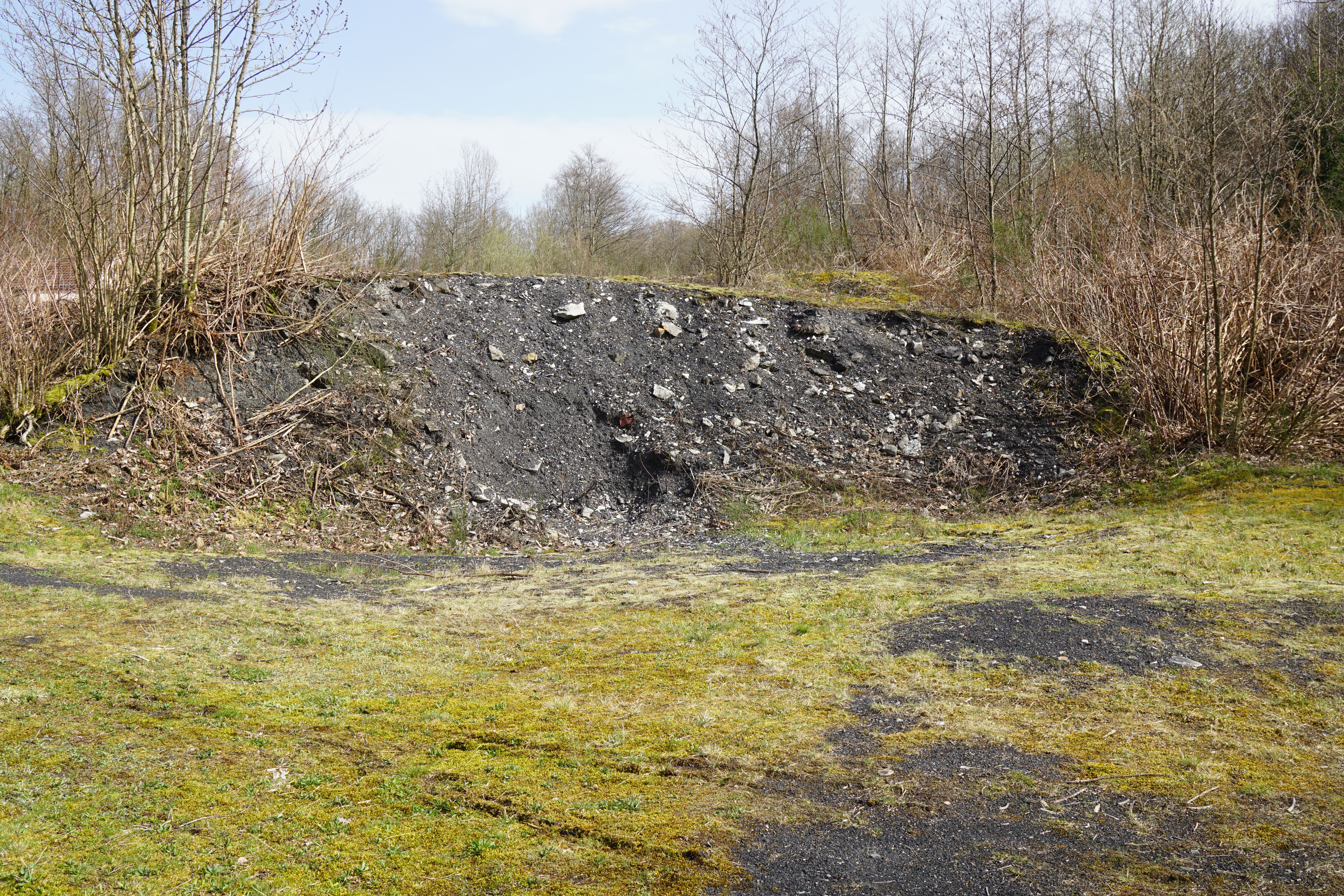
The slag heap

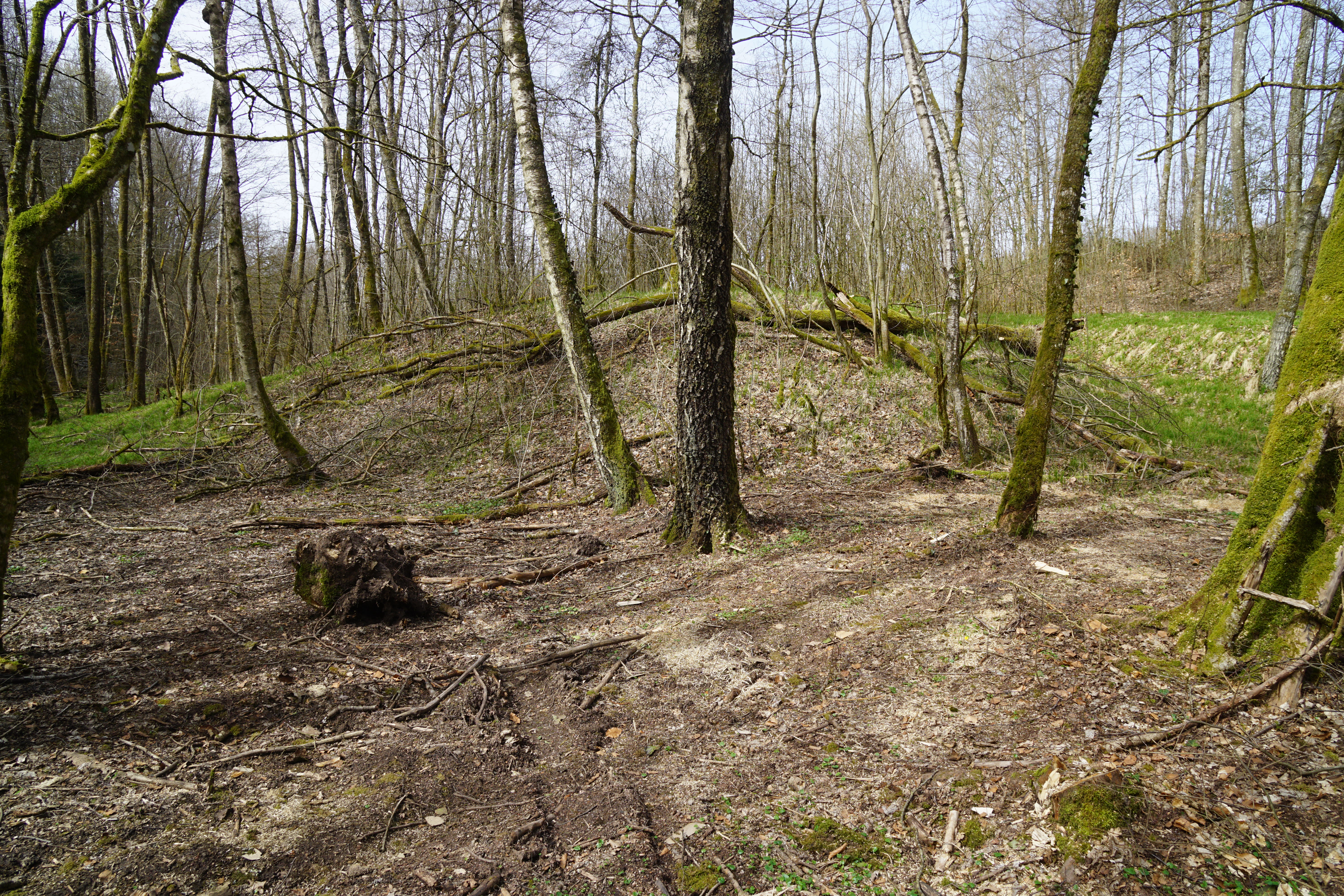
Wooded end

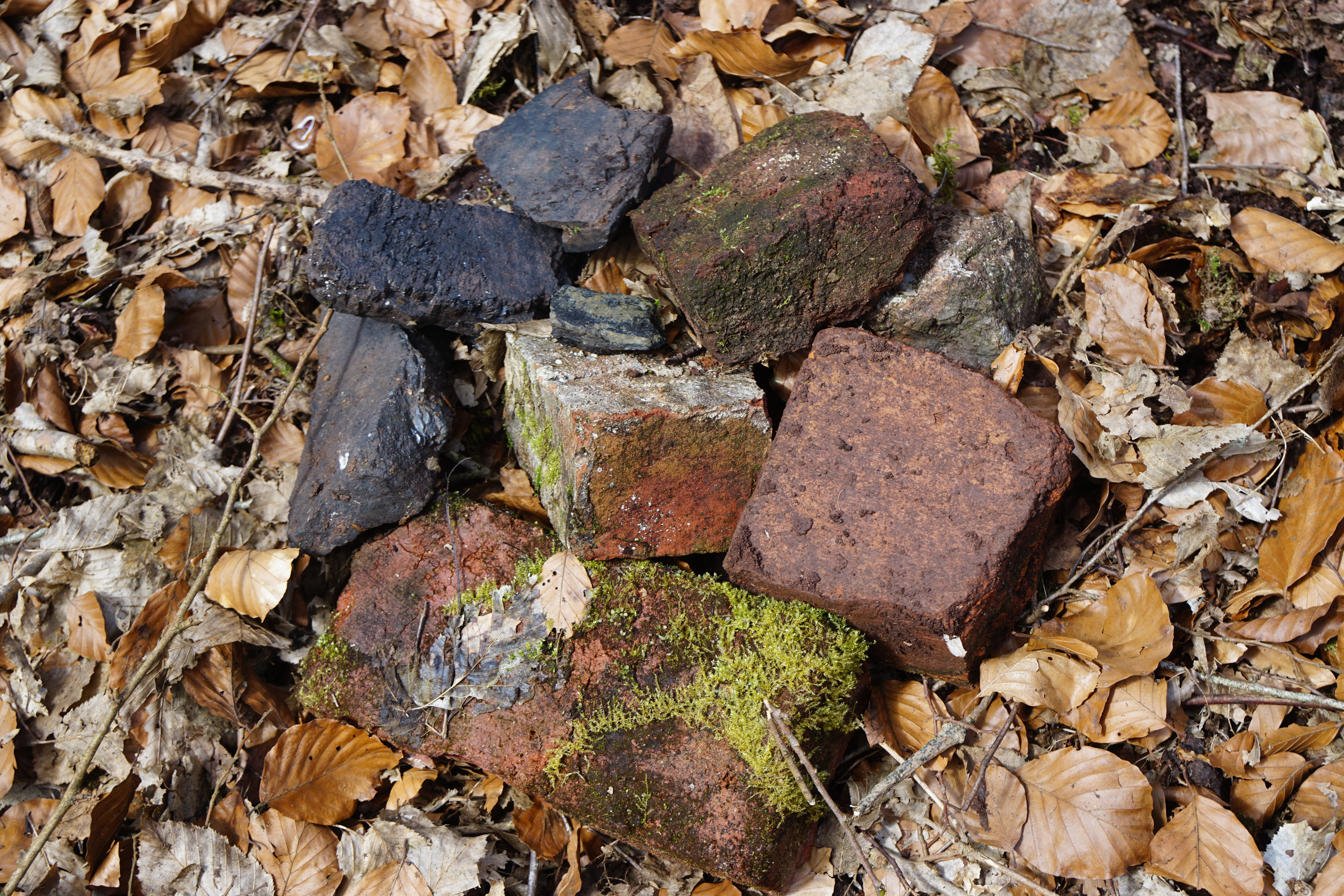
Shale from slag heaps and bricks from old buildings

== Saint-Paul shaft ==
47.710150°N 6.610006°E

This exploratory well was started by the Mourière company on September 1, 1873, in the sandstone 1,100 meters southeast of the de-la-Croix shaft. It has a diameter of 3.5 meters. The coalfield is encountered 158 meters below the surface, but the shaft is subsequently deepened to 250 meters. Several exploratory drifts were driven northwards for 200 meters and southwards for over 300 meters. But no mineable coal was found at the bottom of the Saint-Paul shaft.

The steam engine used for extraction is powered by coal extracted from the workings installed in the Renaissance galleries. An unguided bucket is used to lower and raise equipment and men. Some twenty workers were employed on the Saint-Paul shaft. The shaft was finally abandoned and backfilled in 1882. At the beginning of the 21st century, the Saint-Paul shaft is a funnel filled with waste.

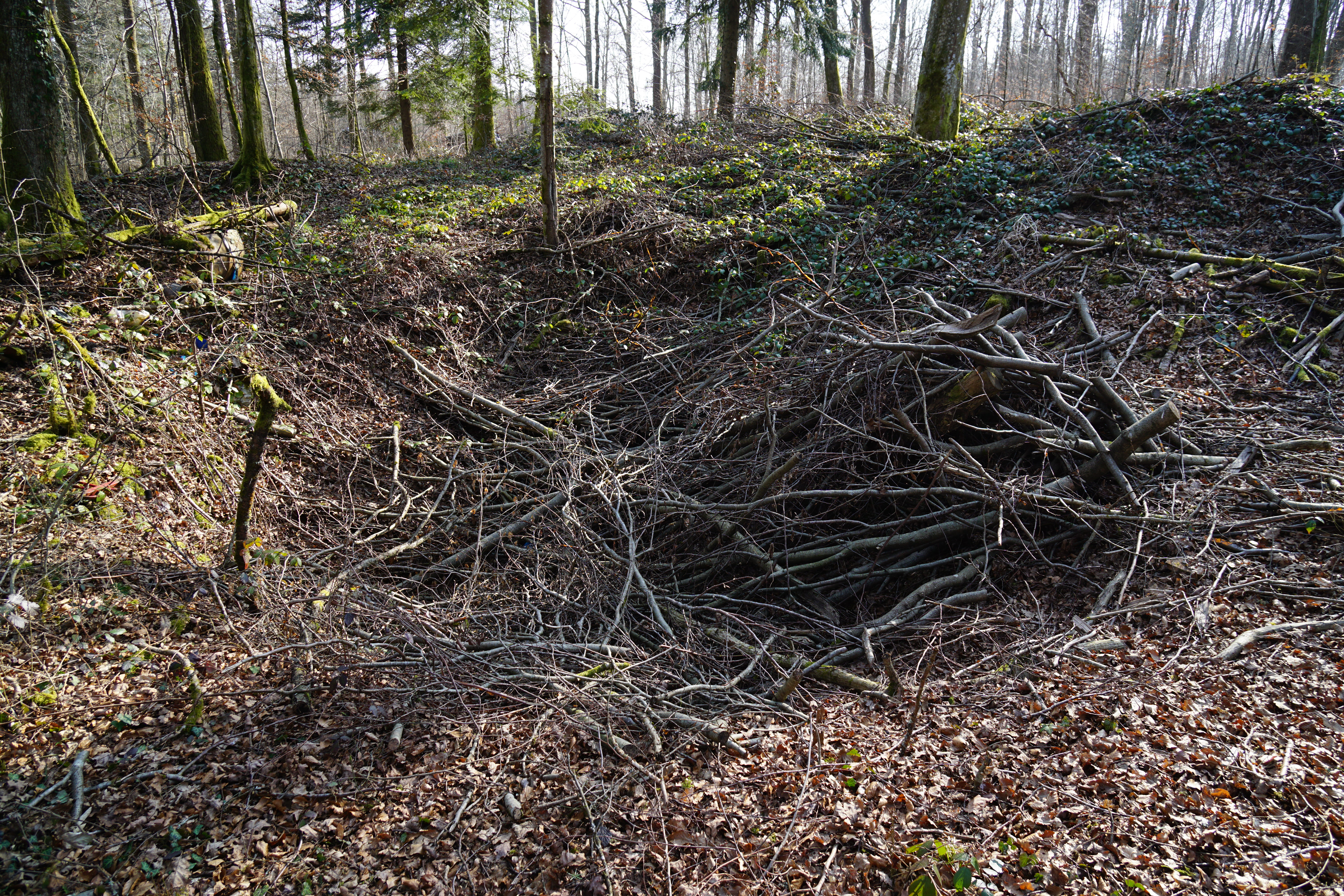
The Saint-Paul shaft.

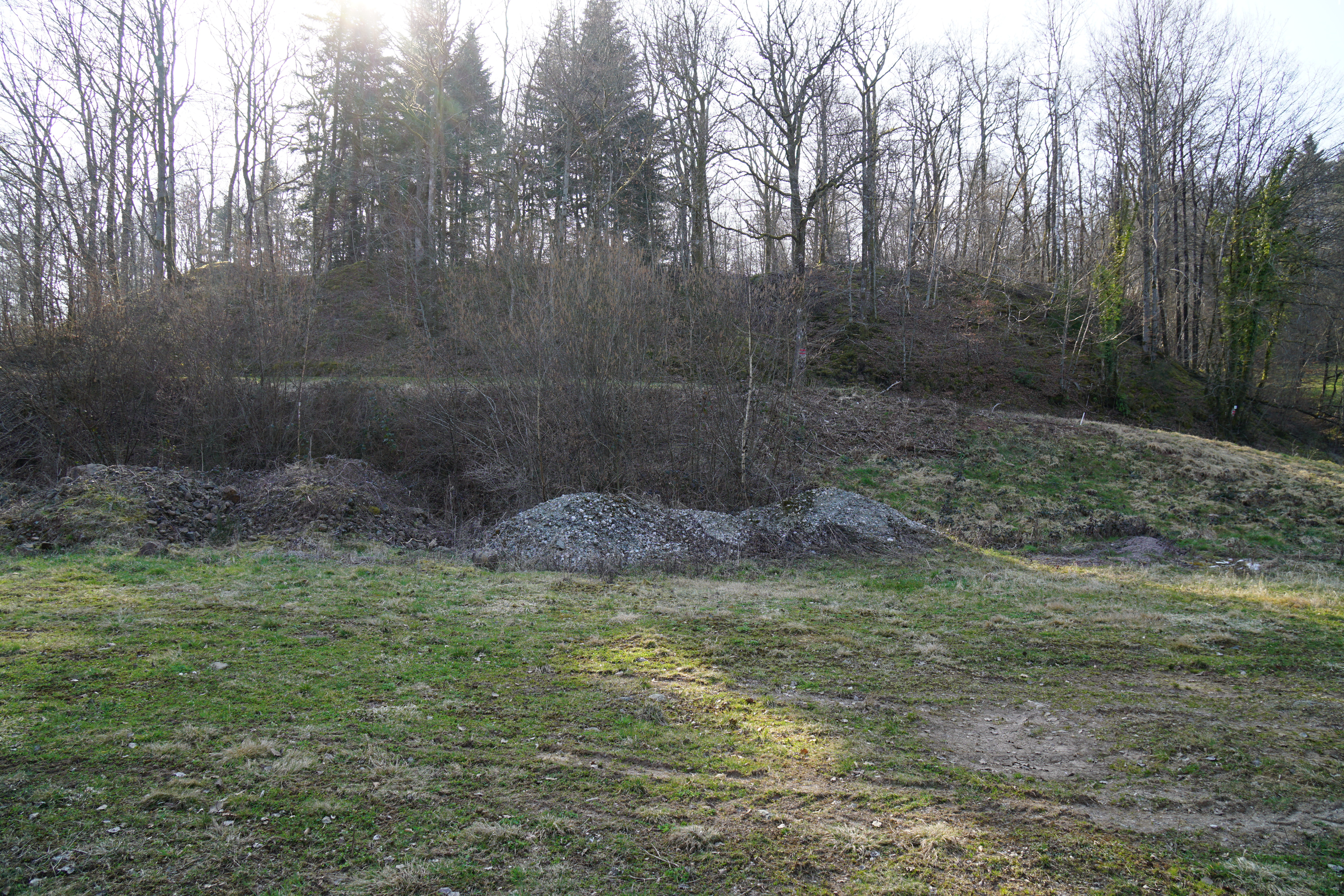
The slag heap

== Chanois shaft ==
47.693339°N 6.629723°E

The Chanois pit was the center of Ronchamp's coal mining operations from the end of the 19th century until the mines closed in 1958. It was therefore chosen as the site for the coal mine's ancillary facilities, including a coal washing plant, a coking plant and a thermal power station, succeeding the Saint-Joseph shaft. At the beginning of the 21st century, many remnants of these facilities remain.

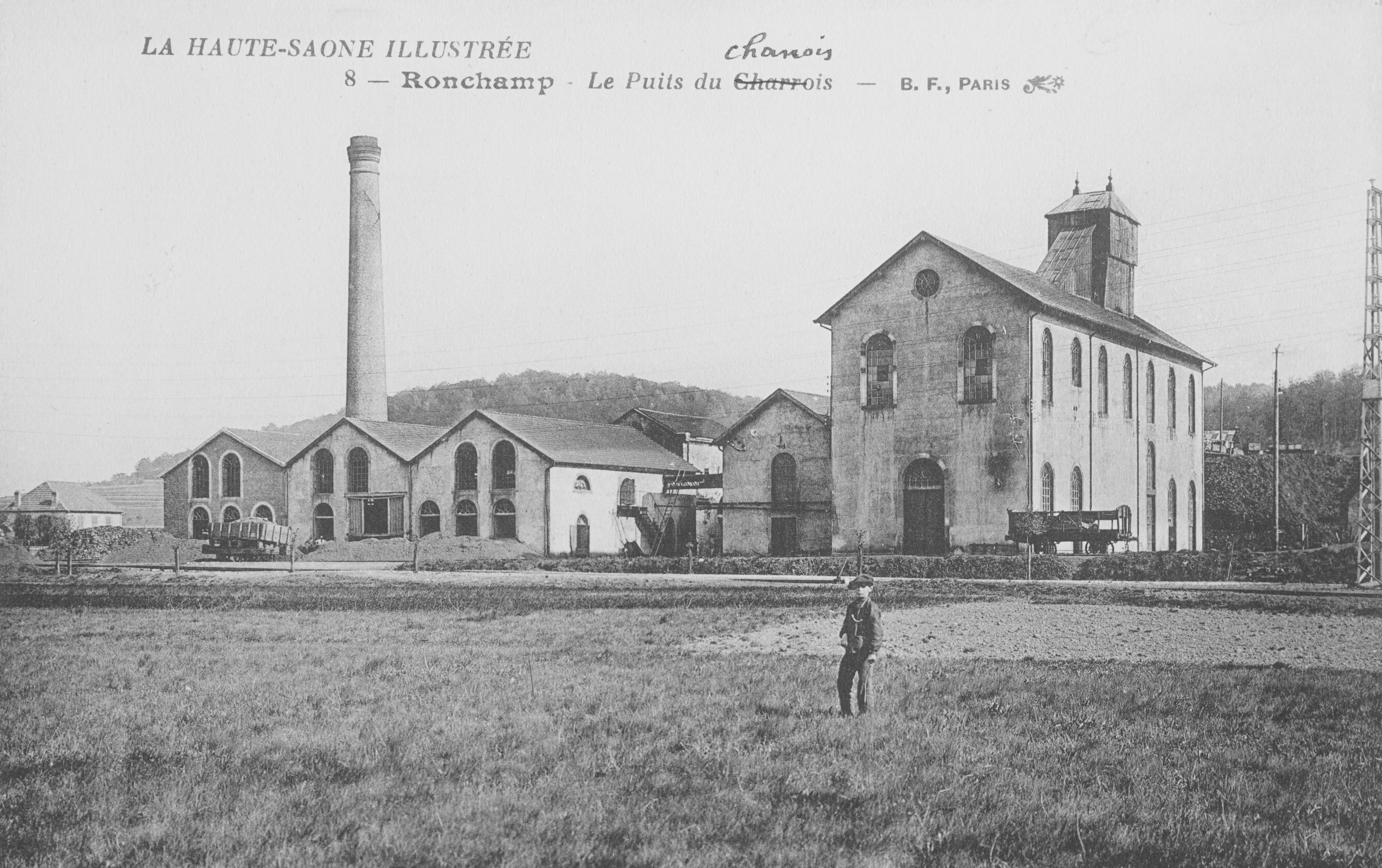
The active shaft.

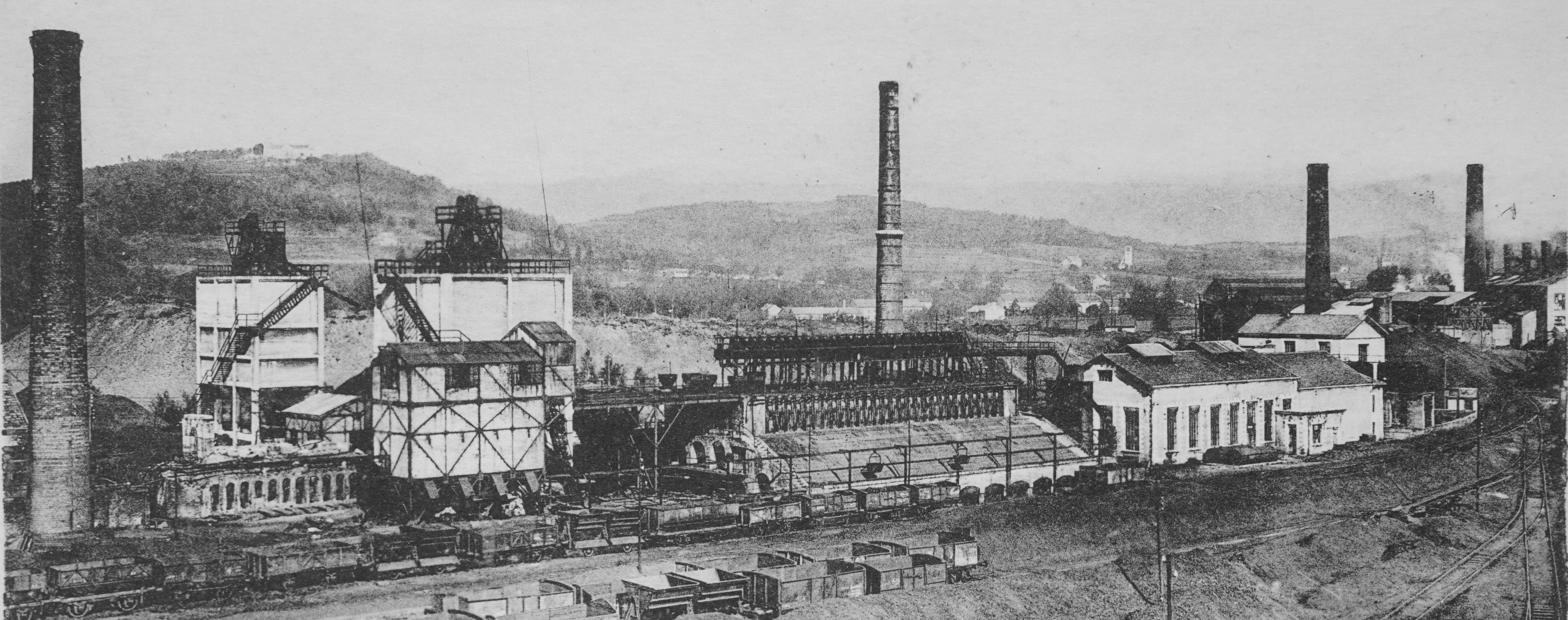
General view of the coking plant and power station.

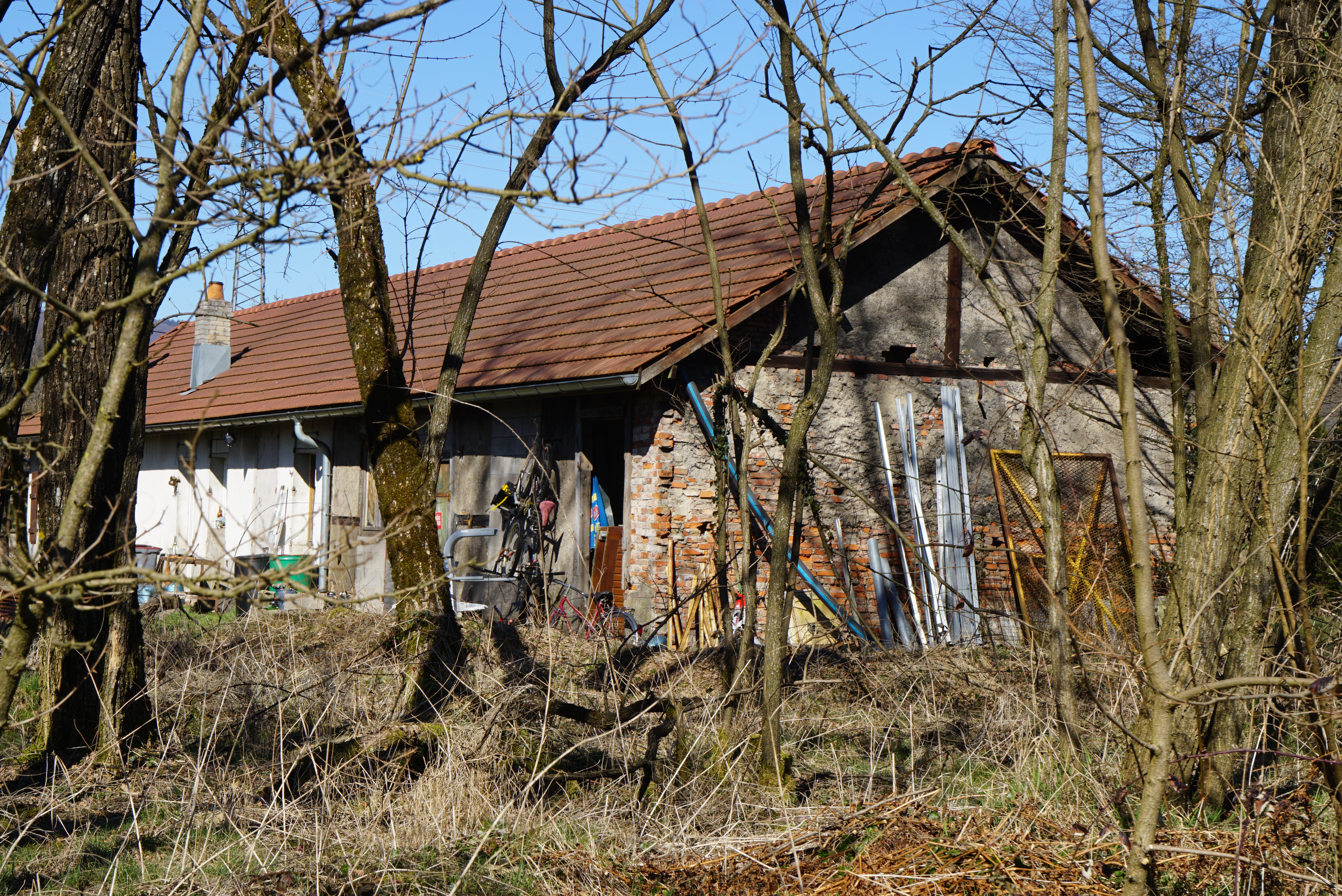
La lampisterie du puits du Chanois.

== Magny shaft ==
47.687648°N 6.633452°E

The Magny shaft is 694 meters deep, making it the deepest mine shaft in France when it was commissioned in 1878. It is also the Ronchamp shaft with the longest period of operation, at 80 years. This long period of mining was interspersed with several periods of service, the longest lasting a decade. It was from this shaft that the last coal train in the coalfield was hauled up on Saturday, May 3, 1958. At the beginning of the 21st century, a few more or less well-preserved buildings remain, including the former administration building.

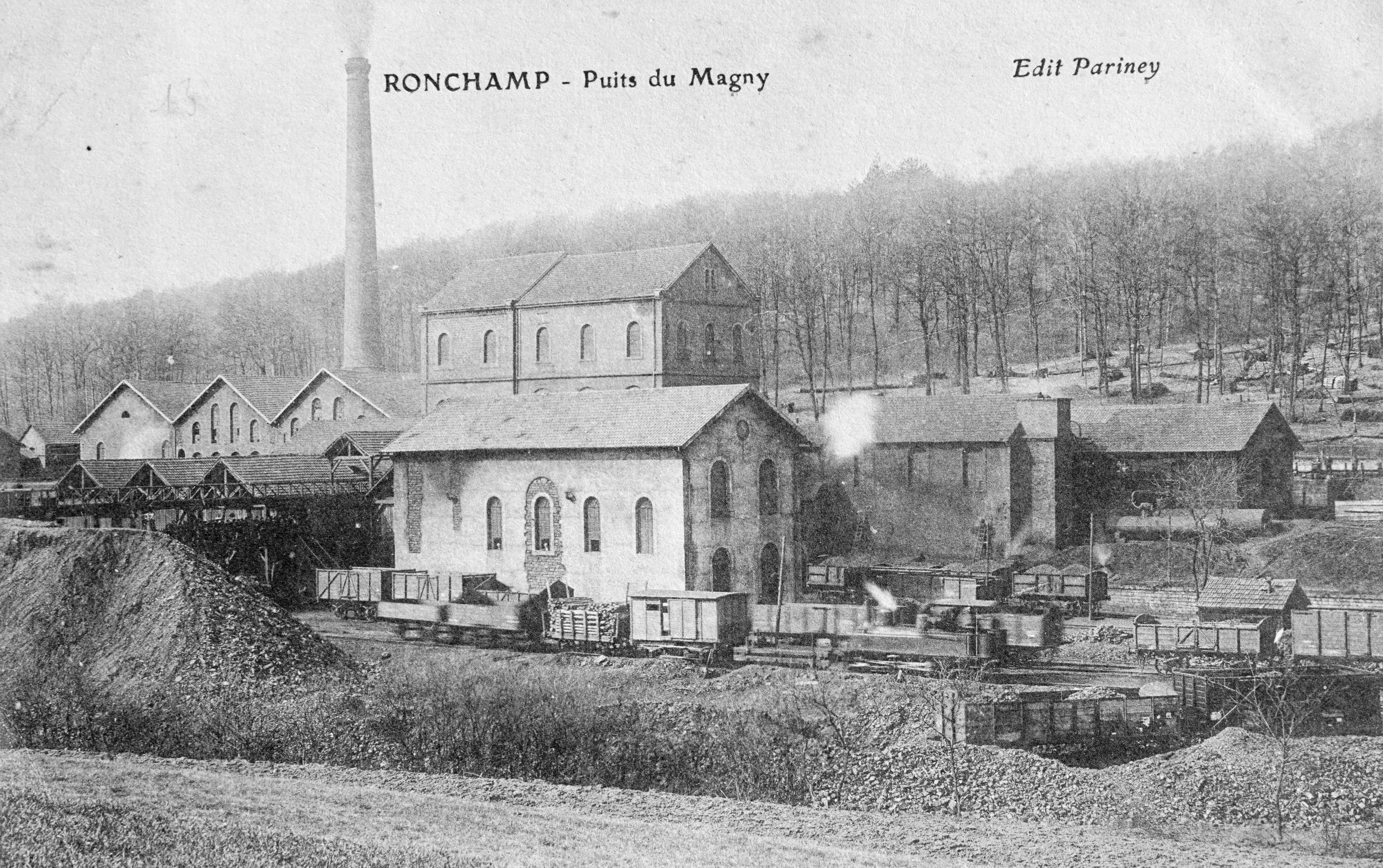
The pit in full operation, with wagons and locomotives belonging to the coal-mining rail network.

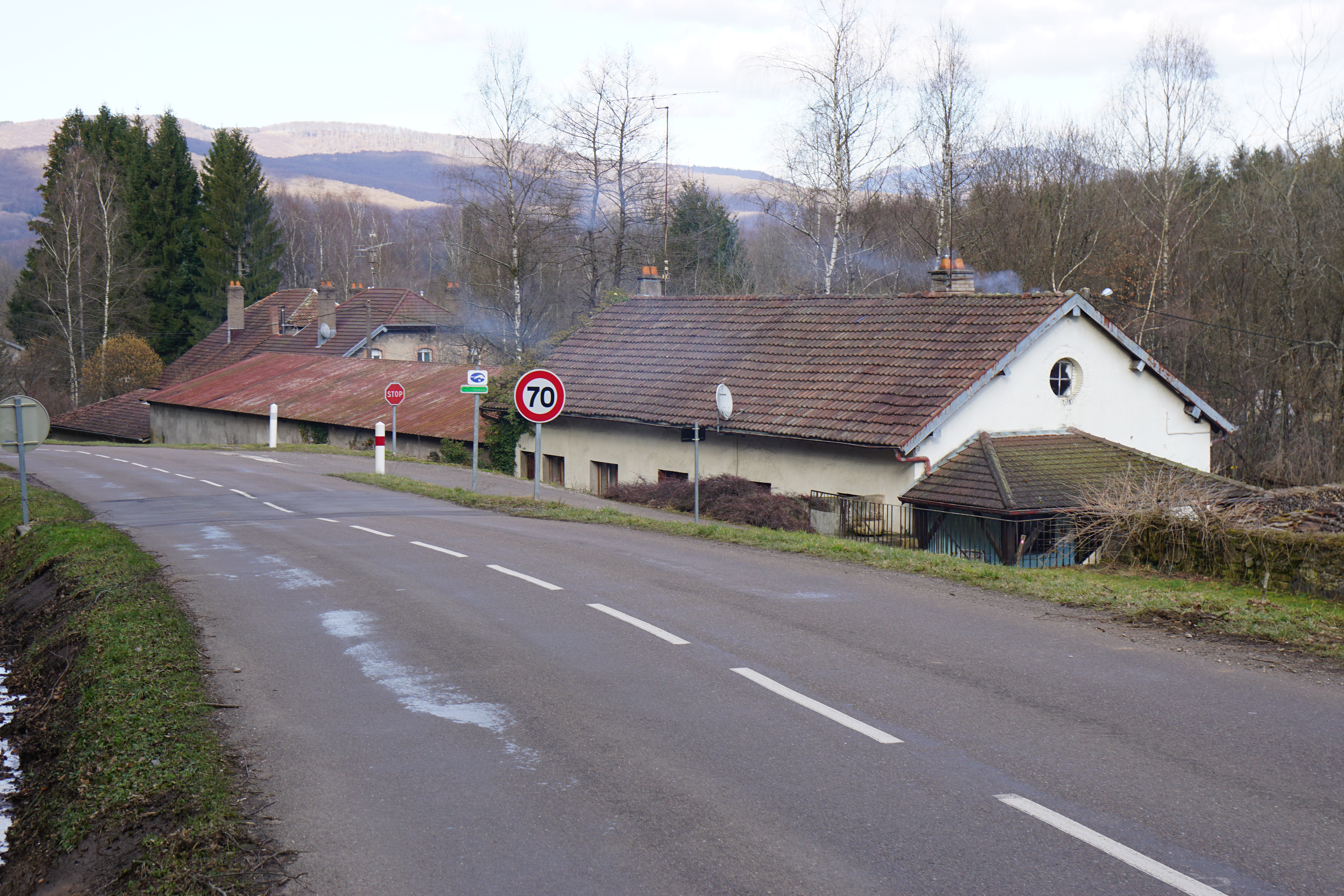
General view of the Magny well from the Ronchamp-Clairegoutte road. In the foreground, the white-painted boiler house, now converted into housing.

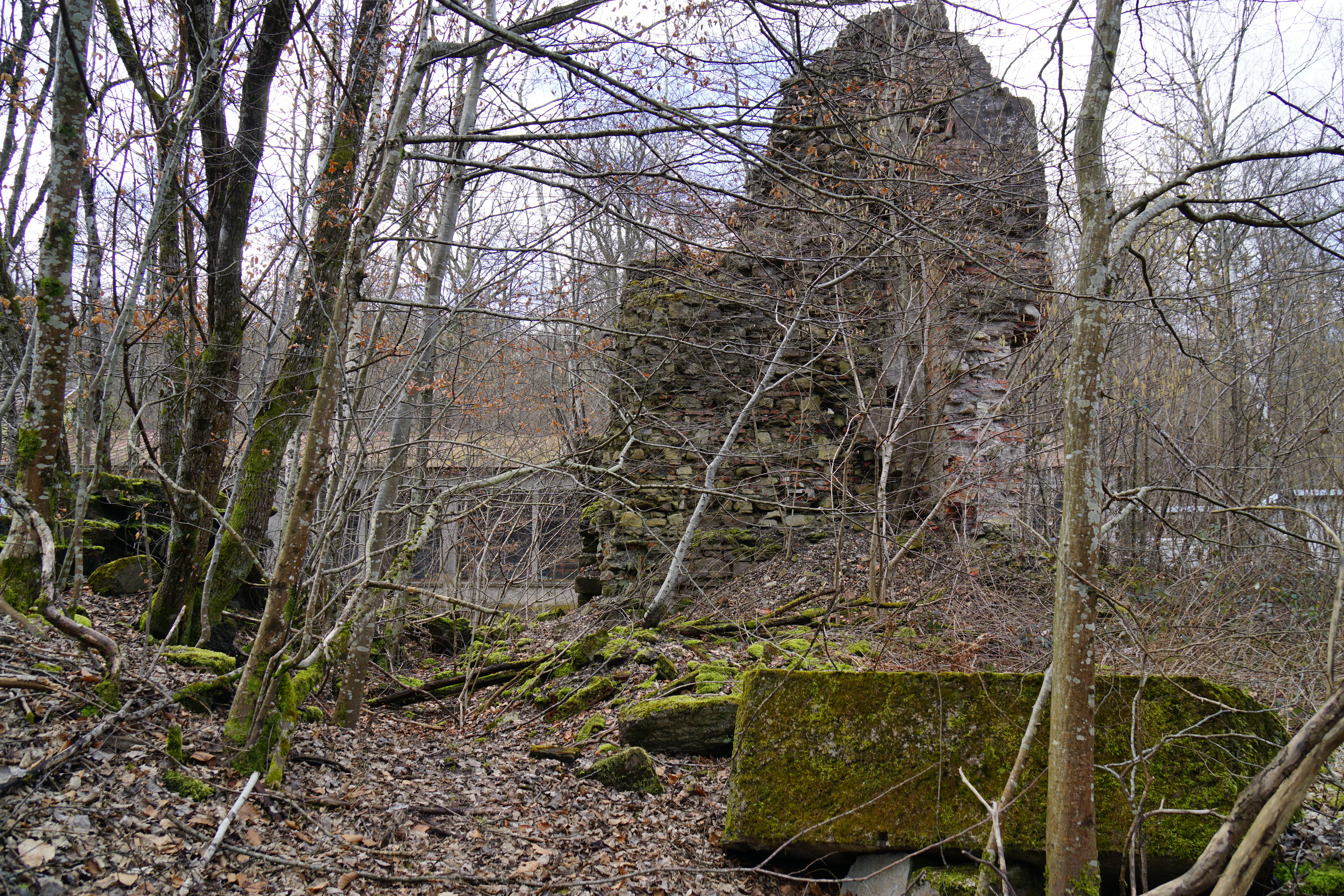
Ruins of the extraction building

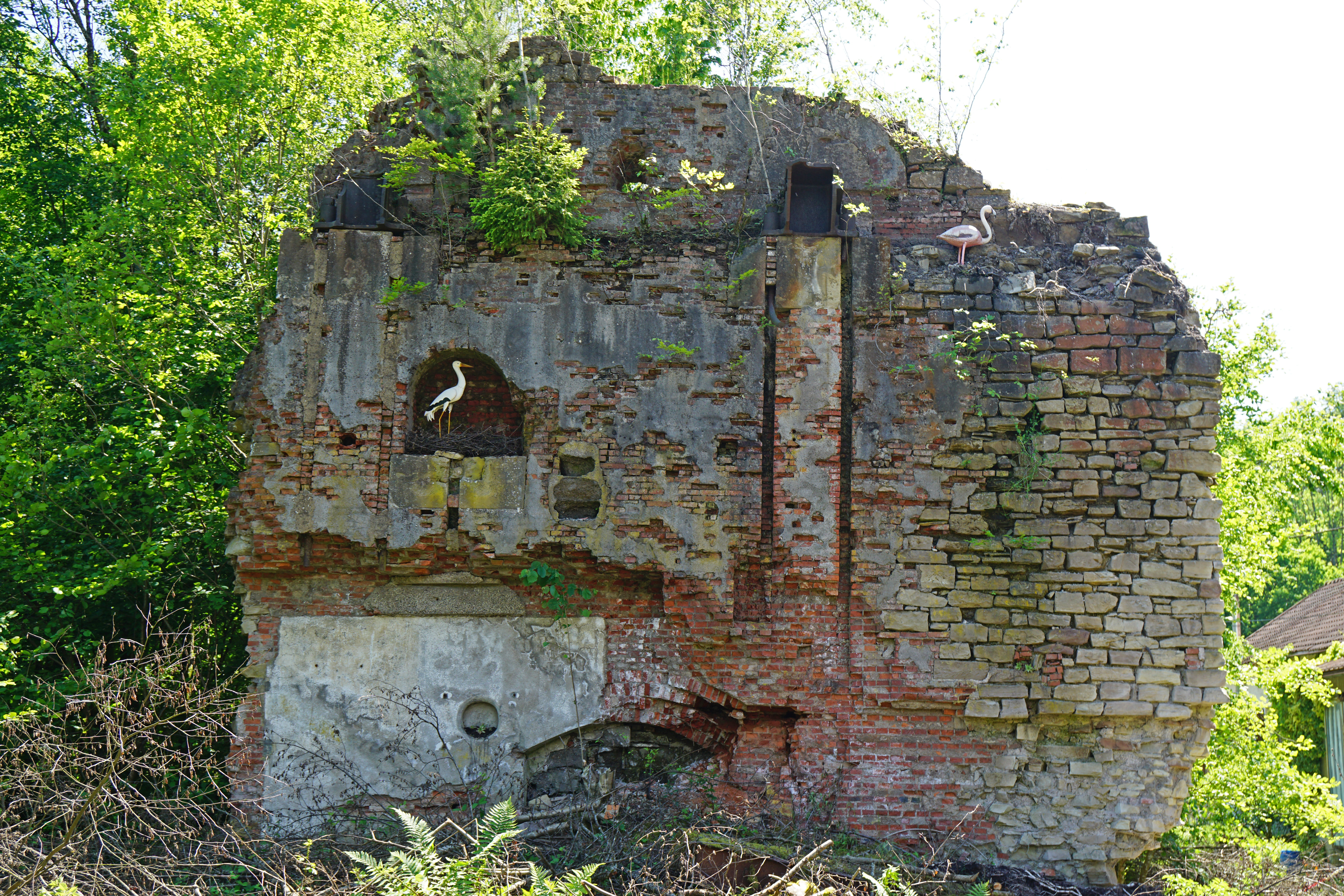
Old wall belonging to the Magny well revenue building

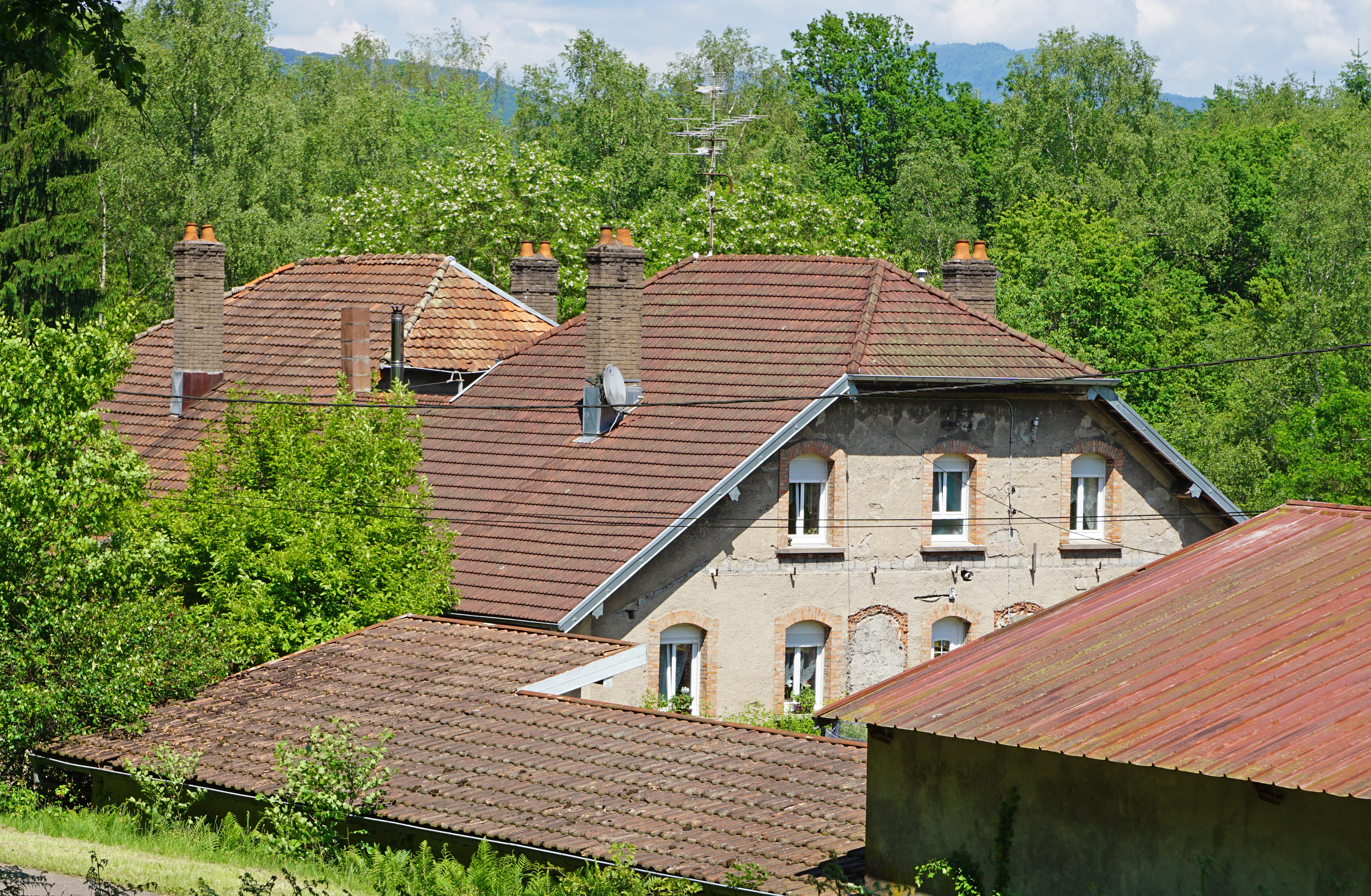
The administration building, built in 1927.

== Tonnet shaft / n^{o} 9 ==
47.683661°N 6.659464°E

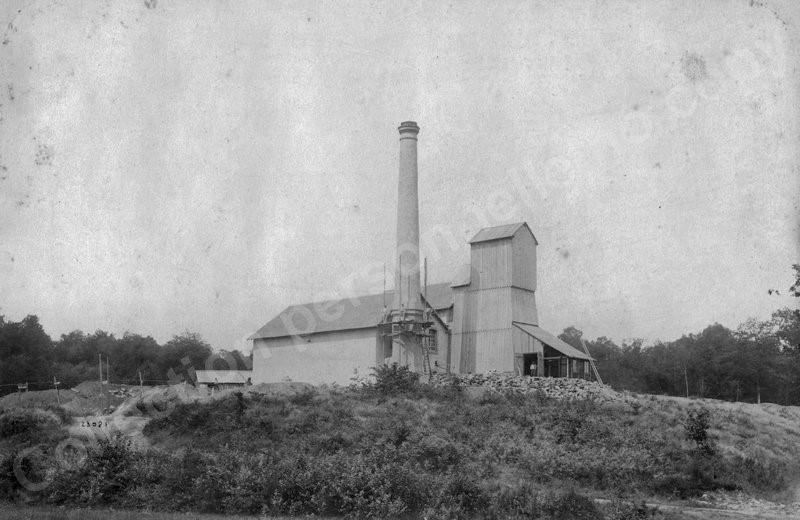
The ruins of the Tonnet shaft.

On June 14, 1881, the Board of Directors decided to dig a new extraction shaft south of Sainte-Pauline. The plan was for this new No. 9 shaft to be connected to the Saint-Georges shaft, which would be equipped for ventilation and extraction if necessary. Sinking of the shaft began in 1883, south of the Espérance shaft and 700 meters from the Saint-Georges shaft. The shaft has a diameter of 3.4 meters. It is fully walled and has a ventilation compartment. A first casing is installed from the surface, followed by a second at a depth of 35 meters. The water supply at this depth is 250 m^{3} per day. In 1884, at a depth of 518 meters, a new water supply required the installation of a reservoir at the bottom of the shaft and pumps at the surface. In 1885, a miner was killed by a falling object.

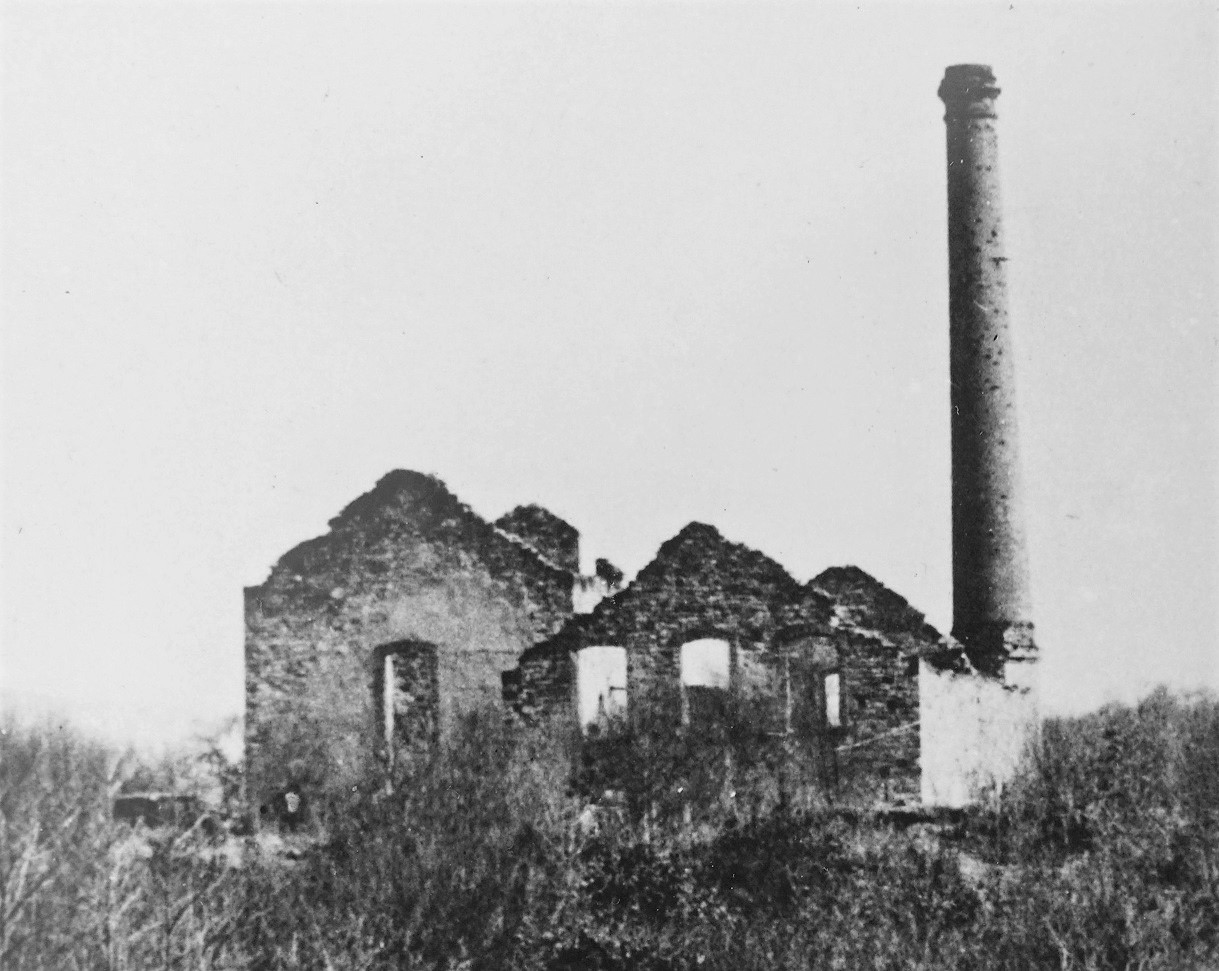
The ruins of the Tonnet shaft

The following year, the shaft was sunk at a rate of 17 meters per month, and the first layer of coal was encountered at a depth of 558 meters. It was 60 centimeters thick, interspersed with five shale beds. The shaft is deepened to 574 meters, where a research gallery is dug to the south. Ten meters further down, a second gallery was created for ventilation. Research continued for two years. The miners now encounter only patchy benches. Mining ceased definitively at the Tonnet shaft on June 8, 1888.

In 1950, during the period of reconstruction, the company considered relaunching mining operations at the Notre-Dame and Tonnet shafts. But this would require rehabilitating 700 meters of track and fitting out the Tonnet shaft for extraction, at an estimated cost of one billion francs. In 1954, the defense committee called for resumption of mining at the Tonnet shaft, arguing that the shaft column was in good condition and that engineers such as Dumay, Egerman and Poussigue had estimated coal reserves of 500,000 tonnes. Research carried out by drifting at the bottom of the mine and by drilling in the Champagney plain showed that this region of the mining basin contained exploitable layers that had remained unexploited. Four years later, the ruins of the buildings were demolished. The shaft was backfilled with shale and a concrete slab topped by a bollard was poured.

At the beginning of the 21st century, the concrete slab of the well, topped by its milestone, still stands atop a small butte. These remains are part of the "Les étangs du Chérimont" walking trail created by the Communauté de communes Rahin et Chérimont. There are also a few remains of broken bricks, a small slag heap, a powder magazine and the old coal-mining railroad line that ran close to the pit.

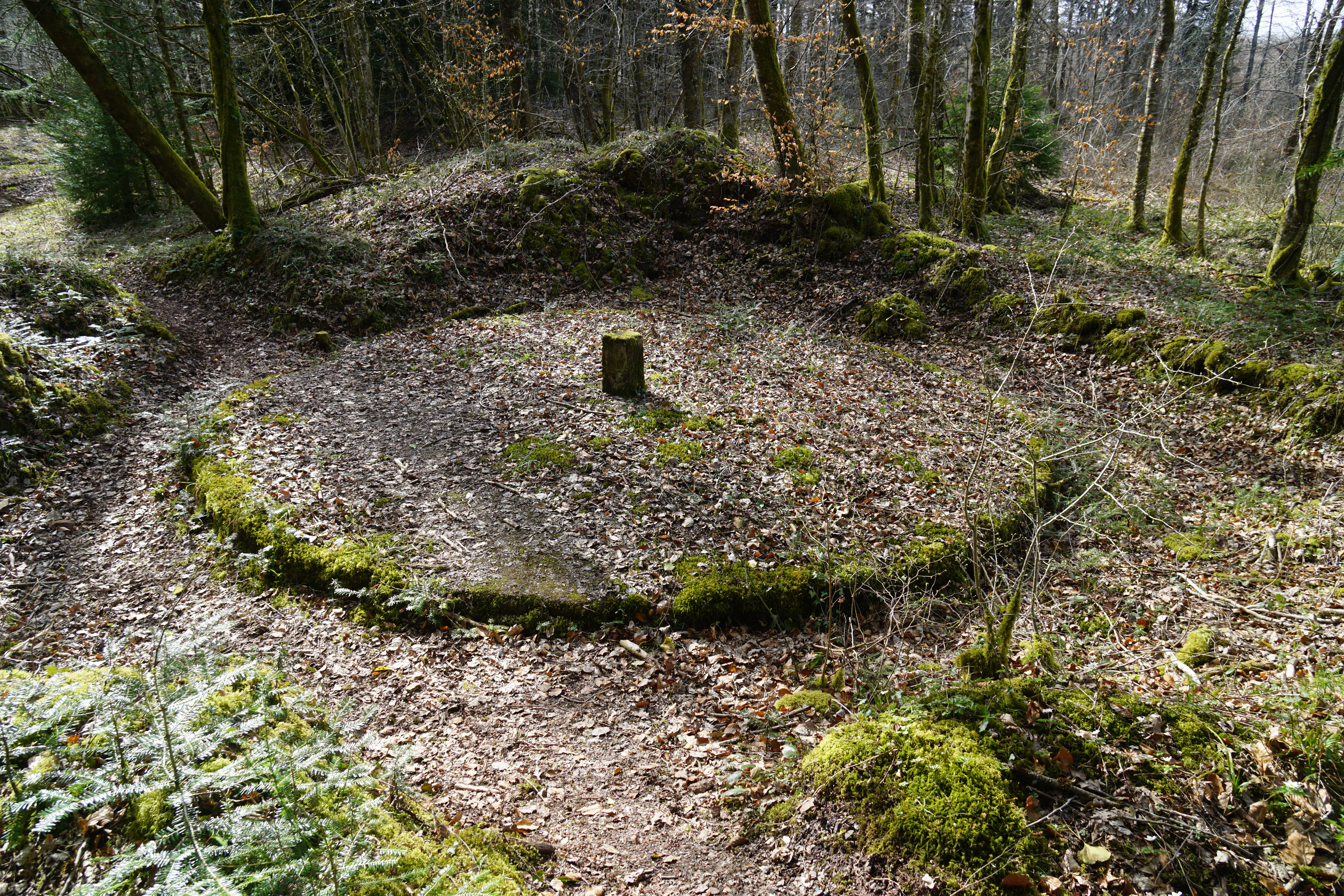
The Tonnet well slab.

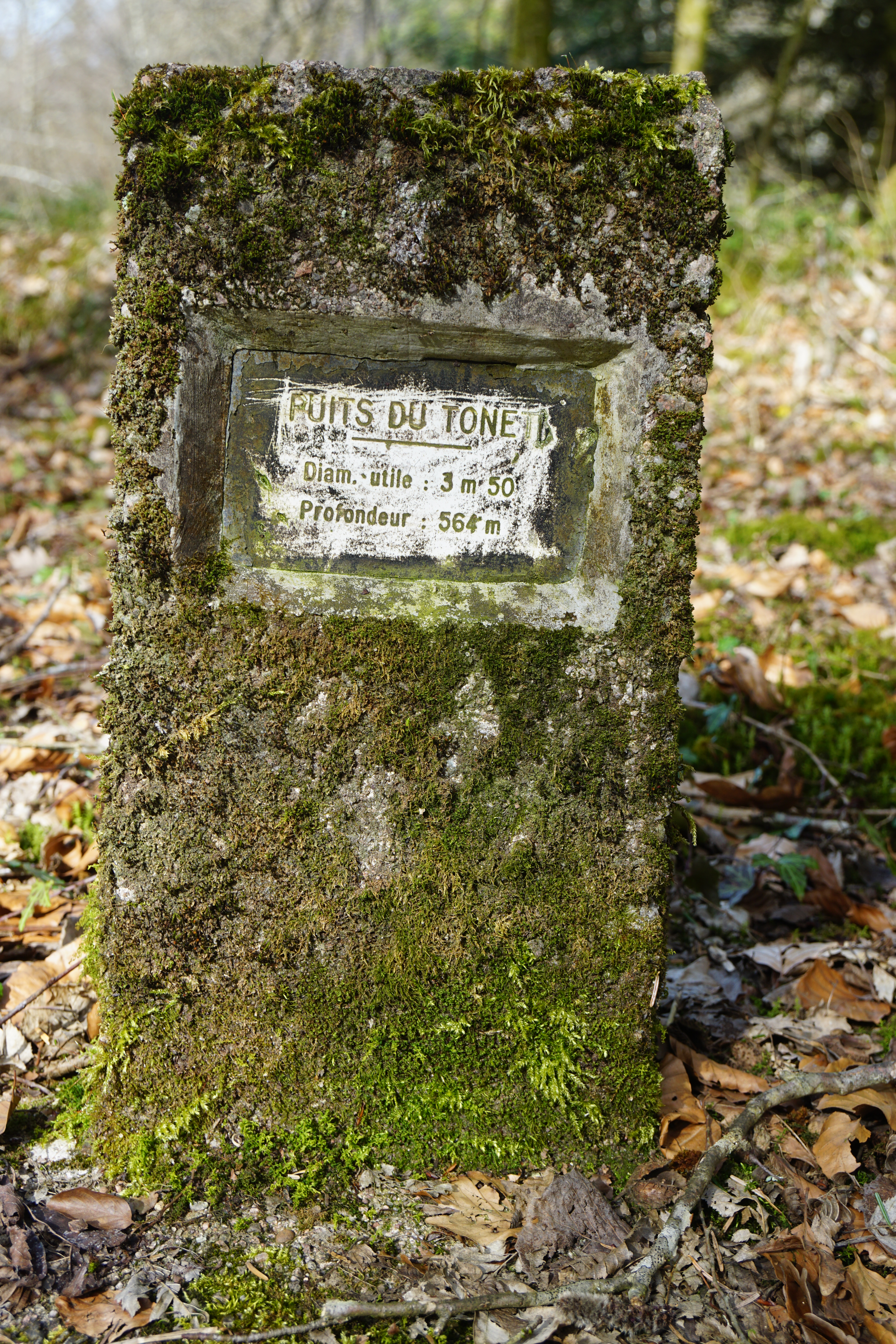
The milestone

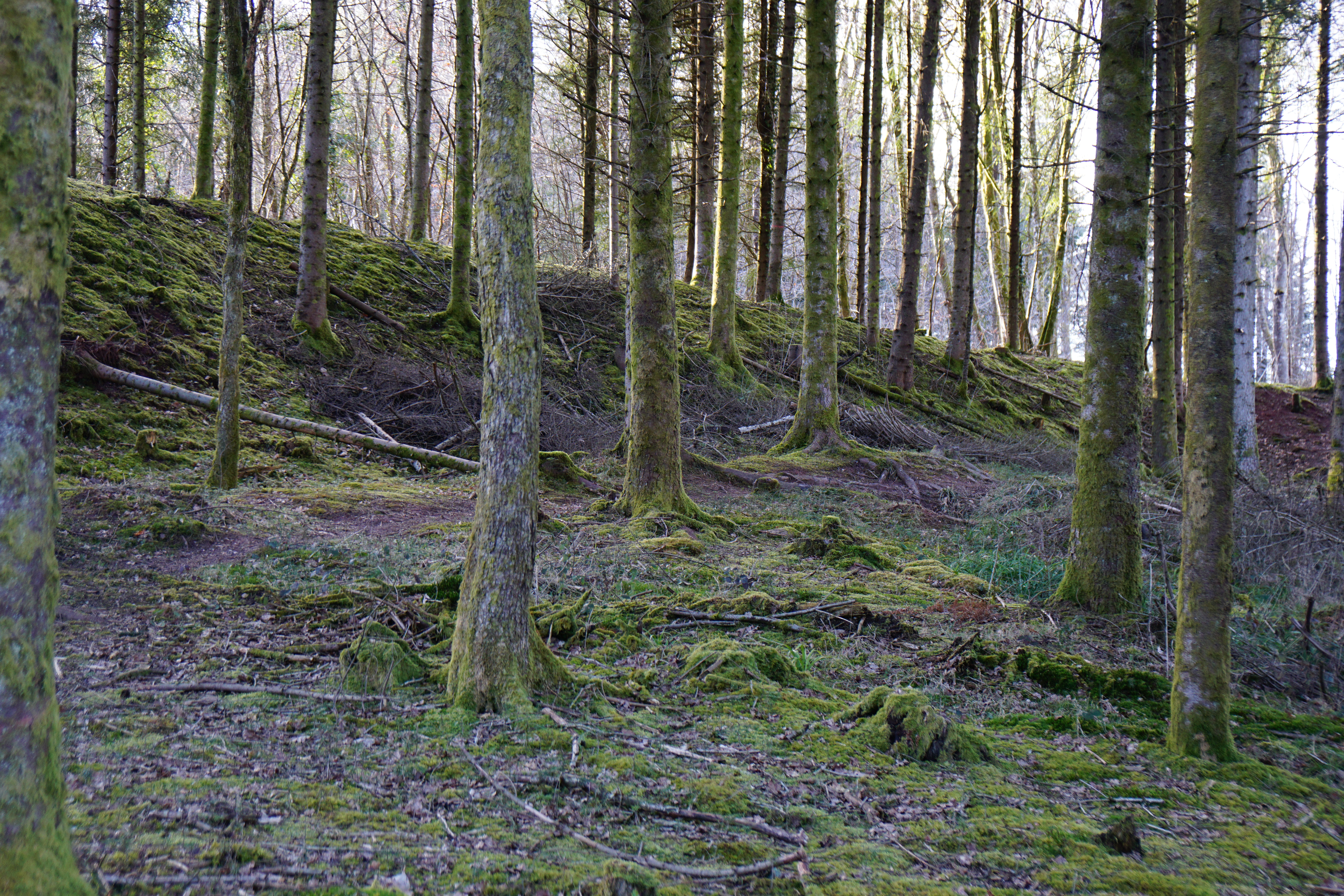
The slag heap

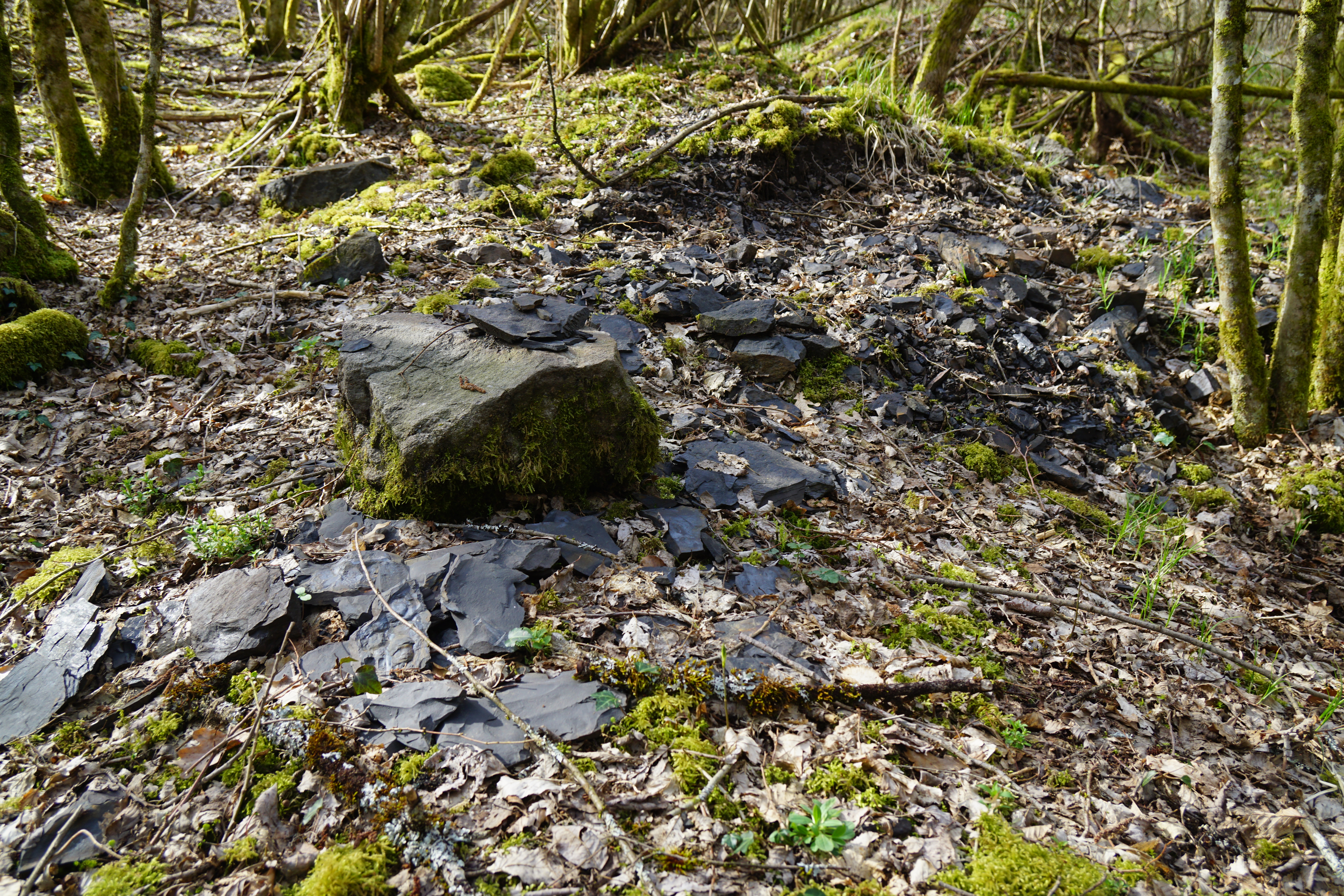
Schist

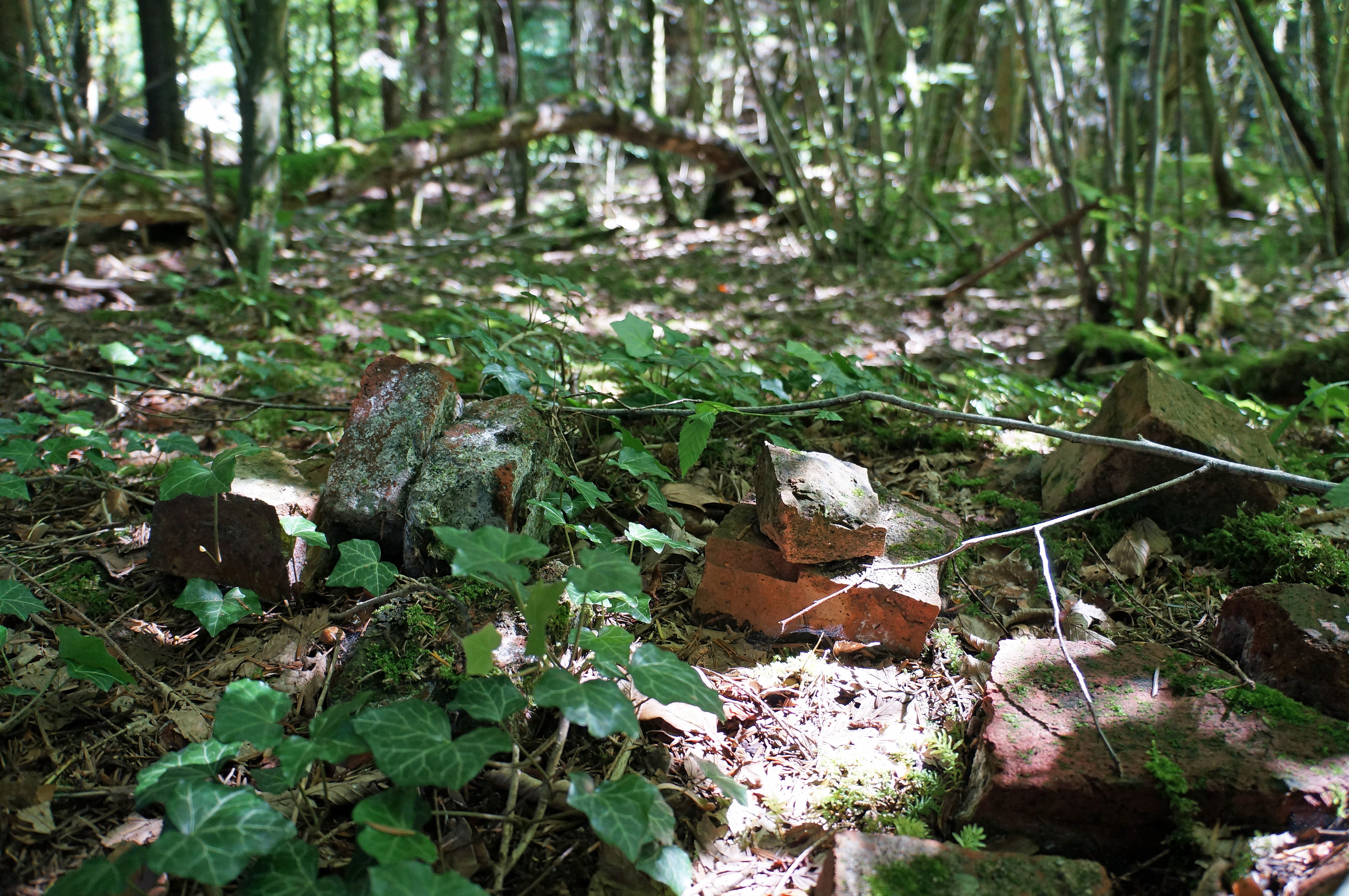
Remains of bricks

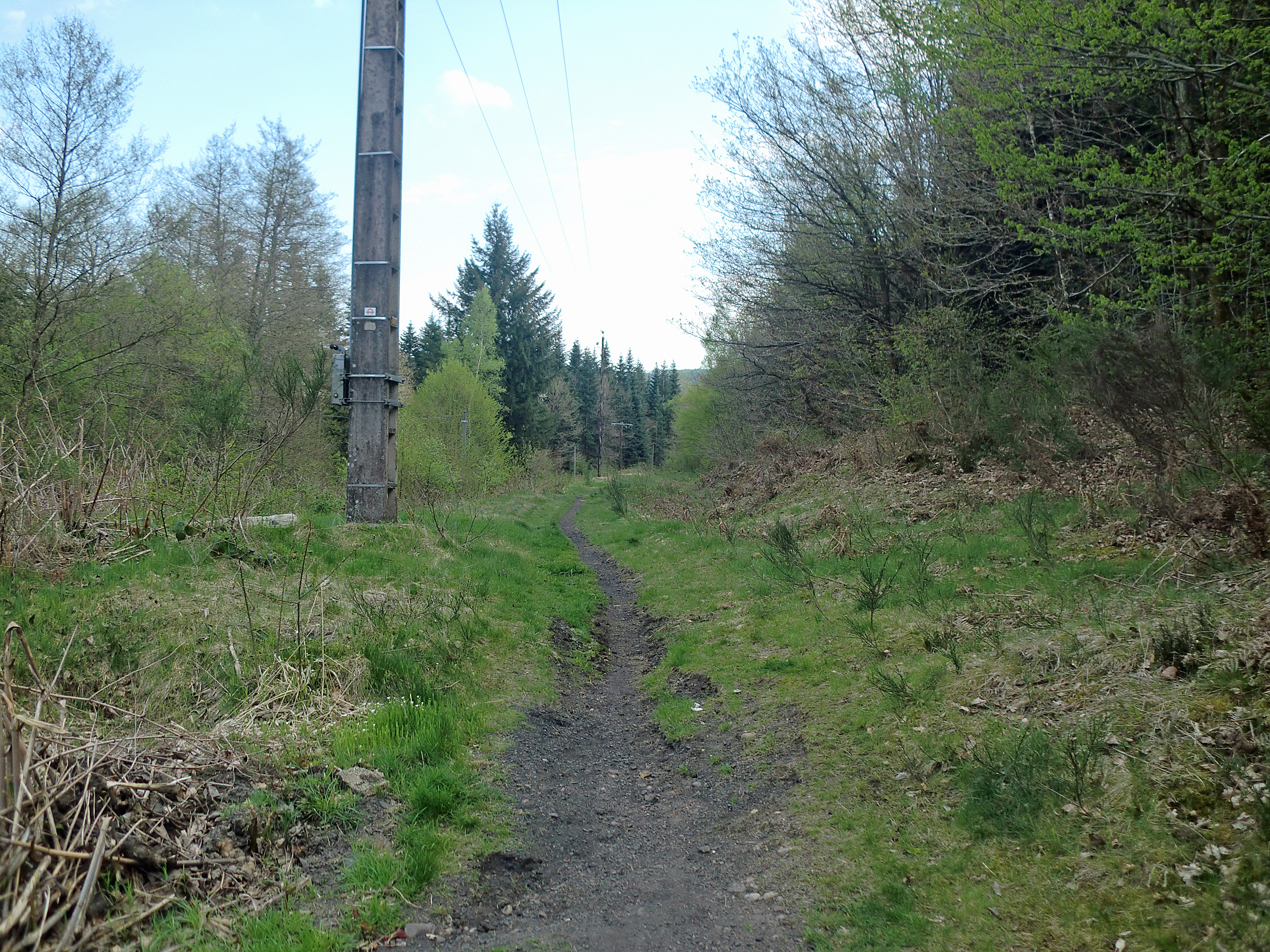
Old railroad

== Shaft n^{o}. 10 ==
47.705419°N 6.642512°E

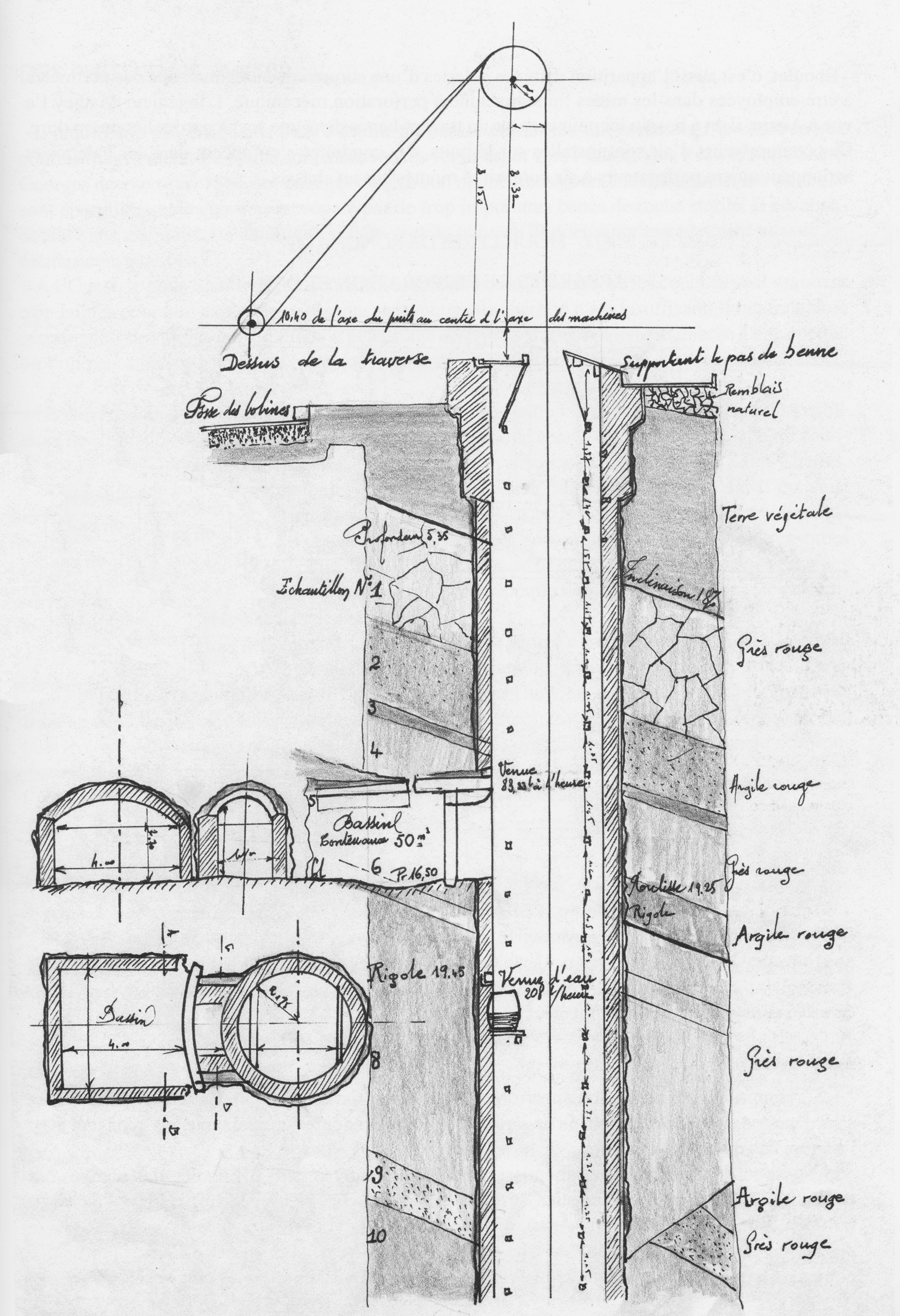
Sectional drawing of shaft n^{o}. 10

The decision to sink shaft no. 10 was taken on May 29, 1880, to replace shaft no. 7, which had been backfilled eight years earlier. Sinking began in 1884 with a diameter of 4 meters, its purpose being to become the ventilation shaft for the Saint-Charles shaft, but with the ulterior motive that it might become a new extraction shaft for the second coal seam left untapped in the outcrop region. The first coal seam was encountered at a depth of 185 meters. Two further layers were encountered at 215 and 222 meters. Shaft sinking finally stopped at 225 meters from the surface.

It was not completed when the 1886 firedamp explosion at Saint-Charles killed 23 people. It was not connected to the shaft until the following June 24, when it was fitted with a fan. After the closure of Saint-Charles in 1896, like the Sainte-Marie shaft, it was left open to allow any gases to escape, and was surrounded by a 2.50-metre-high perimeter wall until the mines closed. In 1958, the wall was demolished and the shaft backfilled with shale before a concrete slab and bollard were poured. At the beginning of the 21st century, the well was covered by its concrete slab (and brambles) at the end of the Xi 30 well cul-de-sac.

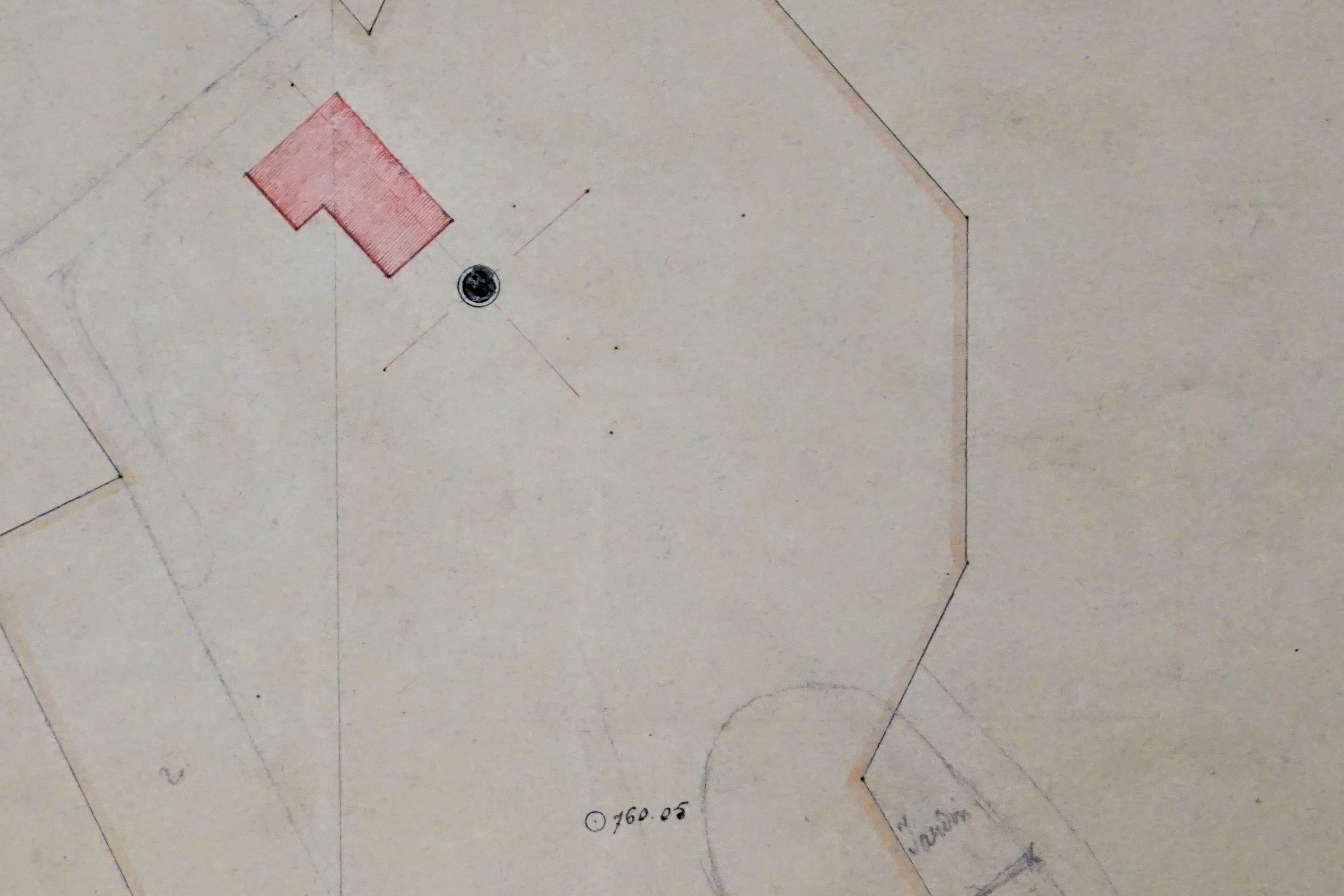
Ground plan of shaft no. 10.

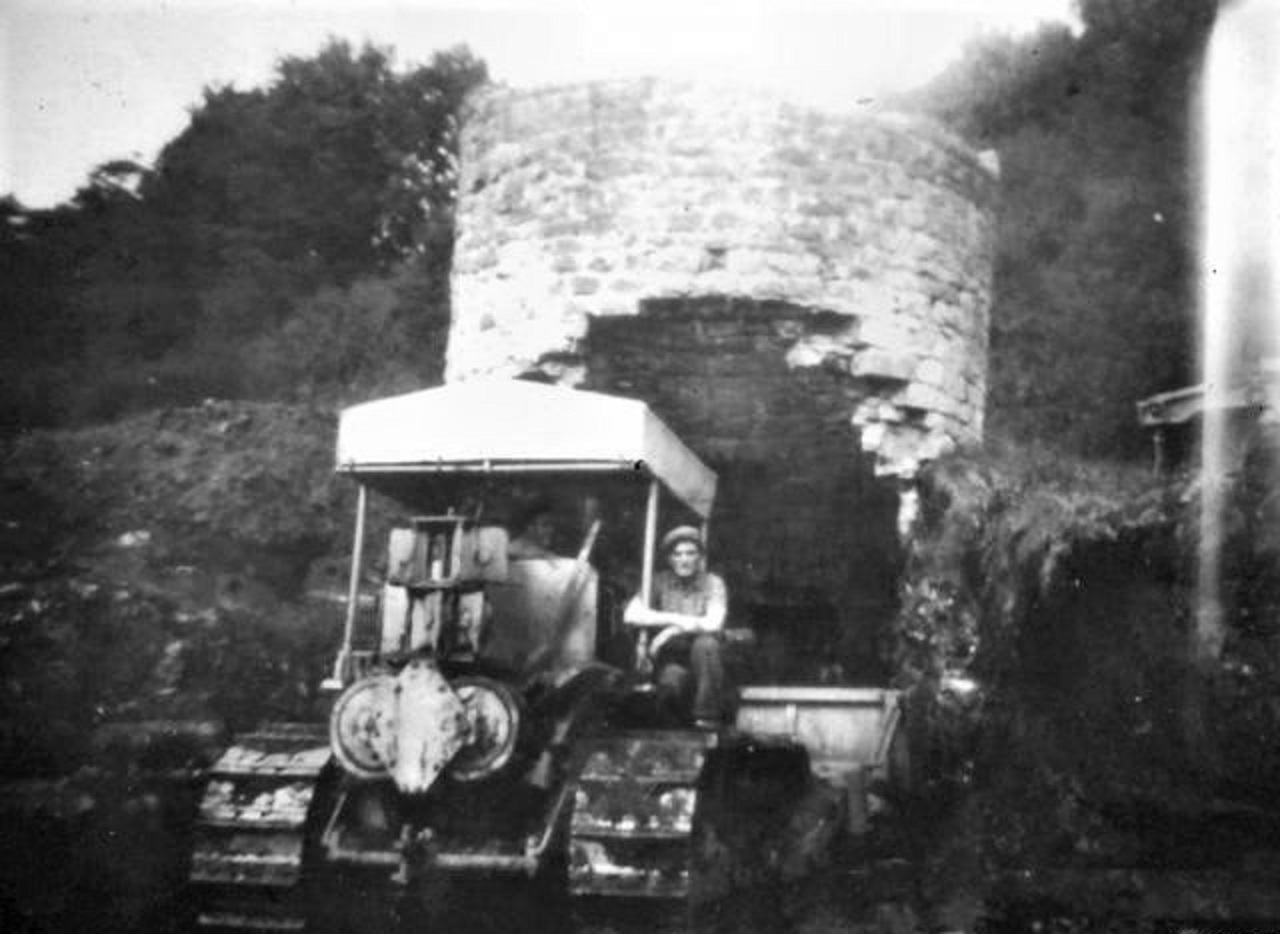
Backfilling the shaft

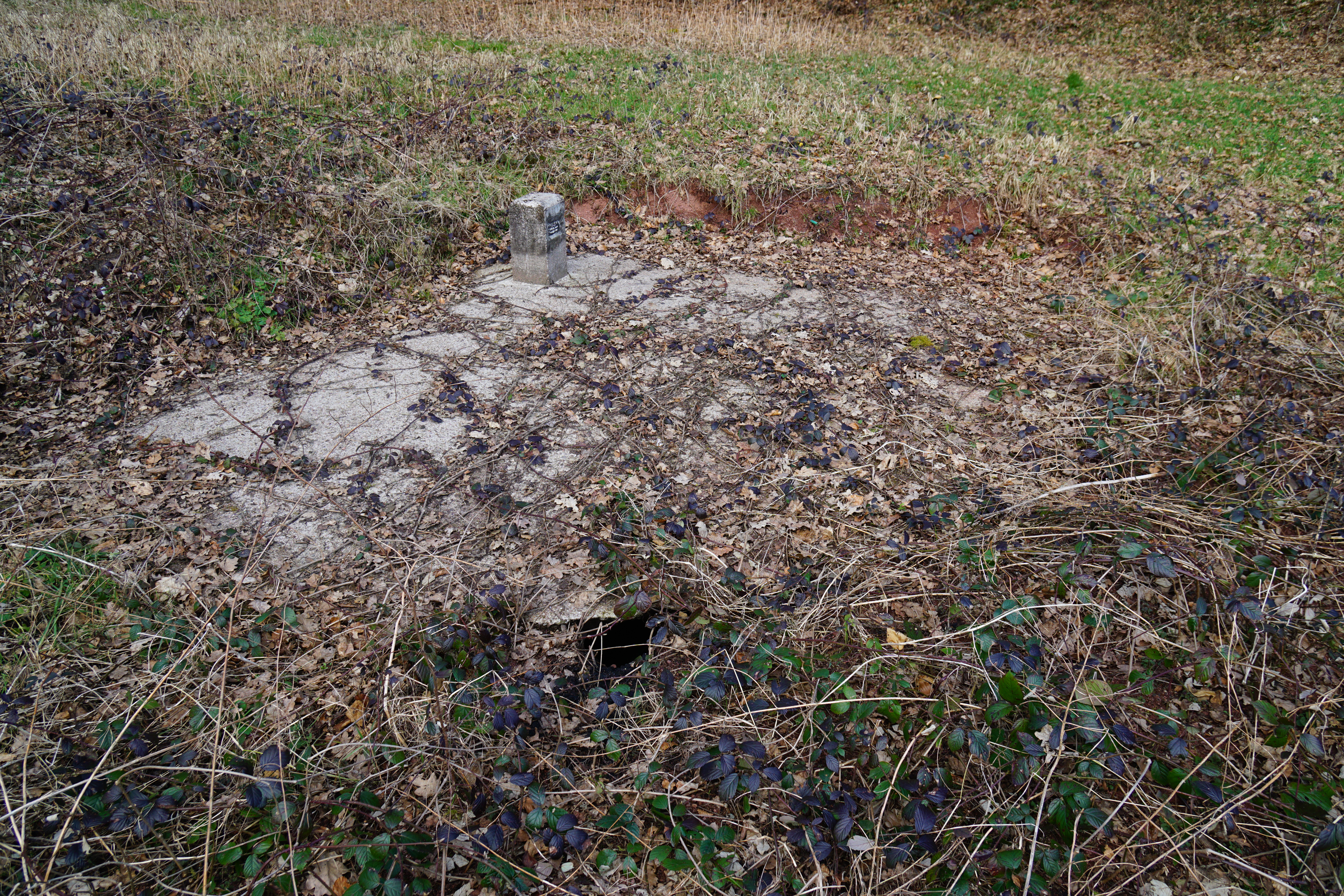
The slab of shaft no. 10.

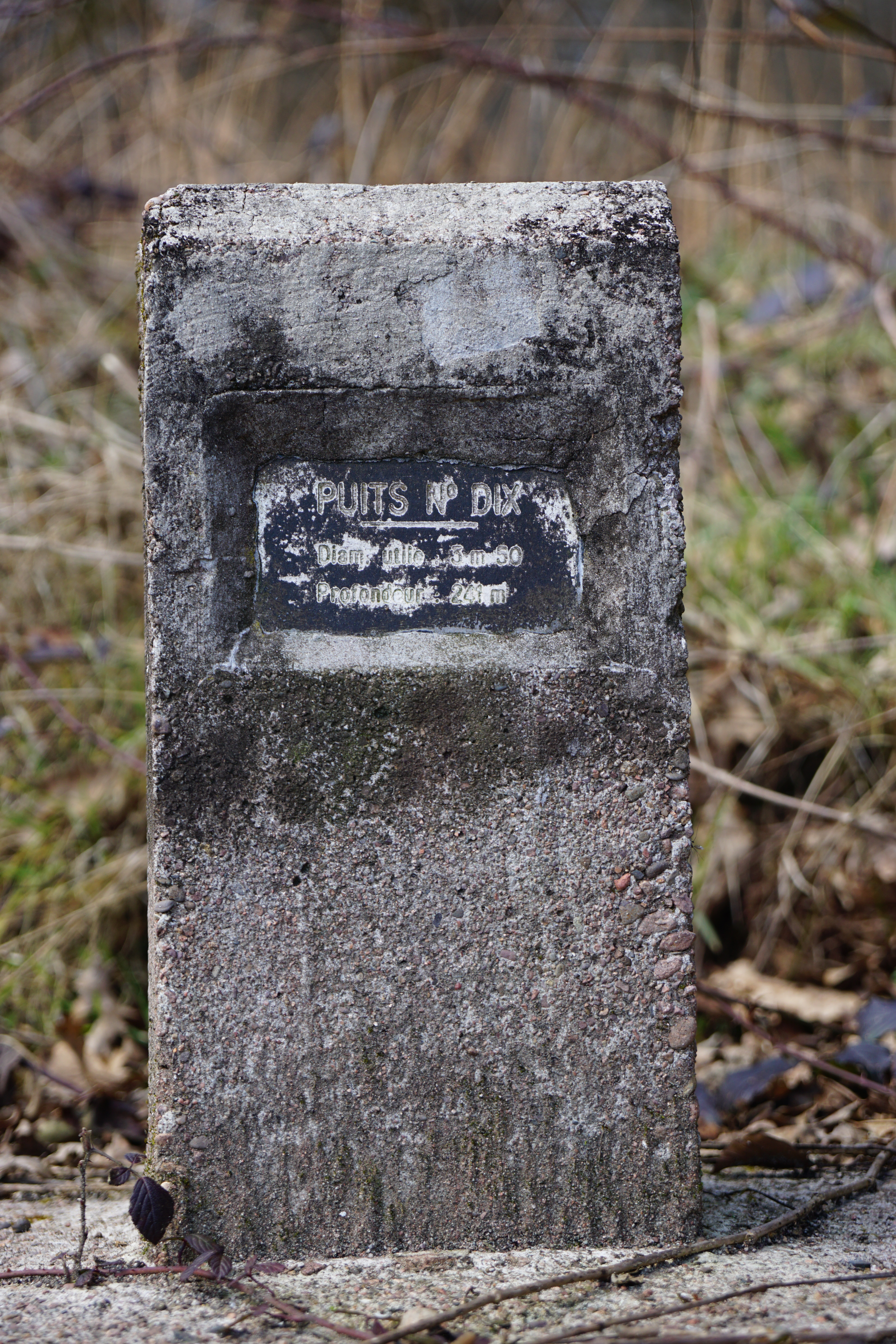
The milestone

== Puits Arthur-de-Buyer / n^{o} 11 ==
47.677012°N 6.614263°E

The Arthur-de-Buyer shaft was sunk as early as 1894 to secure the future of the Ronchamp mining company. The project was led by Léon Poussigue, director of the collieries since 1891, who was responsible for supervising the excavation work, designing the buildings and installing each machine. The head office is named after Arthur de Buyer, President of the company since 1876, who retired when the pit was put into operation. (Note: Quoting from the minutes of the Board of Directors: “The new seat no. 11 will be called the Arthur-de-Buyer seat, to give its president a new token of recognition.)

In operation from 1900 until the early 1950s, its depth was 1,010 meters, making it the deepest mine shaft in France at the beginning of the 20th century and the first to exceed the depth of 1,000 meters. After attempting to mine uranium after the World War II, it underwent several attempts at reconversion before falling into ruin at the beginning of the 21st century. A project to install a photovoltaic solar power plant by the municipality has been under study since June 2012.

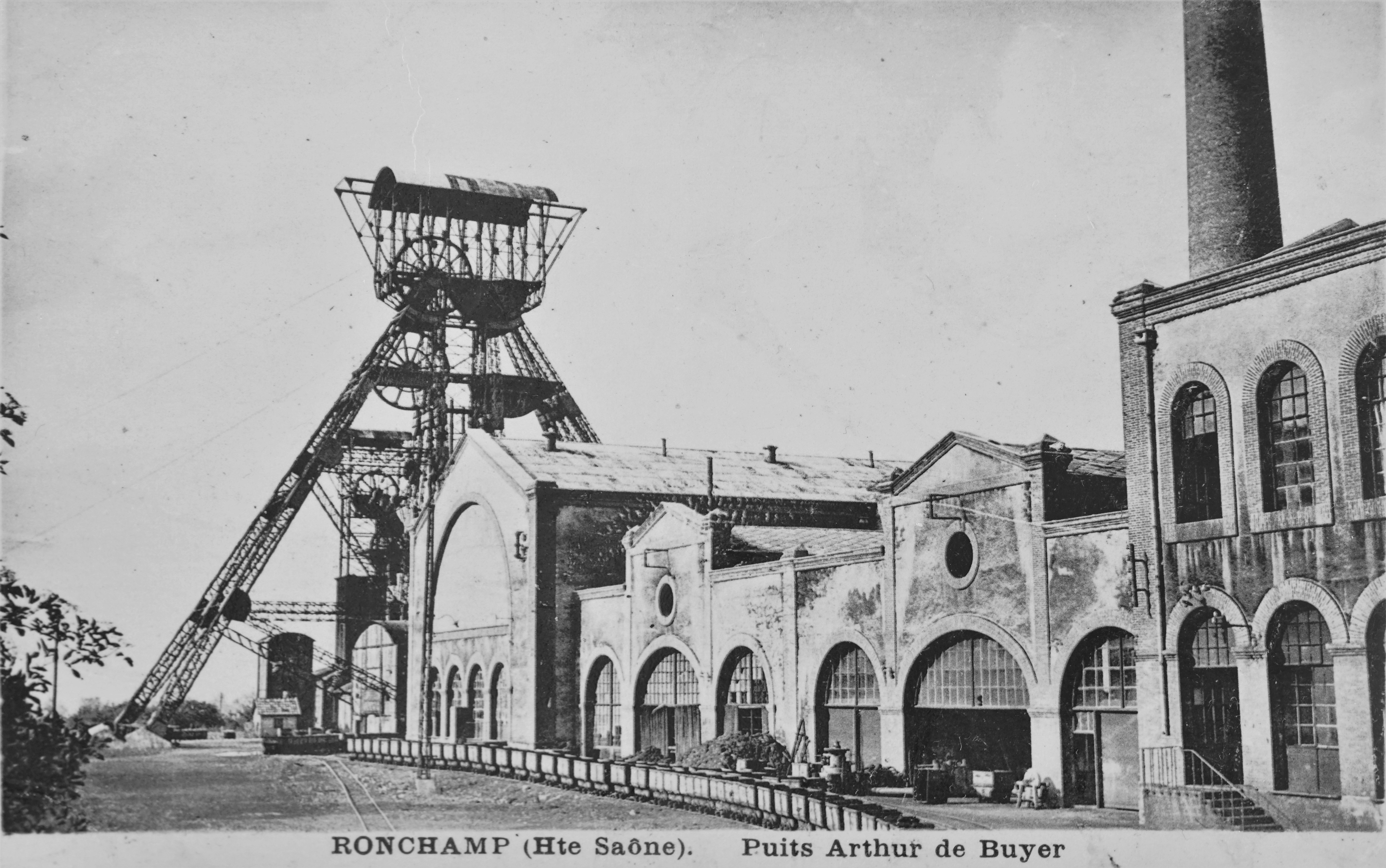
The Arthur-de-Buyer well between the wars

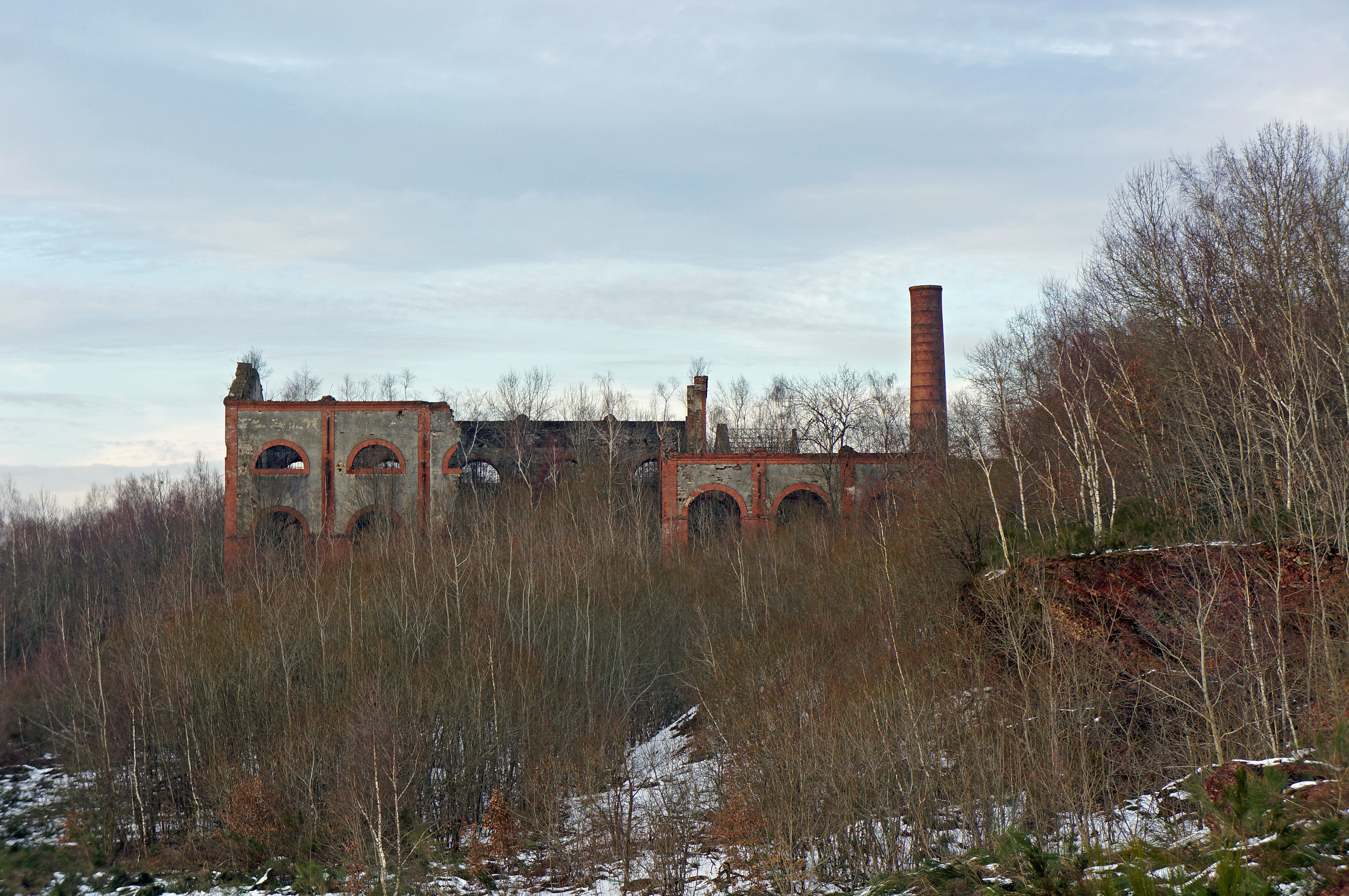
The ruined Arthur-de-Buyer well buildings

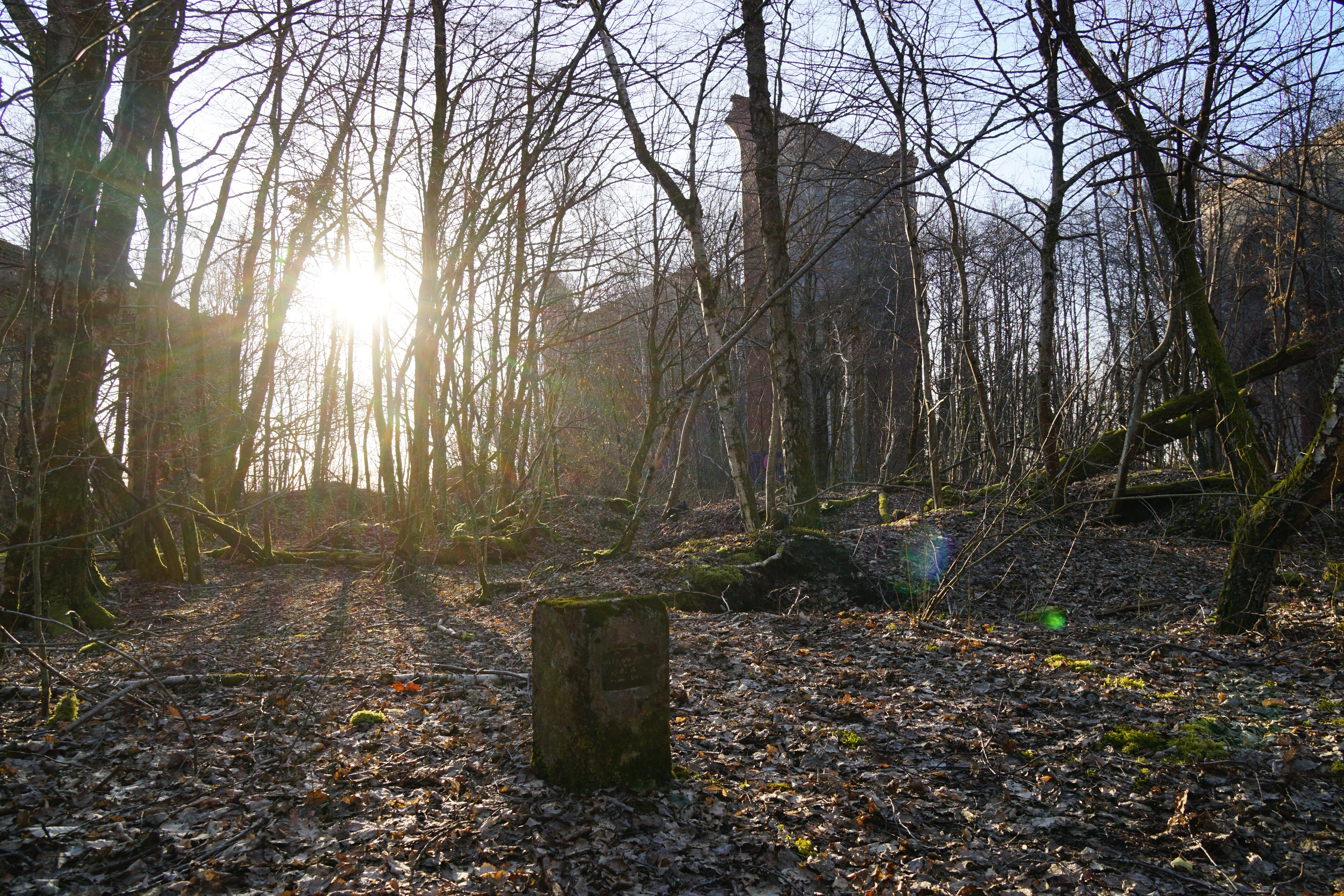
The slab of shaft A

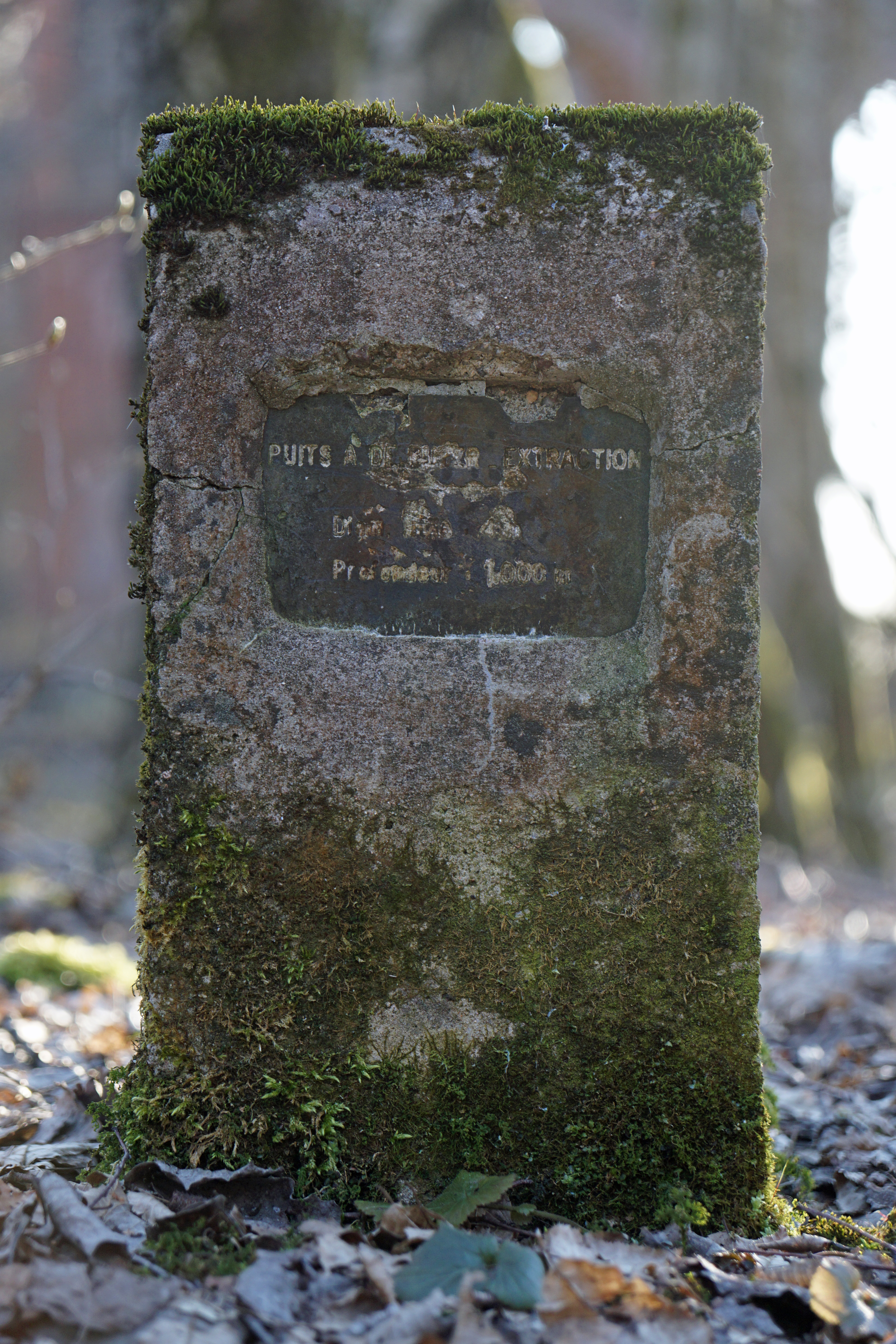
The A shaft terminal

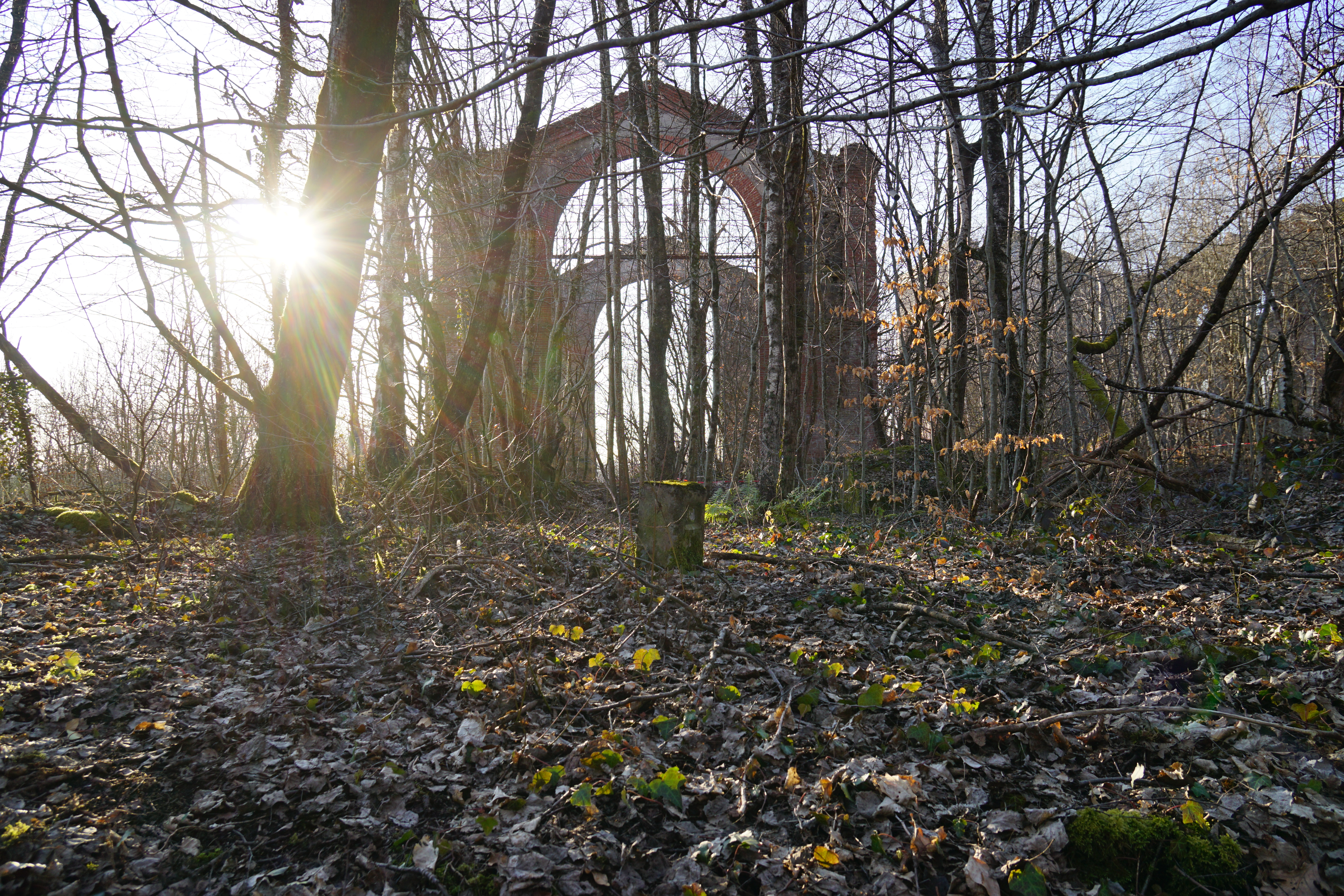
The slab of shaft B

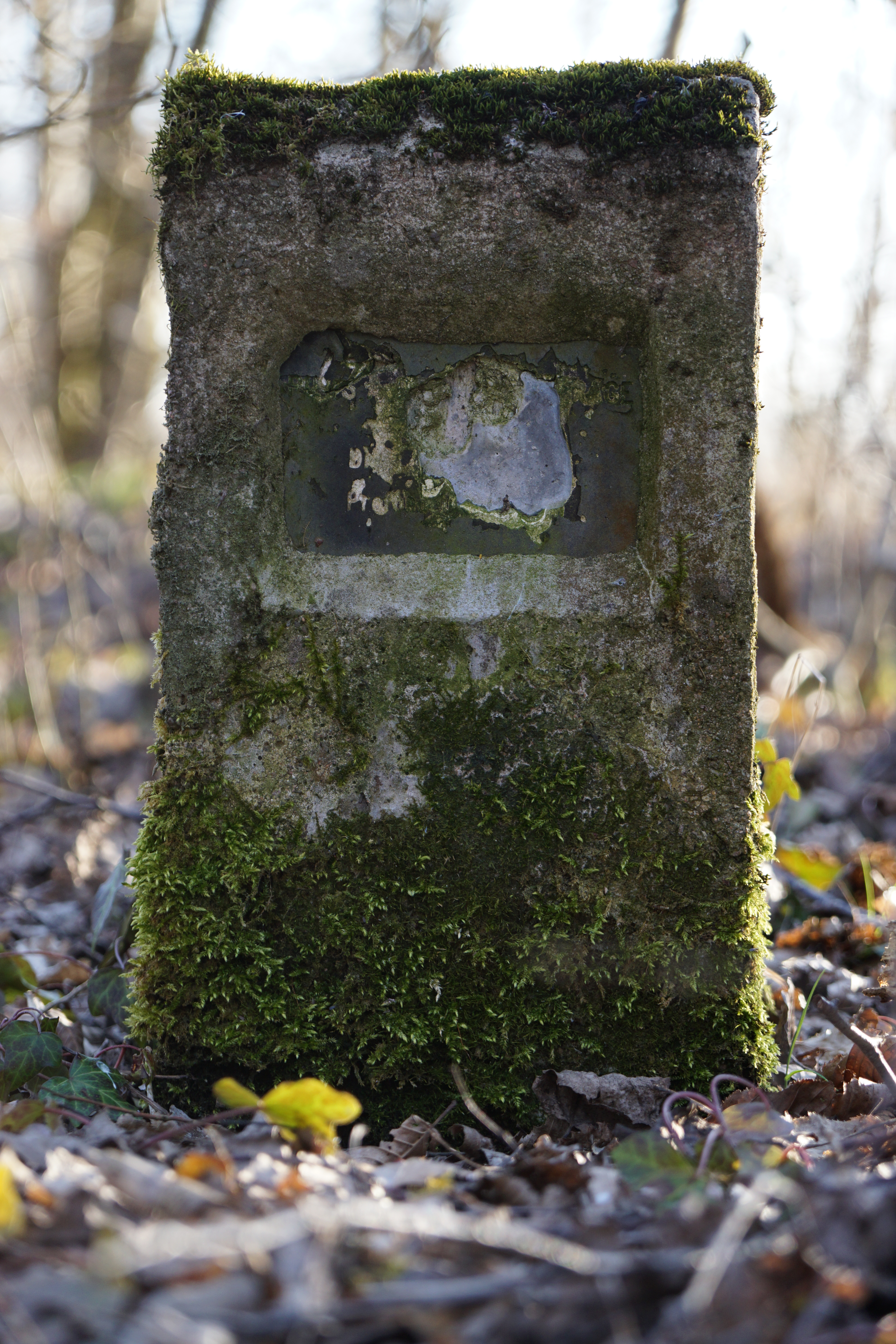
Shaft milestone B

== Étançon shaft / n^{o} 13 bis ==
47.709047°N 6.646055°E

The Etançon shaft is the only shaft in the coalfield dug in the 20th century, and also the only one dug by Électricité de France. It operated from 1950 to 1958, when the outcrops were brought back into production. By extending mining for a further ten years, it made it easier for miners to retrain. After closure, the site was abandoned, before being incorporated into the outcrop footpath in 1997. From 1999 to 2000, the site was cleared by an association, before becoming a tourist site at the beginning of the 21st century.

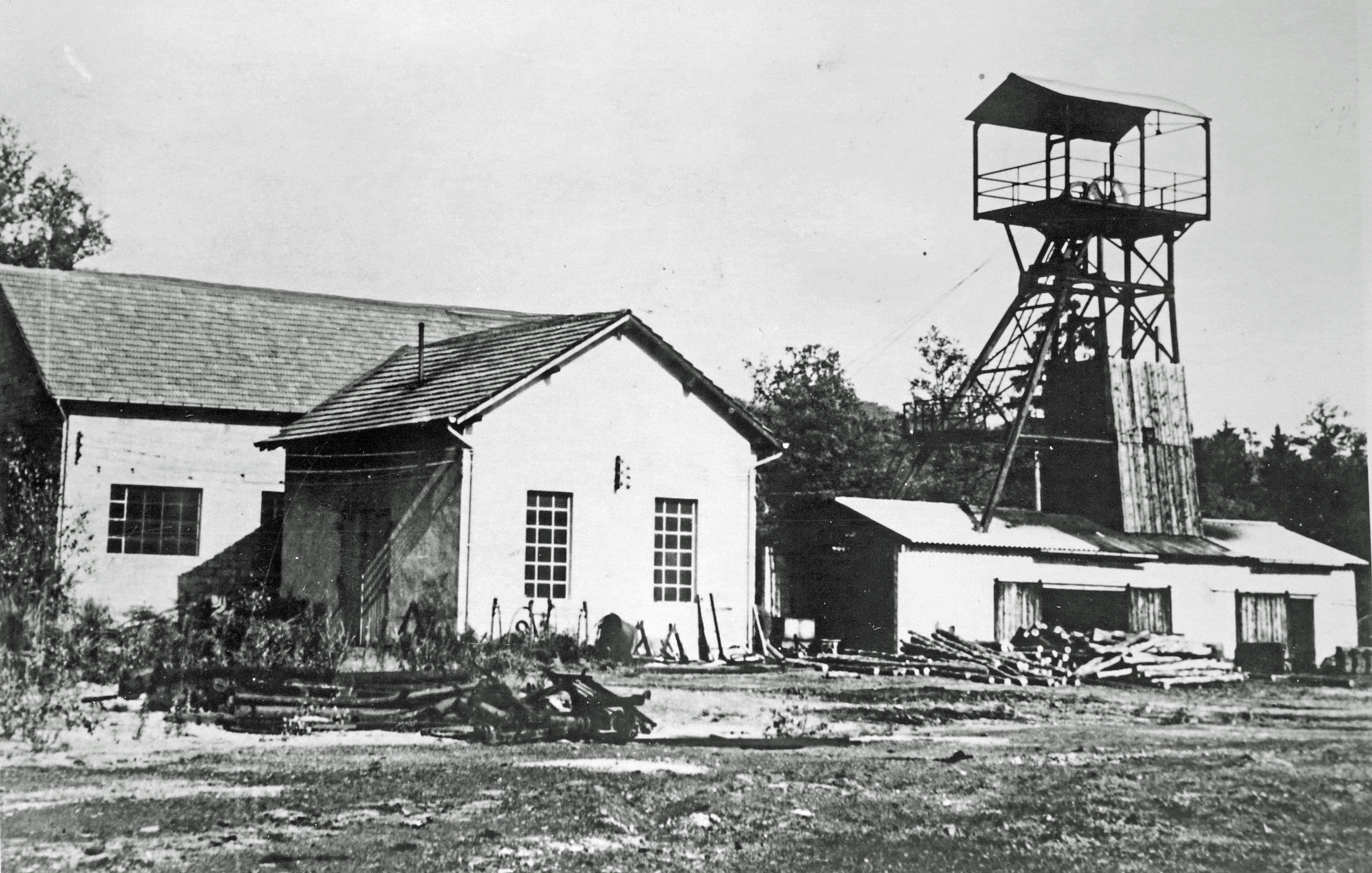
The active shaft.

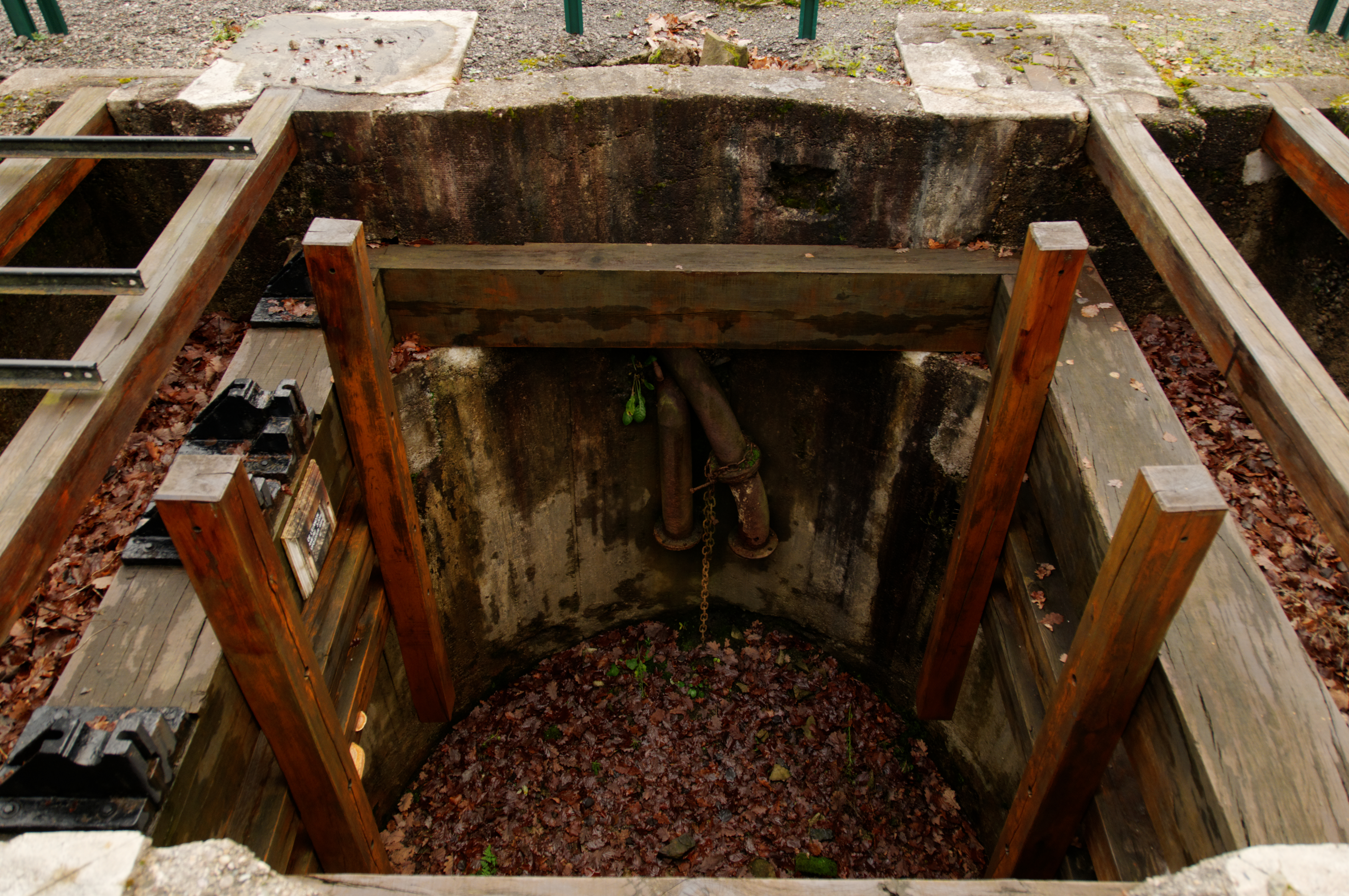
The shaft opening.

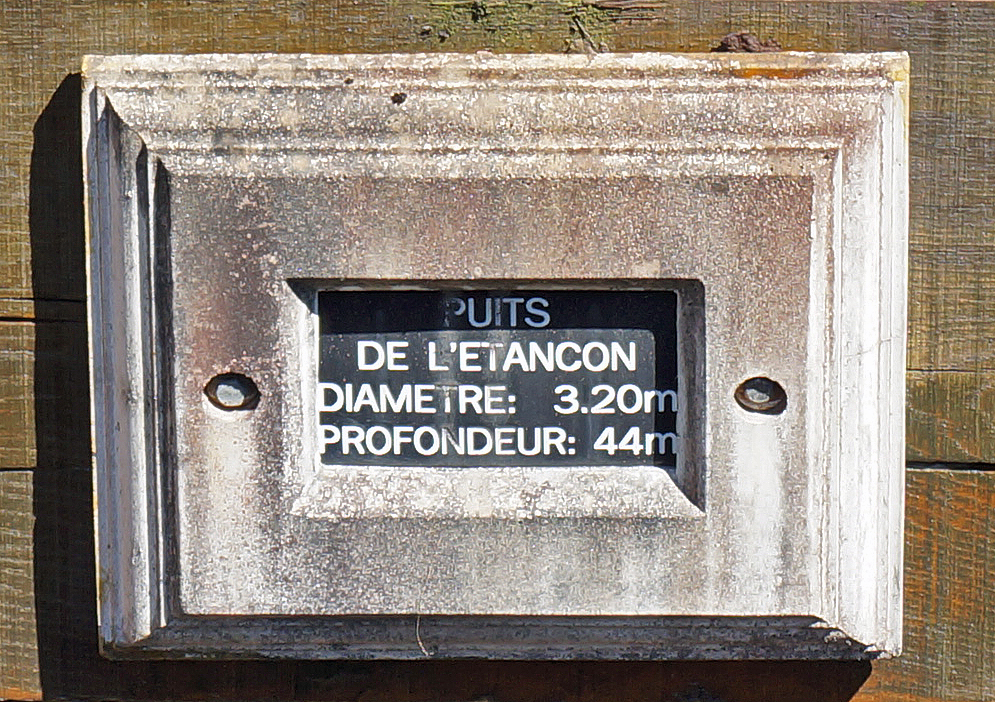
Inscriptions on the Etançon well.

== Internal shafts ==
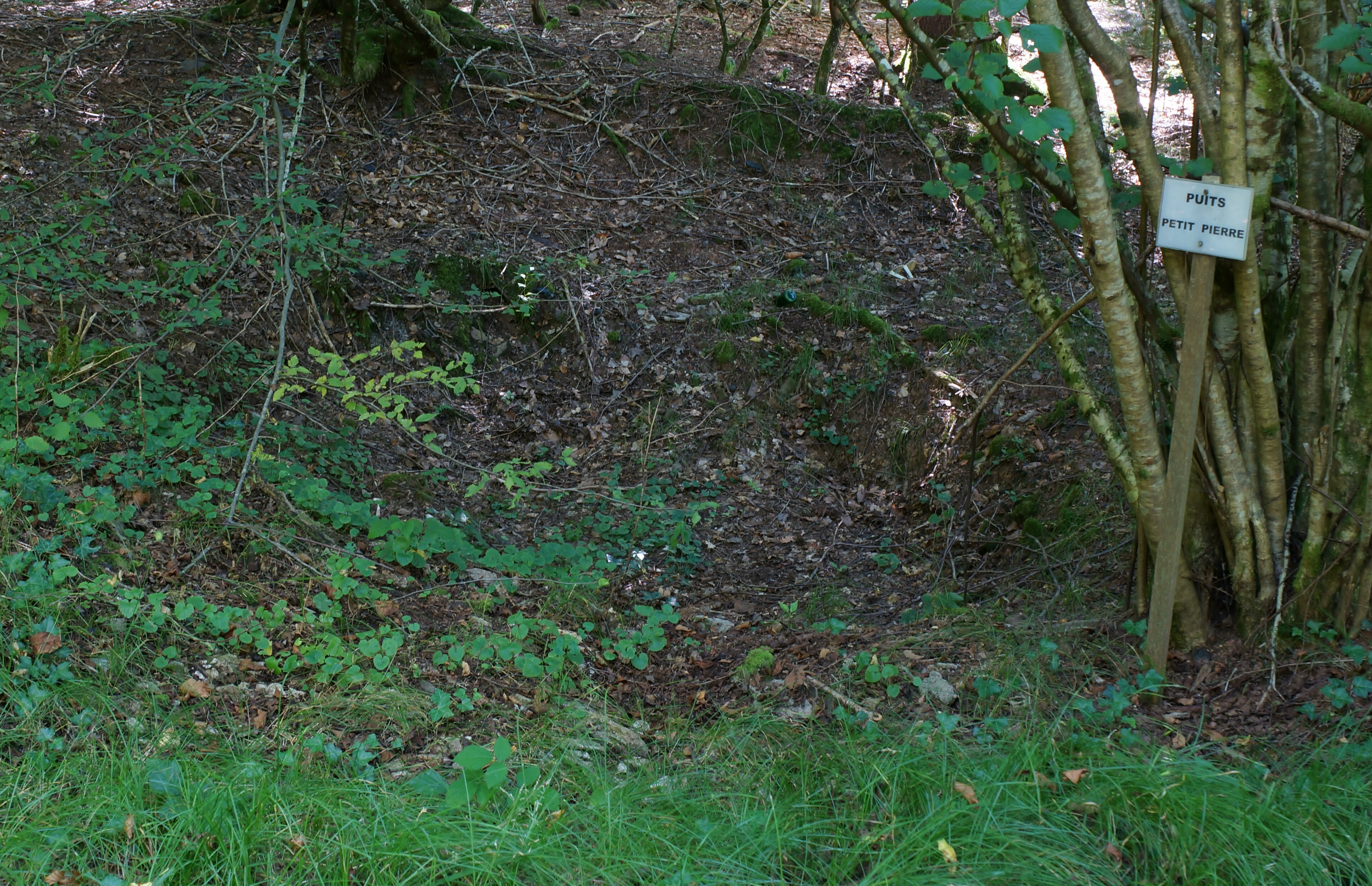
Funnel-shaped hole marking the location of the Petit-Pierre well

Bures are small internal shafts dug from the galleries, some of which open out onto the surface. In Ronchamp, there were around ten of them, all dug before the hamlet of La Houillère was abandoned. Some examples include: puits Petit-Pierre, puits du Cheval (no. 1 and no. 2), puits du Chevanel, puits Greniguey, puits Saint-François-Xavier (used as a link between the galeries du Clocher and du Sentier), puits Saint-Antoine, puits Pallin and puits de la Bascule.

== Boreholes and research shaft ==
Many mining companies and industrial groups have carried out a wide range of drilling and exploration work for coal (hillside galleries, shafts or surface searches) in the Ronchamp and Champagney coalfields and beyond, particularly to the south and east of the known deposit, in the direction of the Territoire de Belfort and Alsace.) Most of these investigations were unsuccessful, while others led to the opening of small-scale mining operations. Other projects were abandoned before reaching the coalfields, usually for financial reasons.

=== Ronchamp concession ===
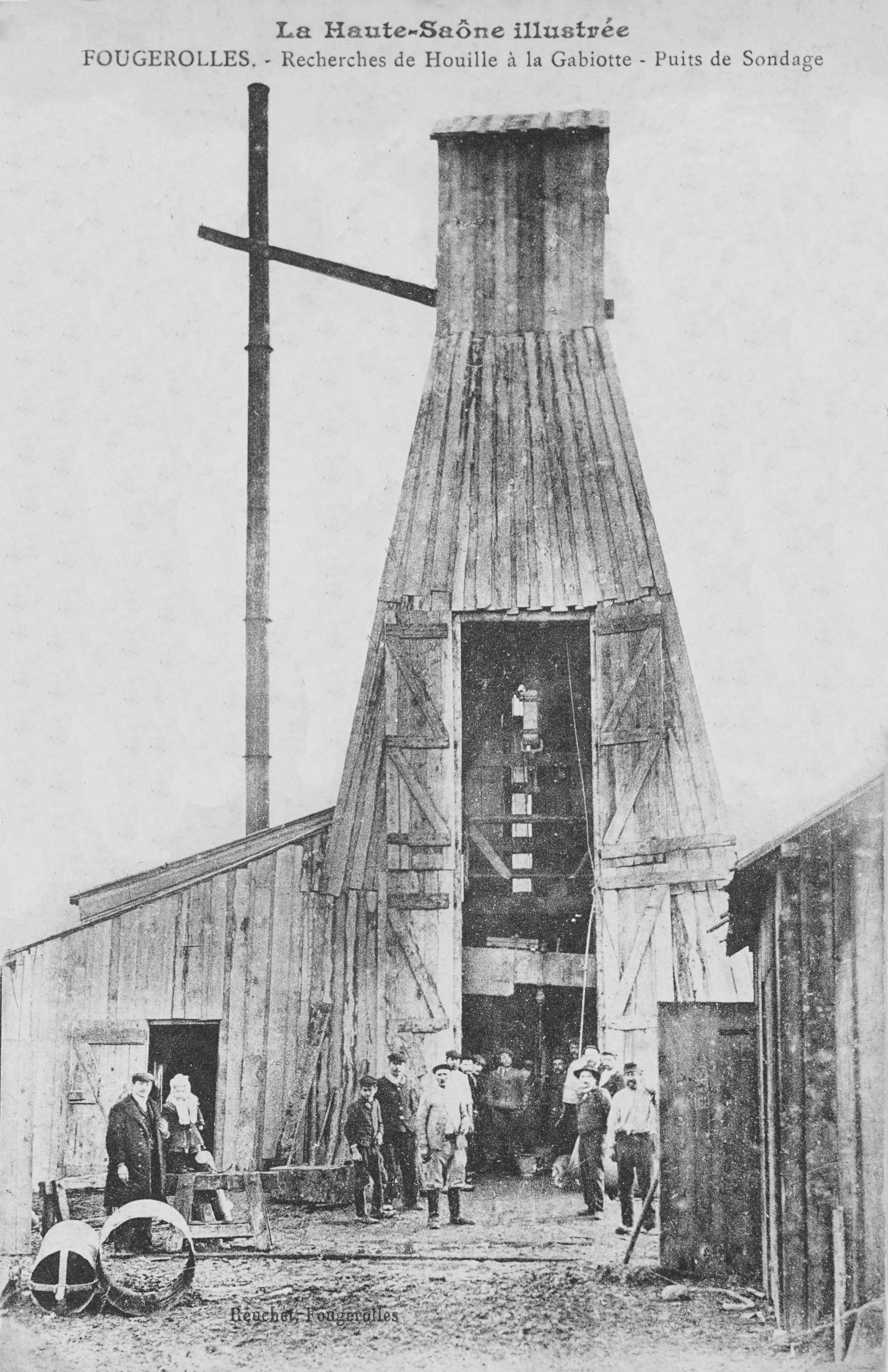
Example of a survey round (La Gabiotte)

The Ronchamp concession was granted on September 11, 1757. The concession changed owners several times during its lifetime, merging with the Champagney concession in 1763 and the Éboulet concession in 1866. Several drillings were carried out on this concession, particularly during the 19th century.

- Rougegoutte borehole (1822) at 270 meters depth.
- Chevanel Est borehole (1825), prefigured shaft no. 1 with two layers at a depth of 141.63 meters: the first being 1.5 meters thick and the second being 0.9 meters thick.
- Chevanel Ouest hole (1825) at 162.4 meters depth.
- Colline de Bourlémont sounding (1830), encountered with a coalfield.
- La Prairie sounding (1831).
- Champagney sounding (1832) at 120 meters depth.
- Sondage × (1842), prefigured the Saint-Charles well.
- Pré de la Cloche borehole (1856–1859), prefigured the Magny shaft, a 1.7-meter layer is discovered at a depth of 648 meters.
- Theurey borehole (1866) at 228 meters depth.
- Frahier borehole (1870) at 580 meters depth.
- Étançon borehole (1949), prefigured the Étançon well.

=== Éboulet concession ===
The Société des Maîtres de Forges undertook several works to obtain the Éboulet concession, starting with the Éboulet borehole, dug between 1847 and 1851, which showed positive results, foreshadowing the Notre-Dame shaft. The L'Est shaft, dug in 1856 and abandoned at a depth of seven meters, was dug solely to force the Ronchamp collieries to dig the Espérance shaft in marshy ground. The L'Ouest shaft, dug the same year not far from the future Magny shaft, was abandoned at a depth of three meters.

=== Mourière concession ===
The Mourière concession was granted on October 25, 1766 to the Prince de Bauffremont, who did not mine coal. On May 22, 1844, the concession was granted to Sieur Grézely fils, associated with Sieurs Conrad et consorts. A single borehole was drilled by this company near the village of Malbouhans. The result was negative at a depth of 374 meters.

=== Lomont concession ===
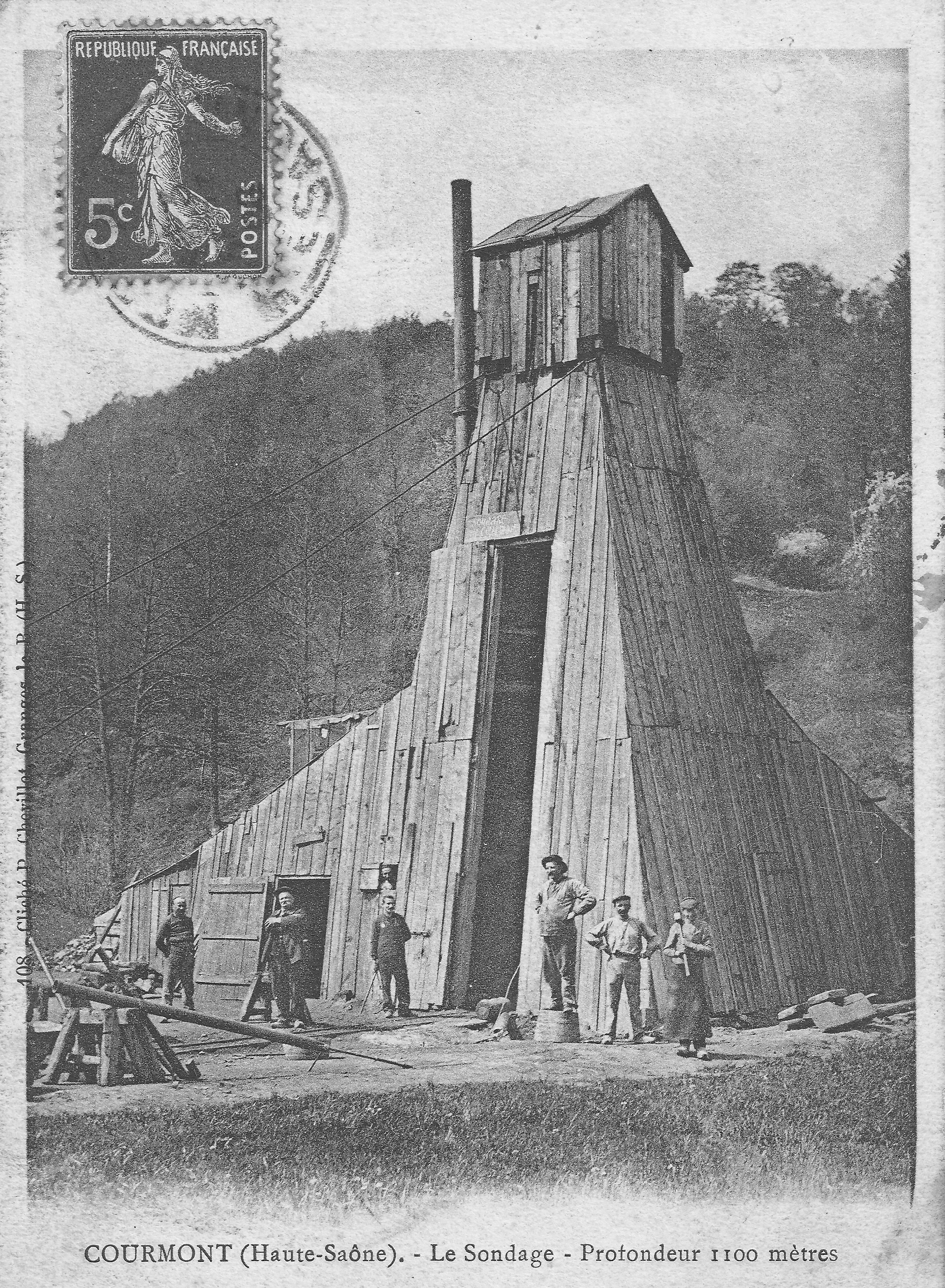
The Courmont survey

The Lomont concession was awarded in 1904 to the Japy company, which undertook several deep boreholes between the villages of Magny-Danigon and Courmont.

- Sounding at Moulin du Faux.
- Pissotte sounding, negative result at 1,072 meters.
- Belverne borehole, negative result at 899 meters.
- Lomont borehole, four coal seams at 1,106 meters.
- Courmont borehole, negative result at 1,068 meters.

=== Society of Engineers ===
The Société des Ingénieurs was created in the 1850s, while the two Ronchamp mining companies and the maîtres de forge were competing for the Éboulet concession. Three boreholes were drilled by this company.

- Chaux borehole (1856), unsuccessful at a depth of 103 meters.
- Clairegoutte borehole (1856), unfinished at 258 meters depth.
- Chatelaie borehole (1856), negative result at 600 meters depth.

=== Nearby farms in Haute-Saône ===
A concession and numerous exploration projects are located in the commune of Vy-lès-Lure, to the south-west of the Saint-Germain concession, which is the nearest. Other older and smaller workings are carried out in the Athesans and Gouhenans concessions. These three concessions and the Saulnot concession (dating from the 16th century) were combined by presidential decree on March 14, 1879.

=== Others ===
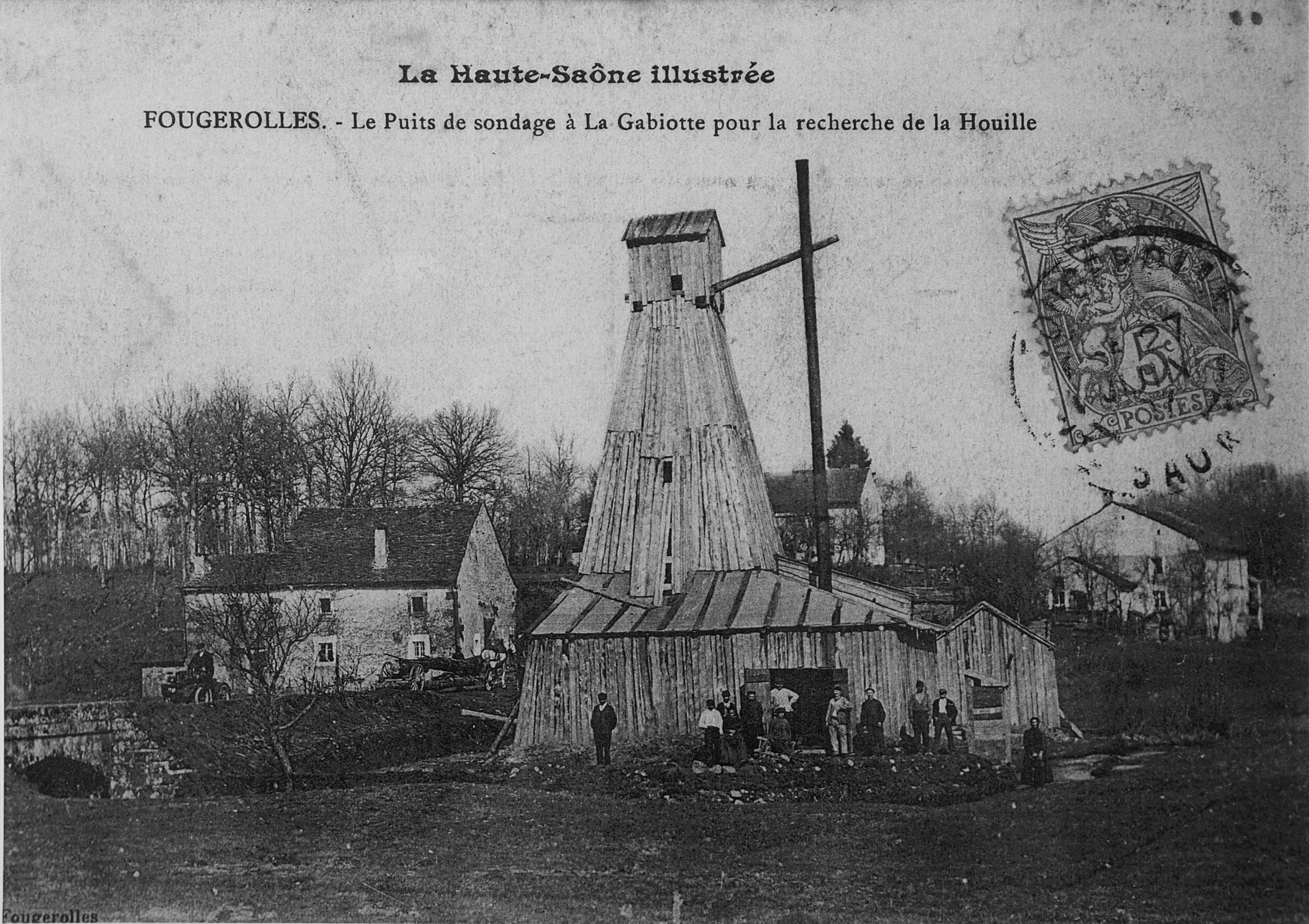
The Gabiotte survey

Other companies and private owners undertook surveys and other work, often far removed from the existing concessions around Ronchamp, such as the Compagnie Départemental du Haut-Rhin, which carried out numerous surveys between 1822 and 1832 in the southern Haut-Rhin, part of which later became the Territoire de Belfort, and in the Vallée de Villé.

- Research at Chenebier (18th century), anthracite discovered.
- Granges-Godey survey in Plancher-Bas (1821), unexploited coal seams, identified by two shafts 33.53 meters and 54.86 meters deep and by galleries undertaken by a Belfort company.
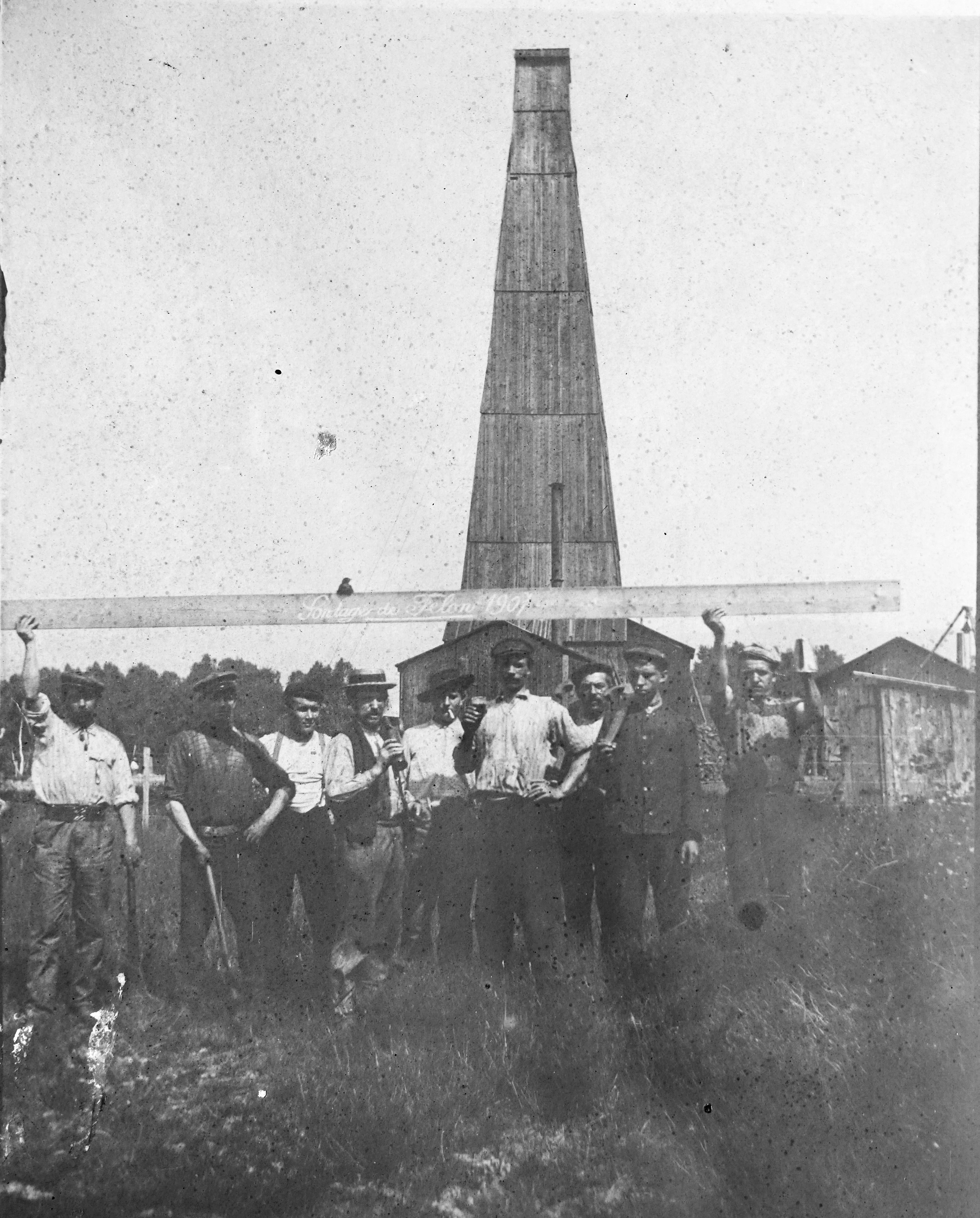
  The Felon survey
- Work at Anjoutey and Roppe (1775 then 1840), coal nets.
- Work in Arsot forest with a shaft and several galleries mining coal lenses.
- Work at Étueffont and Romagny, outcrops and a 30-meter-deep shaft.
- Le Champ sounding (1838) at Fougerolles.
- Errevet borehole, dug by owners from Moselle, with inconclusive results.
- Wittelsheim borehole, near Mulhouse by Gewerkschaft Amélie (1904), no trace of coal, but a potash deposit at a depth of 500 to 600 meters.
- Felon borehole (1907), coal is discontinuous and unusable at a depth of 700 meters.
- Gabiotte borehole (1906) at Fougerolles.

== See also ==
- Ronchamp coal mines
- Mining in France
- Sainte-Barbe Coal Mine
- Cokerie-lavoir du Chanois
- Saint-Charles shaft

== Bibliography ==
- Parietti, Jean-Jacques (2001). Les Houillères de Ronchamp vol. I: La mine. Éditions Comtoises. ISBN 2-914425-08-2.
- Parietti, Jean-Jacques (2010). Les Houillères de Ronchamp vol. II: Les mineurs, Noidans-lès-Vesoul, fc culture & patrimoine. ISBN 978-2-36230-001-1.
- Parietti, Jean-Jacques (1999a). Les dossiers de la Houillère 1: Le puits Sainte-Marie, Association des amis du musée de la mine.
- Parietti, Jean-Jacques (1999b). Les dossiers de la Houillère 2: Le puits Arthur de Buyer, Association des amis du musée de la mine.
- Parietti, Jean-Jacques (1999c). Les dossiers de la Houillère 3: Le puits Saint Charles, Association des amis du musée de la mine.
- Parietti, Jean-Jacques (1999d). Les dossiers de la Houillère 4: Le puits d'Éboulet, Association des amis du musée de la mine.
- Parietti, Jean-Jacques (1999e). Les dossiers de la Houillère 5: Le puits du Magny, Association des amis du musée de la mine.
- Parietti, Jean-Jacques; Petitot, Christiane (2005). Géomètre aux houillères de Ronchamp, Association des amis du musée de la mine.
- Thirria, Édouard (1869). Manuel à l'usage de l'habitant du département de la Haute-Saône.
- Mathet, François (1881). Mémoire sur les mines de Ronchamp, Société de l'industrie minérale.
- Trautmann, E. (1885). Bassin houiller de Ronchamp.
- Société de l'industrie minérale, Bulletin trimestriel, Saint-Étienne. 1882.
- Godard, Michel (2012). Enjeux et impacts de l'exploitation minière du bassin houiller de Romchamp (1810-1870).
