= Sainte-Pauline shaft =

Coal mine shaft in Haute-Saône, France

Sainte-Pauline Shaft
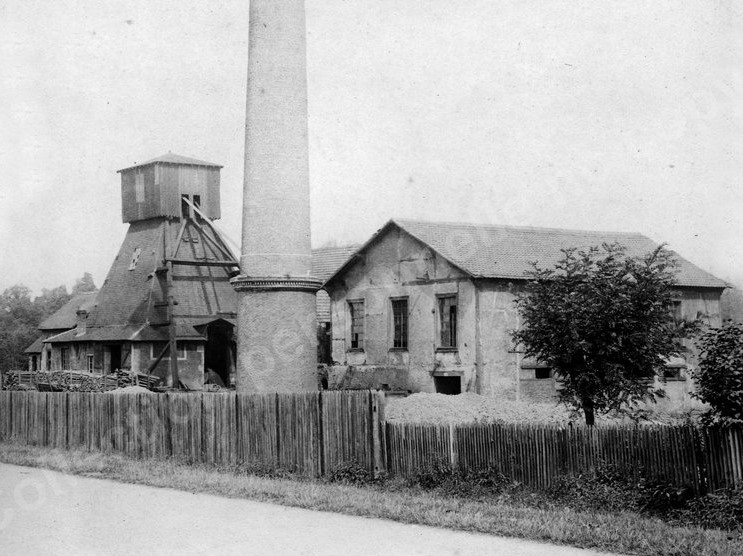
- The well before its closure.

- Location within France
- Location: Champagney Haute-Saône Bourgogne-Franche-Comté, France; 47°41′35″N 6°39′38″E
- Products: Bituminous coal
- Greatest depth: 546 m
- Opened: 1861
- Closed: 1884
- Company: Ronchamp coal mines

The Sainte-Pauline shaft is a former coal mine shaft located in the Ronchamp coal basin, along the RD 619 road in the commune of Champagney, Haute-Saône, eastern France. Excavation began in 1854, and coal extraction took place from 1861 until the shaft was backfilled in 1884.

In the 1870s, a mining settlement was established near the shaft, including a phalanstery and a Catholic chapel. These structures remained inhabited into the early 21st century. Visible remnants include parts of the shaft and slag heaps. An informational panel installed in 2017 presents the history of the Sainte-Pauline and Sainte-Barbe shafts.

== Shaft sinking ==
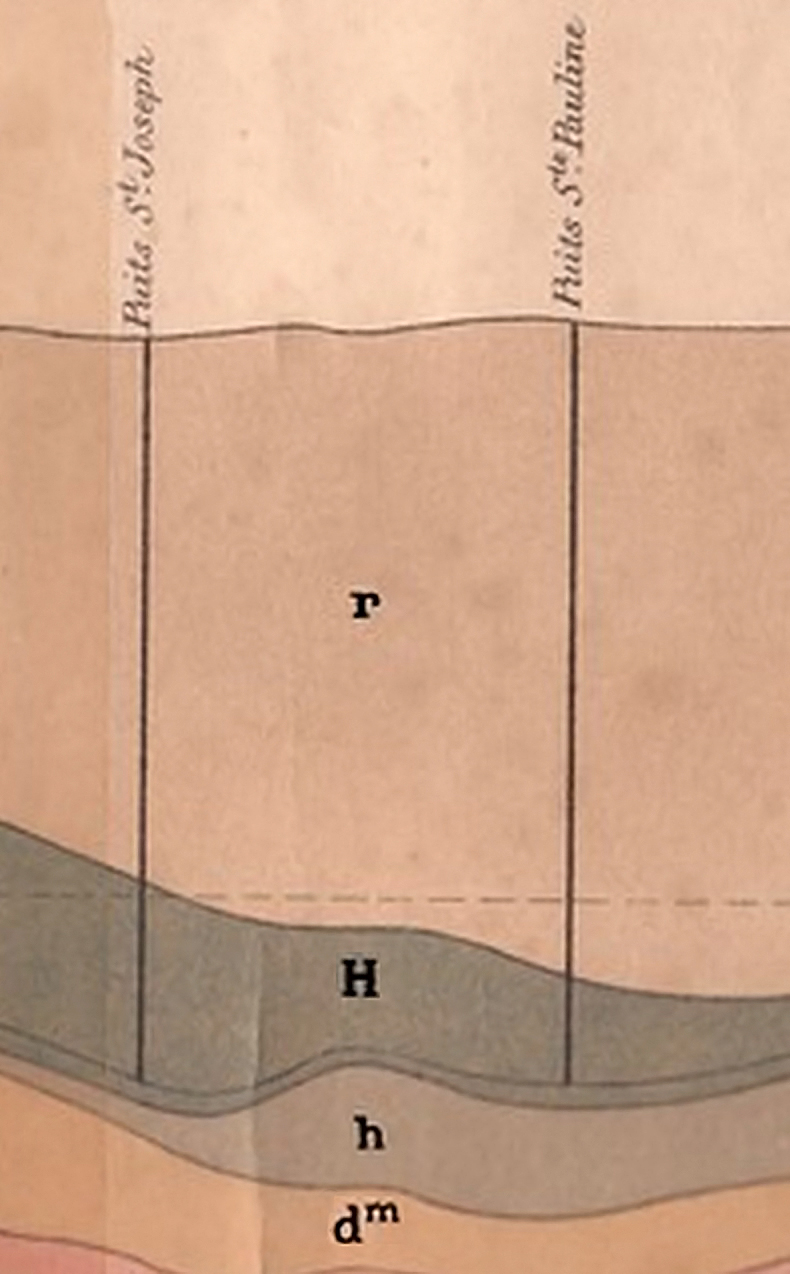
Geological cross-section of Sainte-Pauline well (right): r: red sandstone; H: upper coalfield; h: carboniferous terrain; d^{m}: metamorphic terrain.

Sinking of the Sainte-Pauline shaft began on May 31, 1854, approximately 1,100 meters southeast of the Saint-Joseph shaft, (Note: Mathet 1882, p. 589) along the RD 619 road in the Époisses woods, within the commune of Champagney, Haute-Saône. The initial cross-section of the shaft measured 3.05 meters by 2.15 meters. Timbering was first installed at a depth of 24.20 meters on February 22, 1855, and the rectangular lining extended to a depth of 40.80 meters. On August 1, 1857, at a depth of 180 meters, the shaft cross-section was changed to a circular shape with a diameter of 3.5 meters. The first coal seam, measuring 2.5 meters in thickness, was reached at a depth of 497.3 meters on February 1, 1861. Excavation ceased at a final depth of 546 meters.

== Surface installations ==
The mine carts used underground had a capacity of 400 kg and were brought to the surface using two-level cages (Note: Mathet 1882, p. 596) equipped with Fontaine-type safety catches. (Note: Mathet 1882, p. 597) The hoisting engine, manufactured by A. Kœchlin & Cie in Mulhouse, was powered by eight generators supplied by three boilers. This steam engine, incorporating components commonly found in locomotives, (Note: Mathet 1882, p. 598) had a power output of 120 horsepower. It was installed on a cut-stone foundation (Note: Mathet 1882, p. 599) and featured two horizontal cylinders with a diameter of 0.66 meters and a stroke of two meters. (Note: Mathet 1882, p. 600) The operator controlled the system from a platform above the engine floor, managing the admission flywheel, steam brake, gear shift, and purging mechanisms. (Note: Mathet 1882, p. 601)

A three-horsepower steam engine, equipped with a horizontal cylinder operating at 100 revolutions per minute, powered two pressure pumps and one shaft pump, all connected to a single drive shaft. (Note: Mathet 1882, p. 602) The hoisting building was constructed using timber framing with brick infill and was integrated with the headframe. The hoisting engine and boilers were housed in a T-shaped double building, with the vertical section containing the engine and the horizontal section housing the boilers. (Note: Mathet 1882, pp. 608–609) A Guibal fan with a diameter of nine meters was also installed. The construction of the surface installations, which began in 1859, cost a total of 256,870 francs. (Note: Mathet 1882, p. 610)

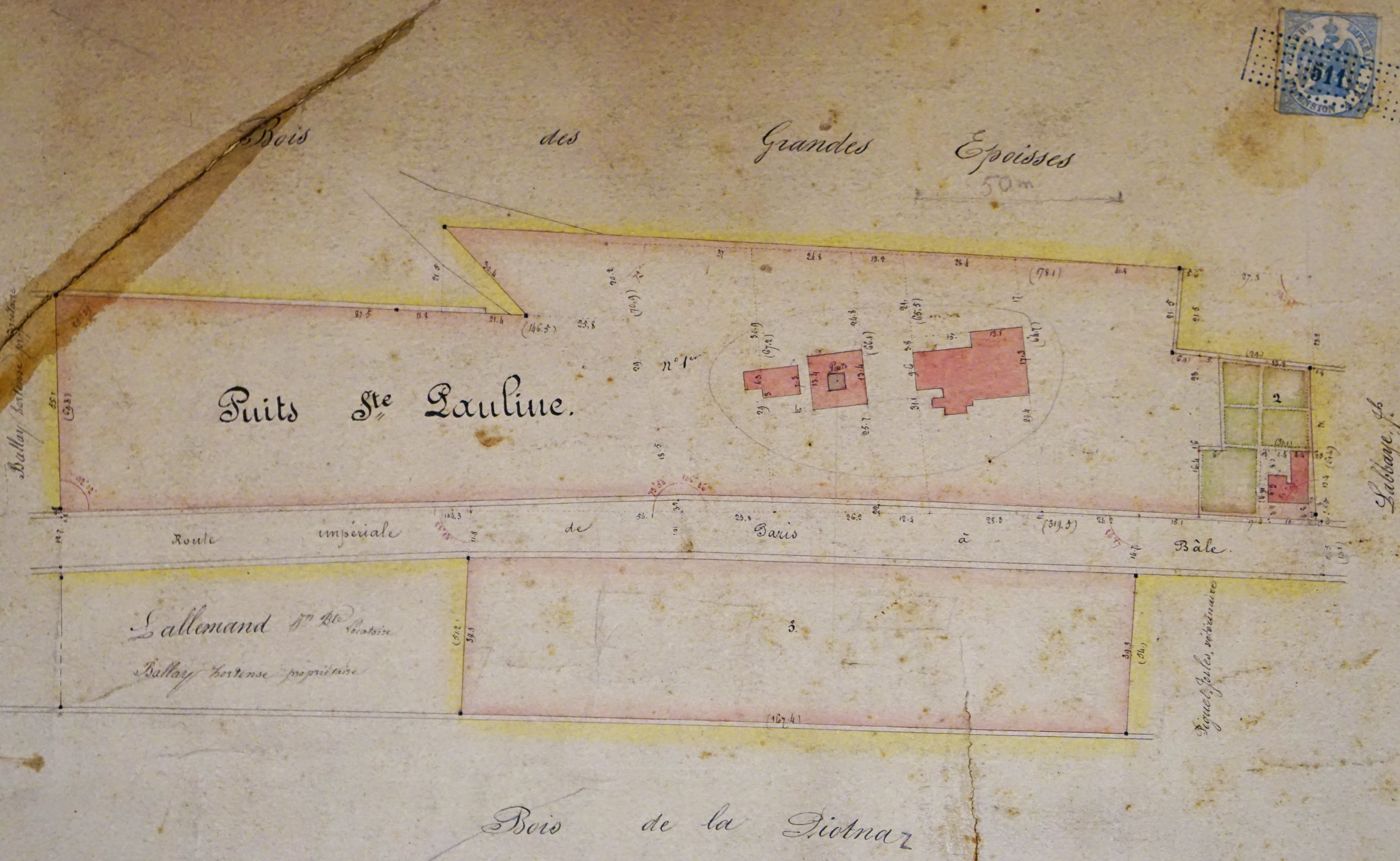
Floor plan of the active Sainte-Pauline well.

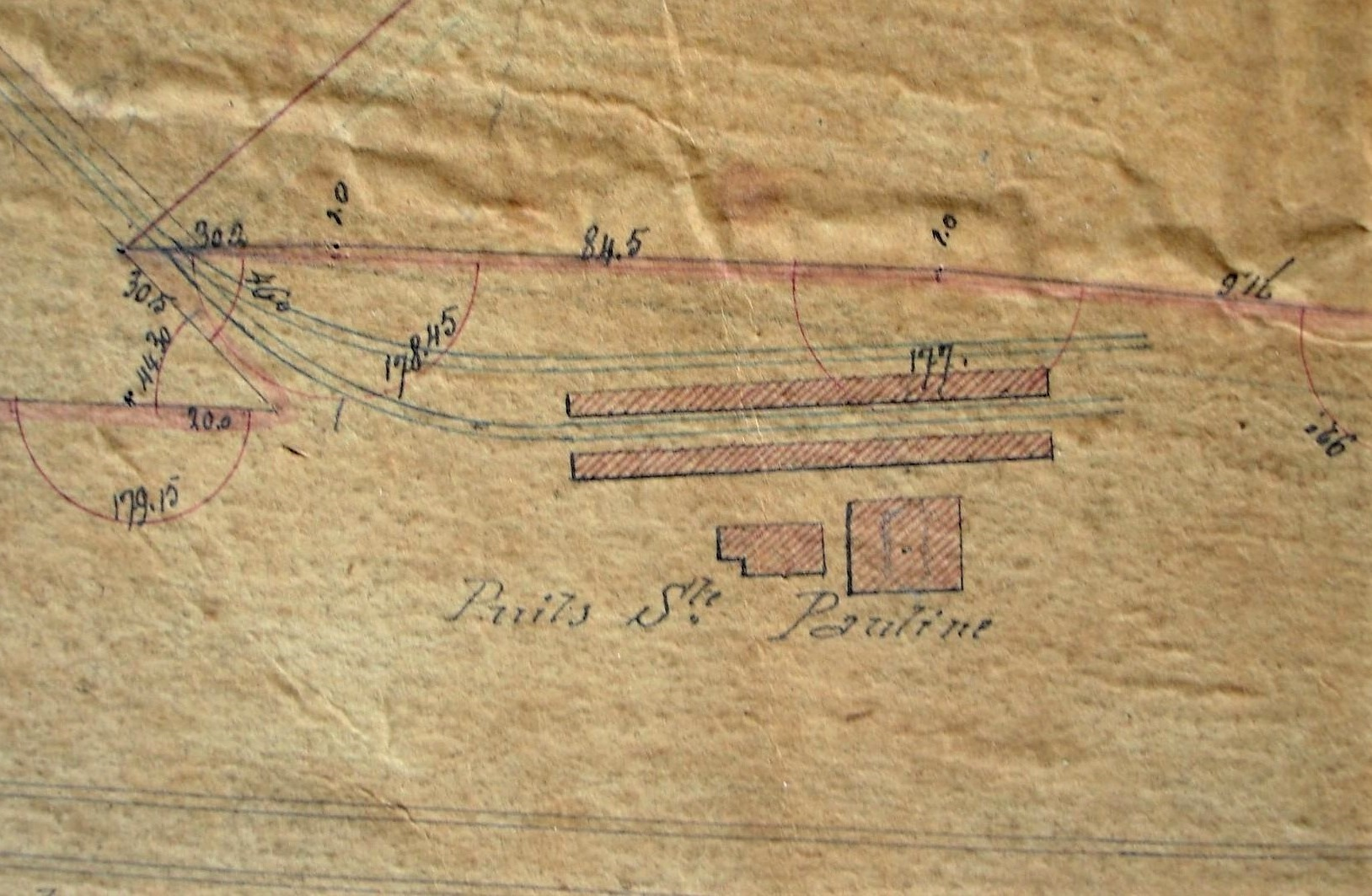
Another plan showing the tracks and slopes.

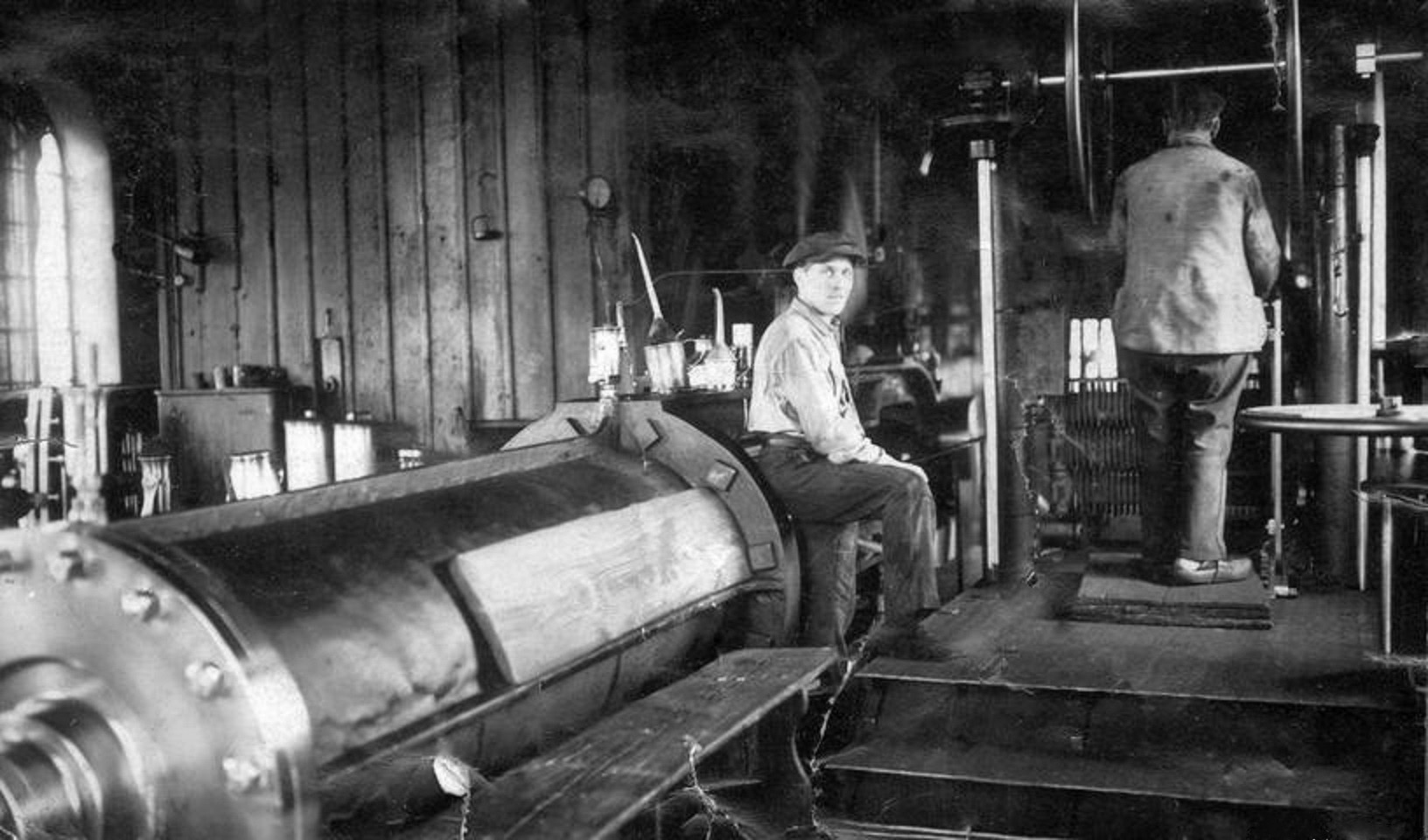
The reused steam engine at the Chanois well.

== Operations ==
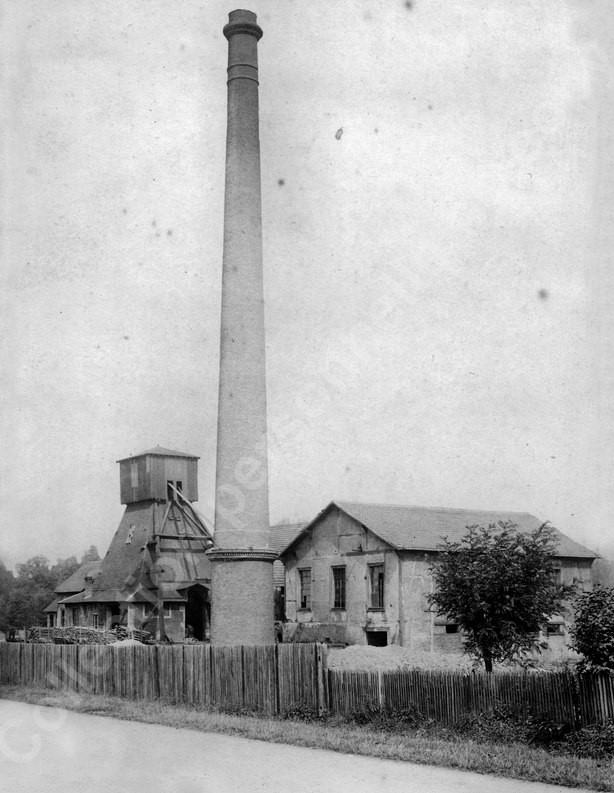
General view of the tile floor.

Ventilation during the initial operations at the Sainte-Pauline shaft was provided by two Duvergier fans recovered from the Saint-Joseph shaft. The extraction field was limited due to surrounding constraints: fractured terrain near the Sainte-Barbe shaft to the north and east, the concession boundary to the south, and the Saint-Joseph workings to the west. Additionally, the second coal seam was not located by the shaft. The exploitable area covered approximately 55 hectares, with an estimated coal volume of one million tons. (Note: Mathet 1882, p. 590) The deposit was characterized by thin coal seams with a steep dip, and the shale layer forming the roof of the galleries was highly friable, leading to frequent collapses. (Note: Mathet 1882, p. 592)

In 1861, a sloped drift was excavated southward in solid coal, extending beyond the original concession boundaries. The operating company subsequently sought to expand the concession. In August of the same year, a railway segment known as the "new shafts line" was constructed to connect the Sainte-Pauline shaft to the broader coalfield railway network. Coal production totaled 45,423.6 tons in 1861, 55,981.6 tons in 1862, and 52,577.4 tons in 1863.

By 1867, the workings had reached the Éboulet fault. In September 1872, the Sainte-Barbe shaft ceased coal extraction and was designated as the ventilation shaft for the Sainte-Pauline workings, (Note: Mathet 1882, pp. 588–589) a function it had served since June 1869 with the installation of a Lemielle fan providing an airflow of 12 m³/s. This capacity was adequate for the limited and low-gas operations of the Sainte-Pauline shaft. (Note: Mathet 1882, p. 635) In 1884, the Sainte-Pauline shaft was permanently closed, the surface installations were dismantled, and the shaft was backfilled. The steam engine was subsequently reinstalled at the Chanois shaft, where it remained in operation until 1933.

== Remnants ==
In the early 21st century, the Sainte-Pauline shaft is visible as a funnel-shaped depression located near the RD 619 road. The former mining town and phalanstery also remain in place. The route of the former railway line has been converted into a trail passing through the Époisses woods, and is now integrated into a local fitness circuit. An informational panel detailing the history of the Sainte-Pauline and Sainte-Barbe shafts was installed at the trailhead in 2017.

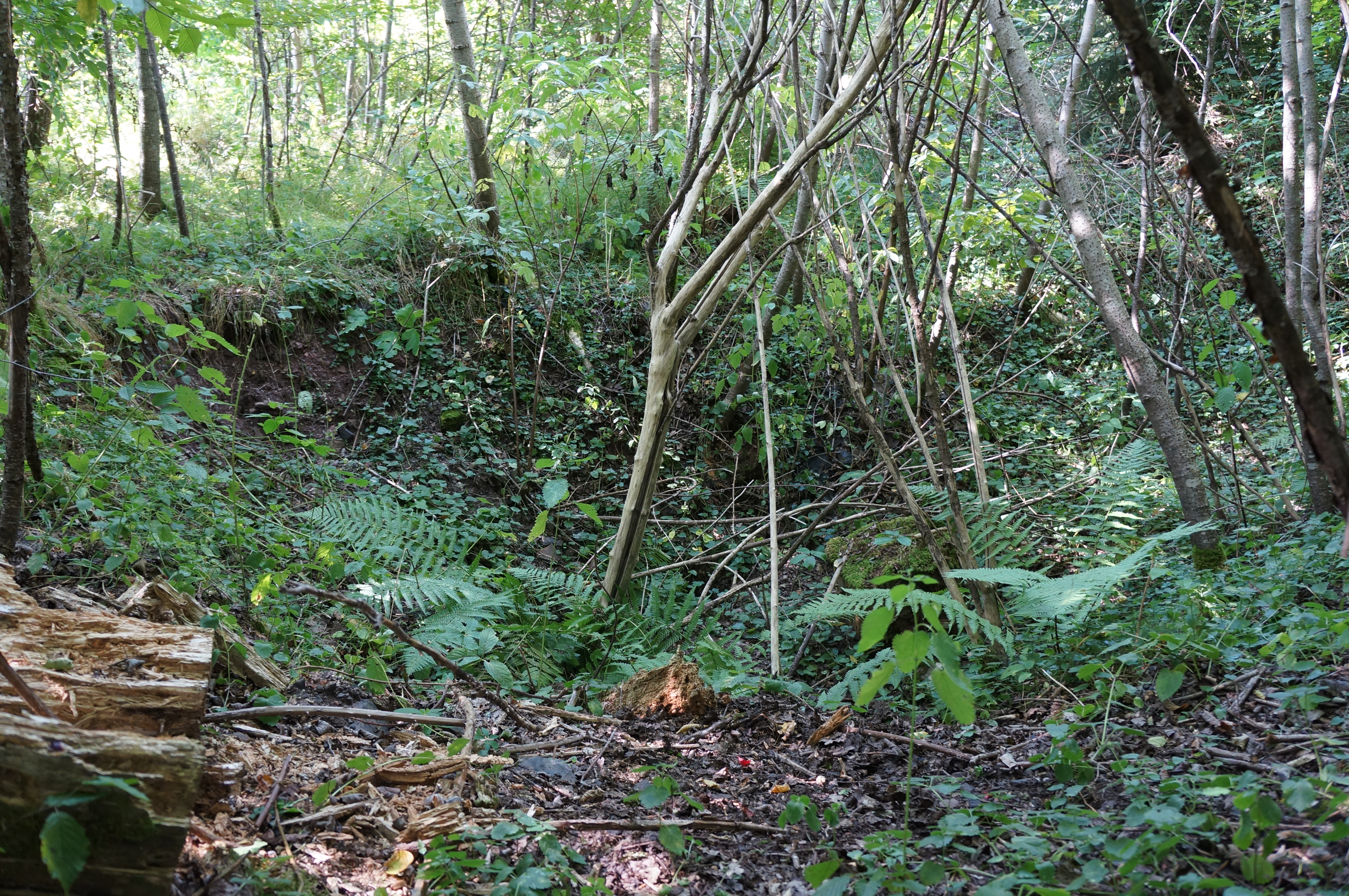
Funnel marking the site of the well.

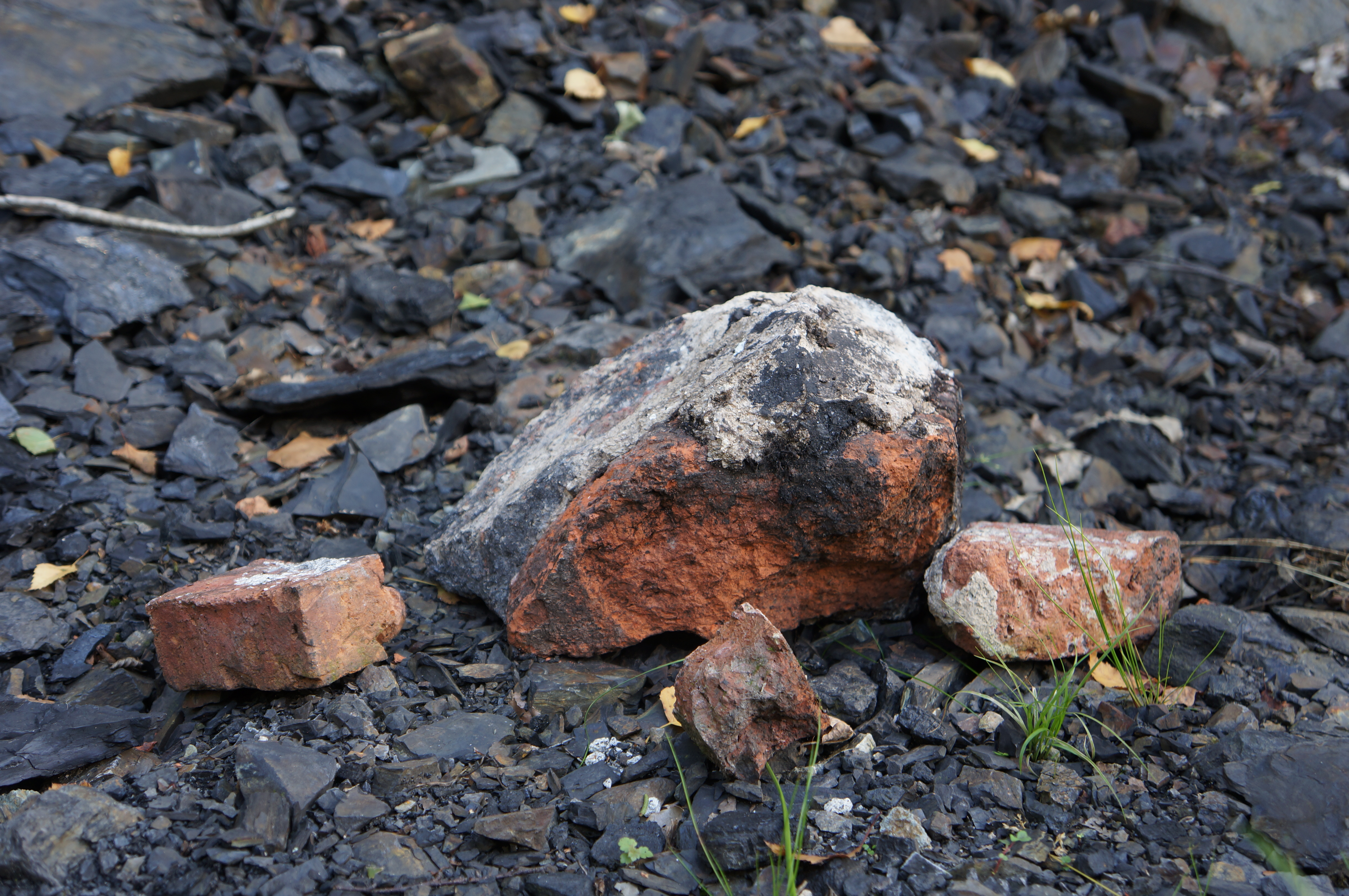
Old bricks from surface buildings.

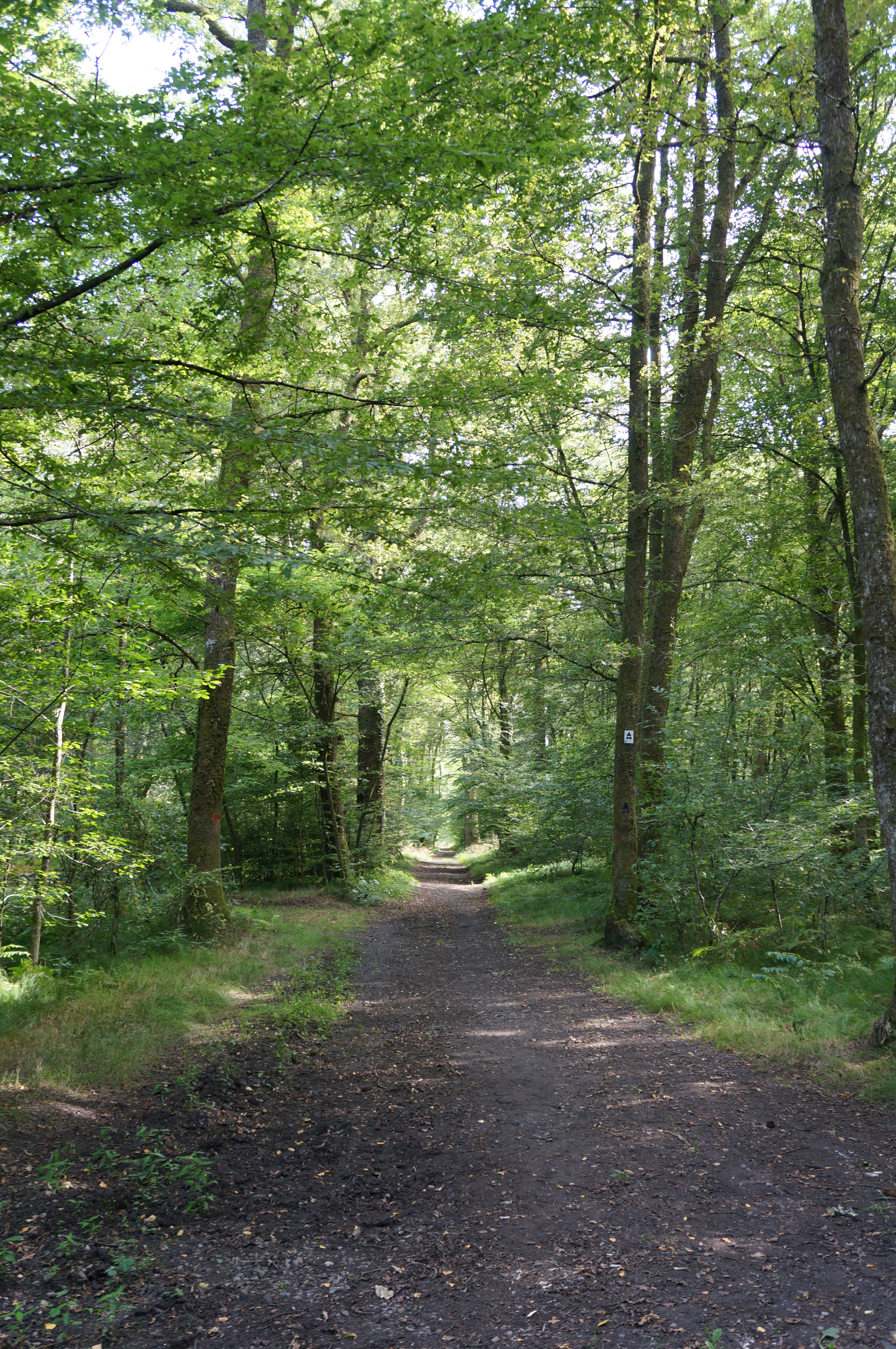
Old railroad track leading to the Sainte-Barbe well.

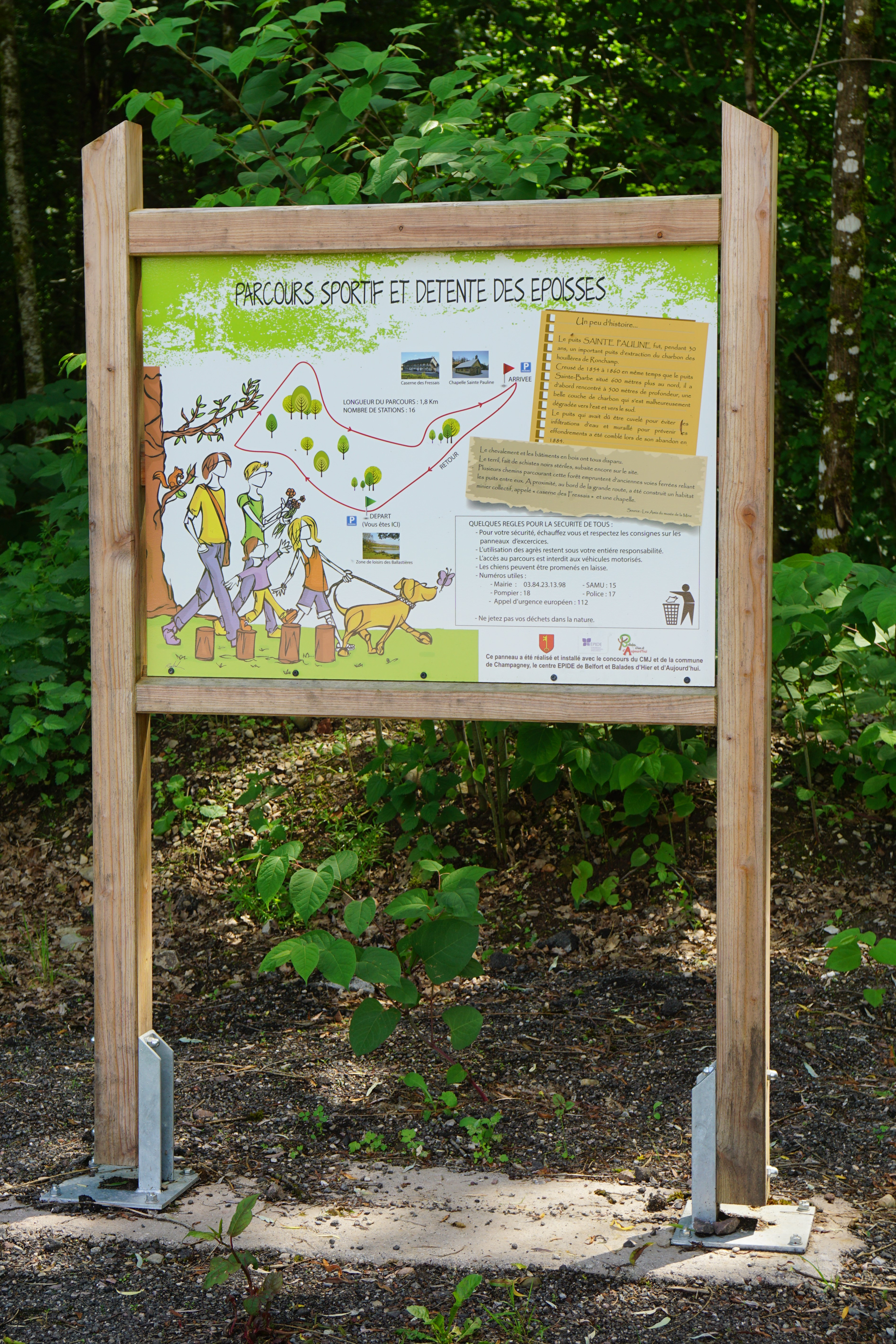
The well sign.

== Housing and place of worship ==
=== Époisses ===
47°41′39″N 6°39′25″E

The mining village of Époisses was constructed between 1872 and 1873 to accommodate laborers following the Franco-Prussian War of 1870. It comprises thirteen buildings, each divided into two residential units. Each unit includes a kitchen and bedroom on the ground floor, two bedrooms on the upper floor, a cellar, an attic, and a garden. Following the closure of the mines in 1958, the houses were sold to private owners. The village was added to the General Inventory of Cultural Heritage on 11 March 2010. (Note: Parietti 2010, p. 102)

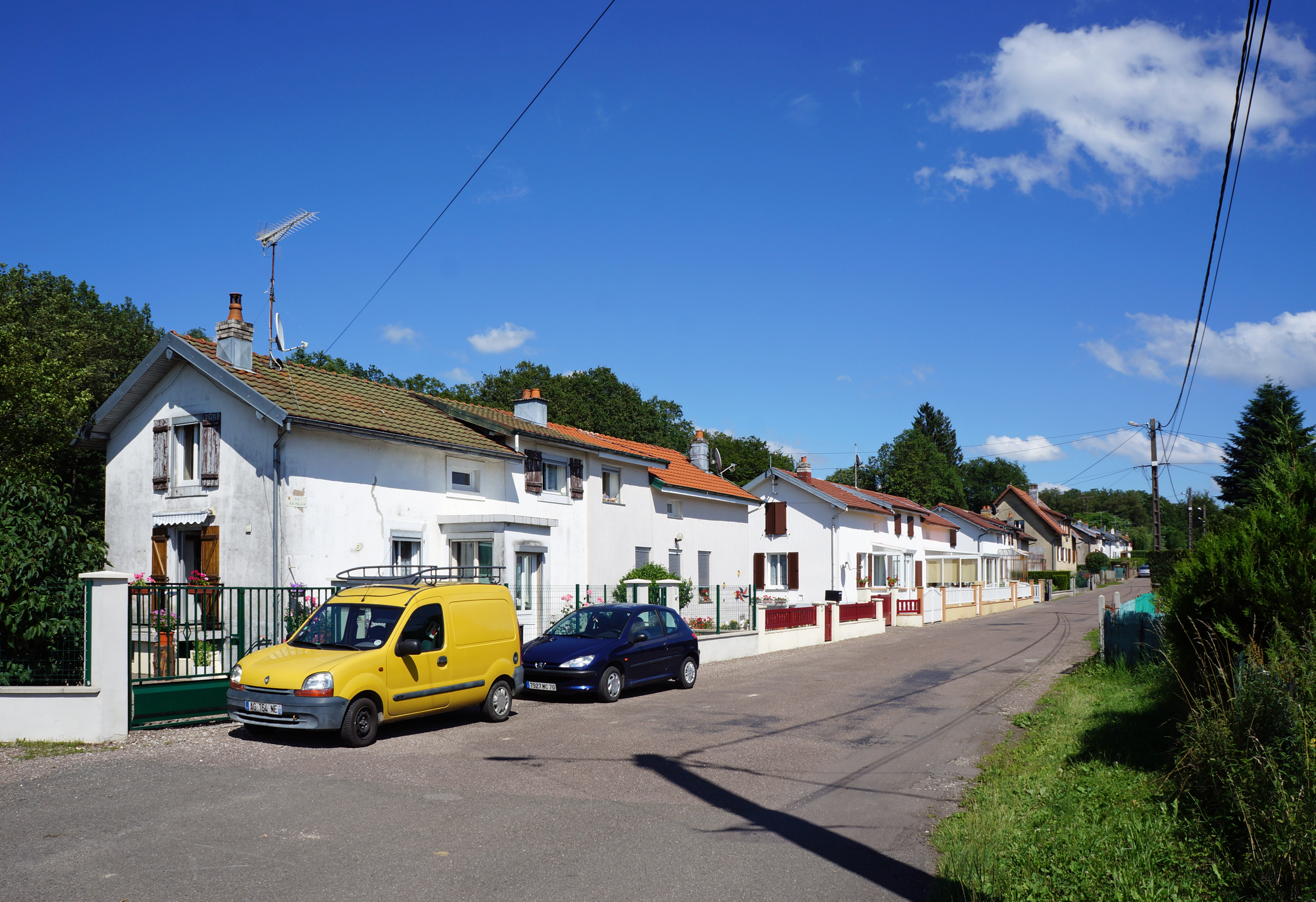
La cité des Époisses.

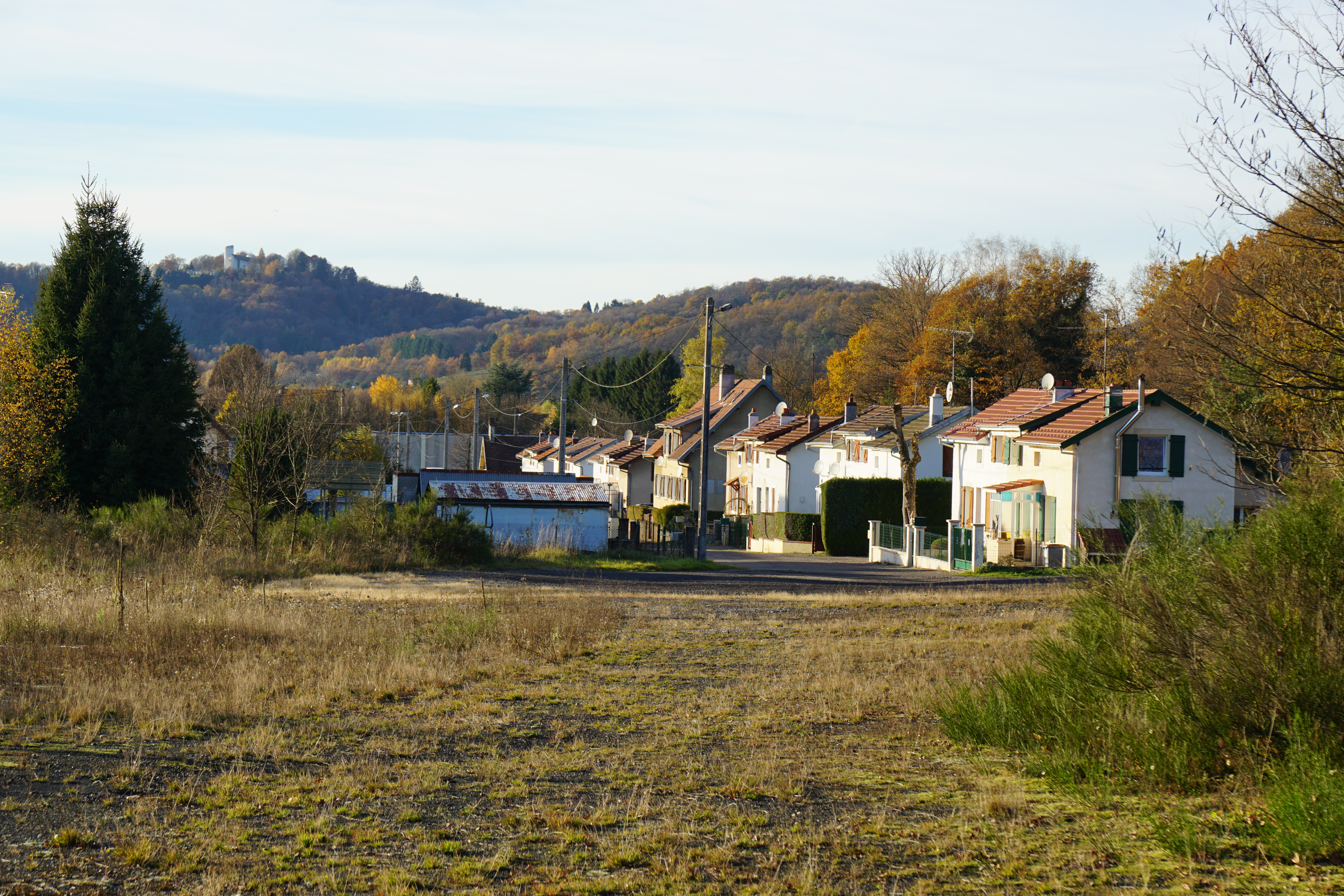
The Bourlémont housing estate and hill seen from the southern slag heap.

=== Phalanstery ===
47°41′33″N 6°39′35″E

In 1873, a phalanstery was constructed opposite the mine shaft, across Route 19. The building initially contained four dormitories with sixteen beds each and was used to accommodate sixty-four single miners from the village of Fresse. It was later converted into family housing for miners. (Note: Parietti 2010, p. 101)

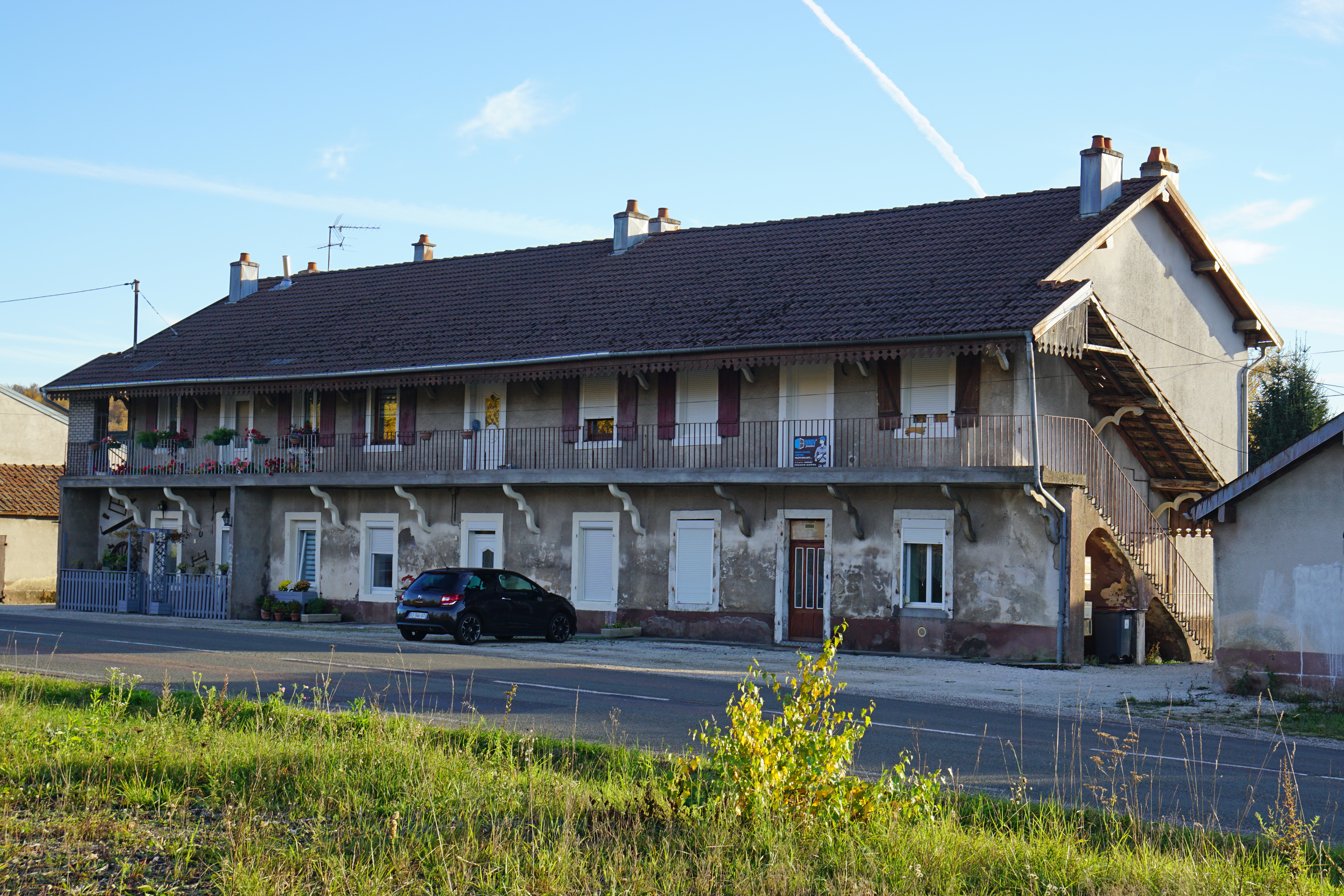
Phalanstery.

=== Sainte-Pauline chapel ===
47°41′40″N 6°39′19″E

A Catholic chapel was constructed opposite the mining village but was destroyed during bombings in 1944. It was rebuilt in 1954 on the other side of the national road, adjacent to the village. The chapel measures 50 meters in length.

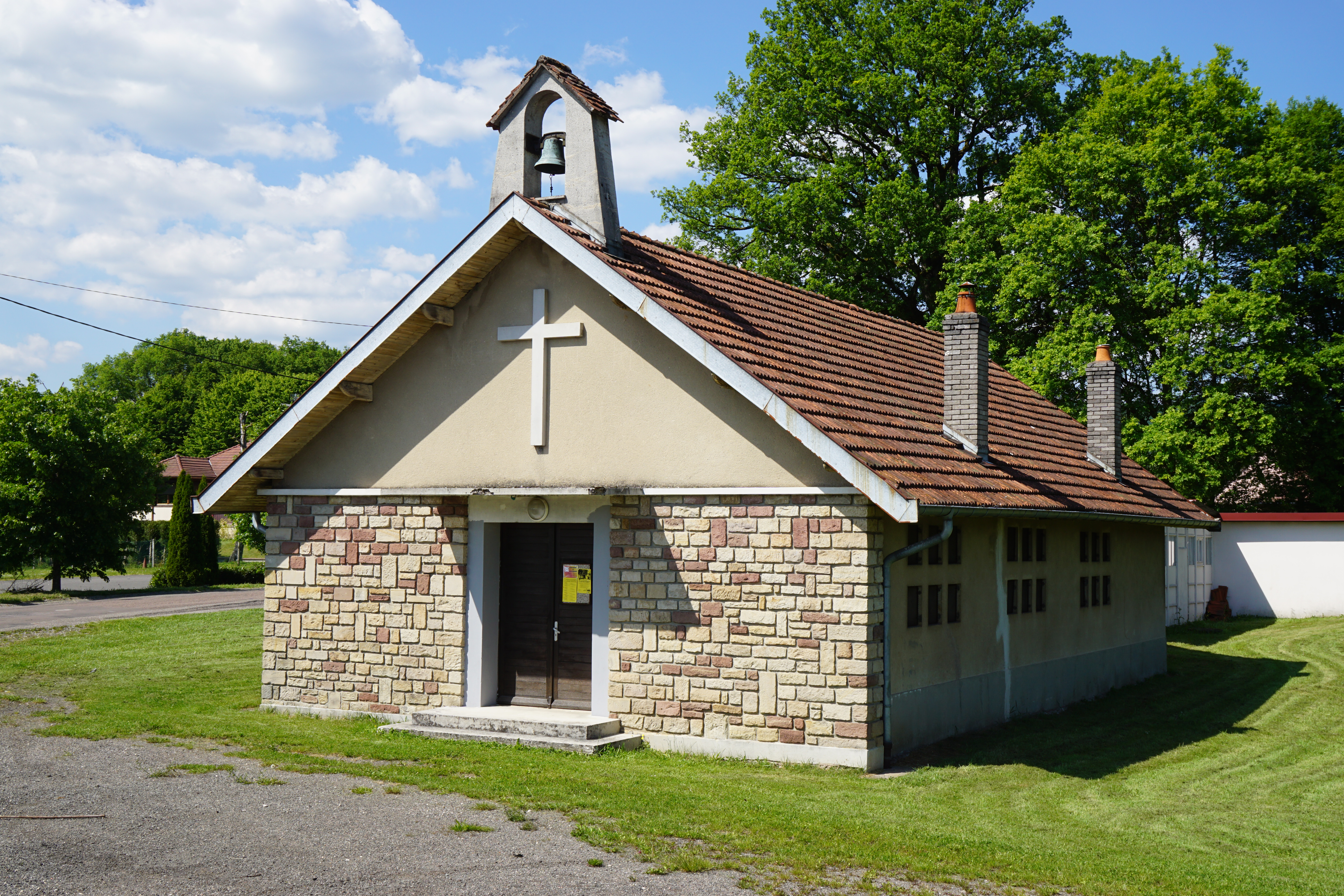
The Chapel.

== Spoil heaps ==
47°41′37″N 6°39′39″E, 47°41′36″N 6°39′33″E

Two flat spoil heaps are situated to the north and south of the former mine site. The southern heap was exploited during the 20th century, while the northern heap, which remains intact, contains several thousand cubic meters of shale and is now covered with vegetation, primarily birch trees. A horse carousel has been installed on the northern heap.

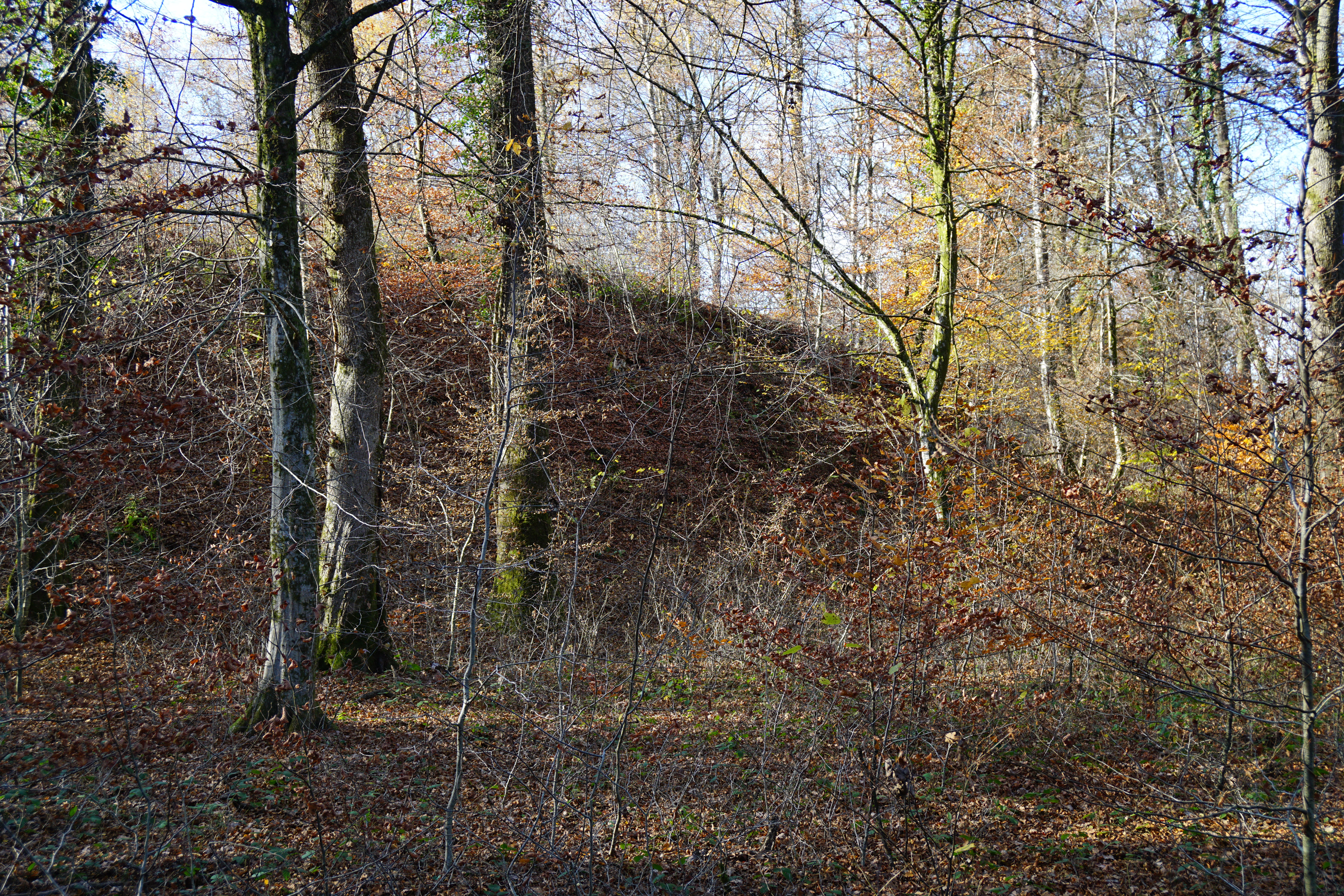
Wooded section of the northern slag heap.

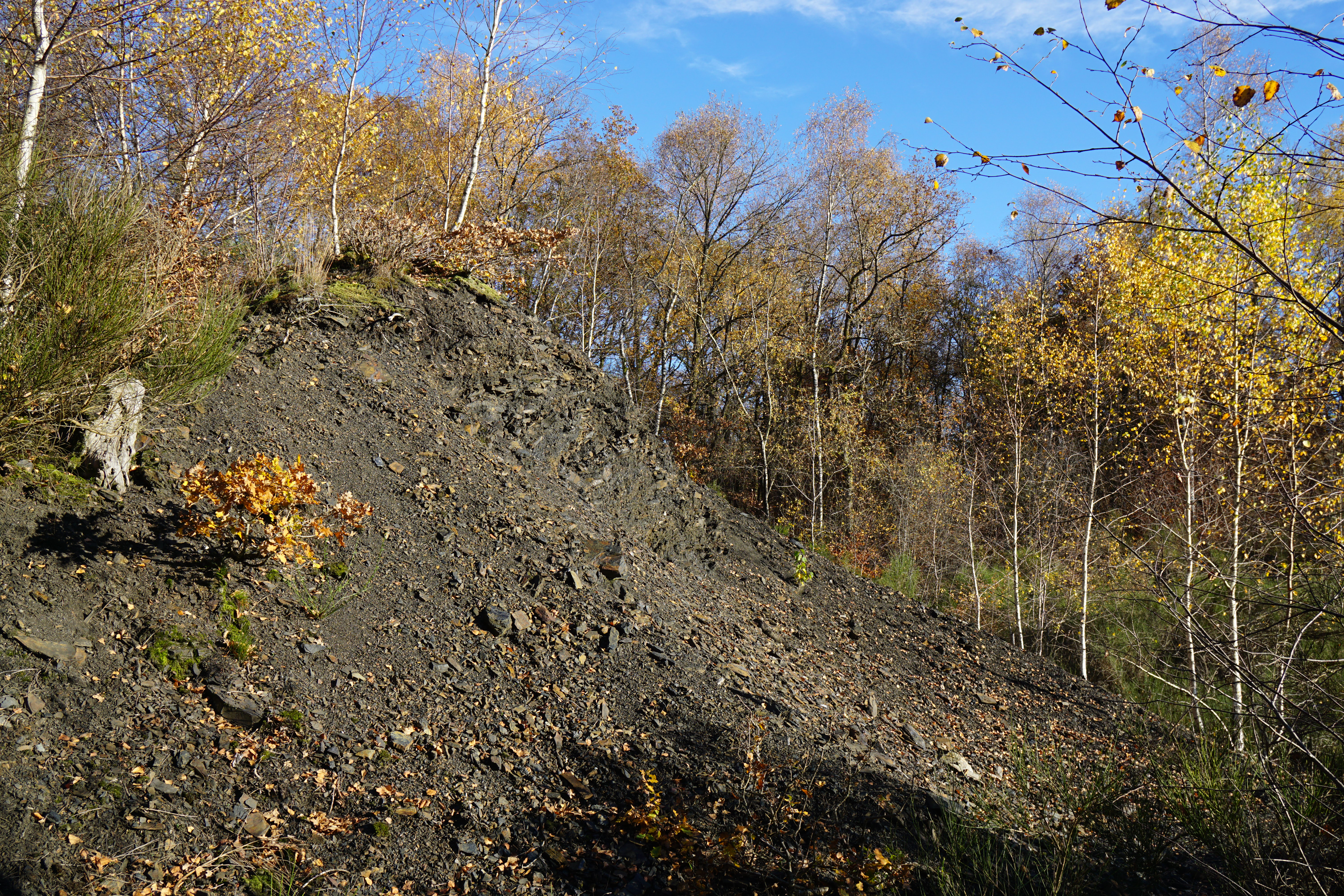
Summit section.

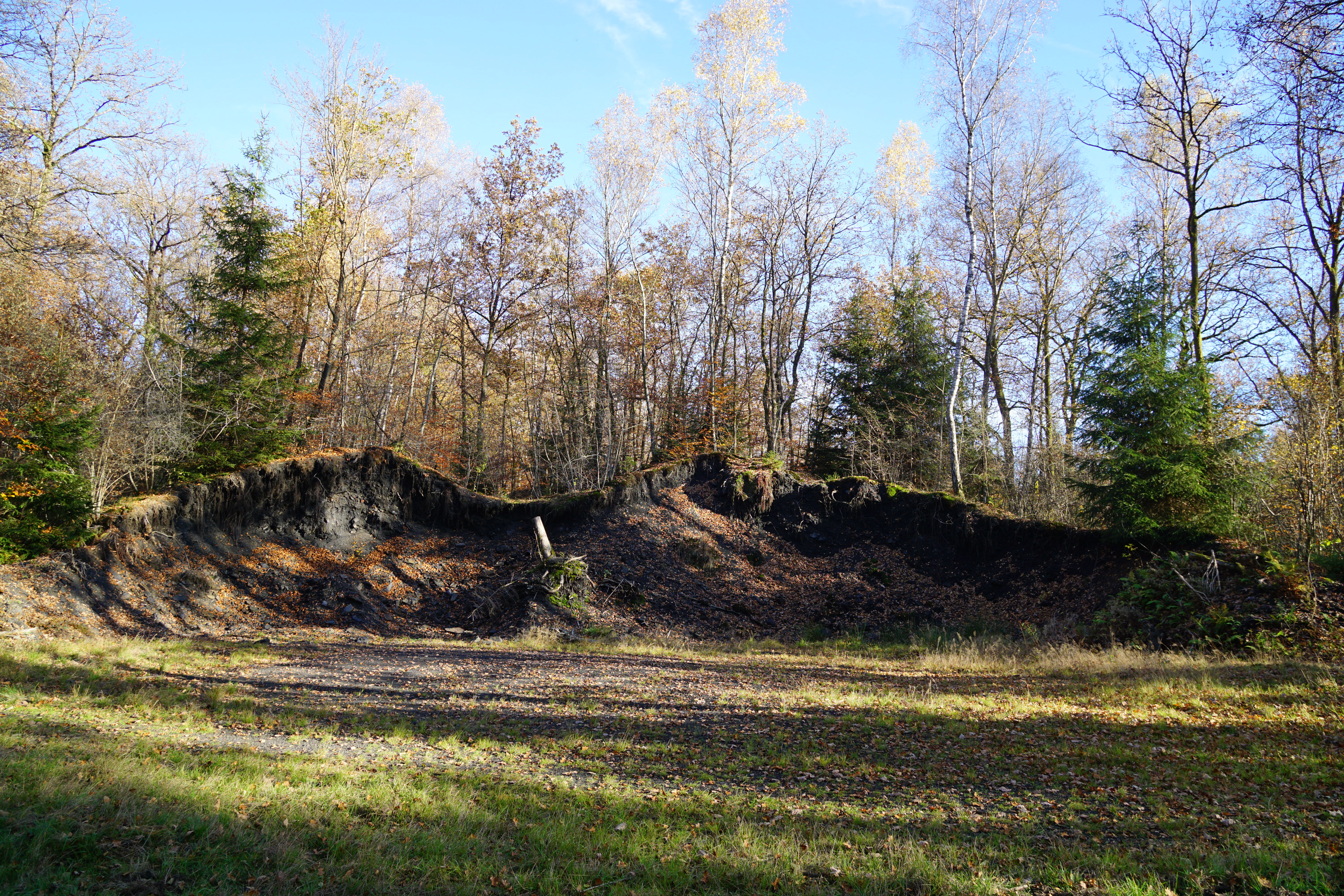
Cleared area.

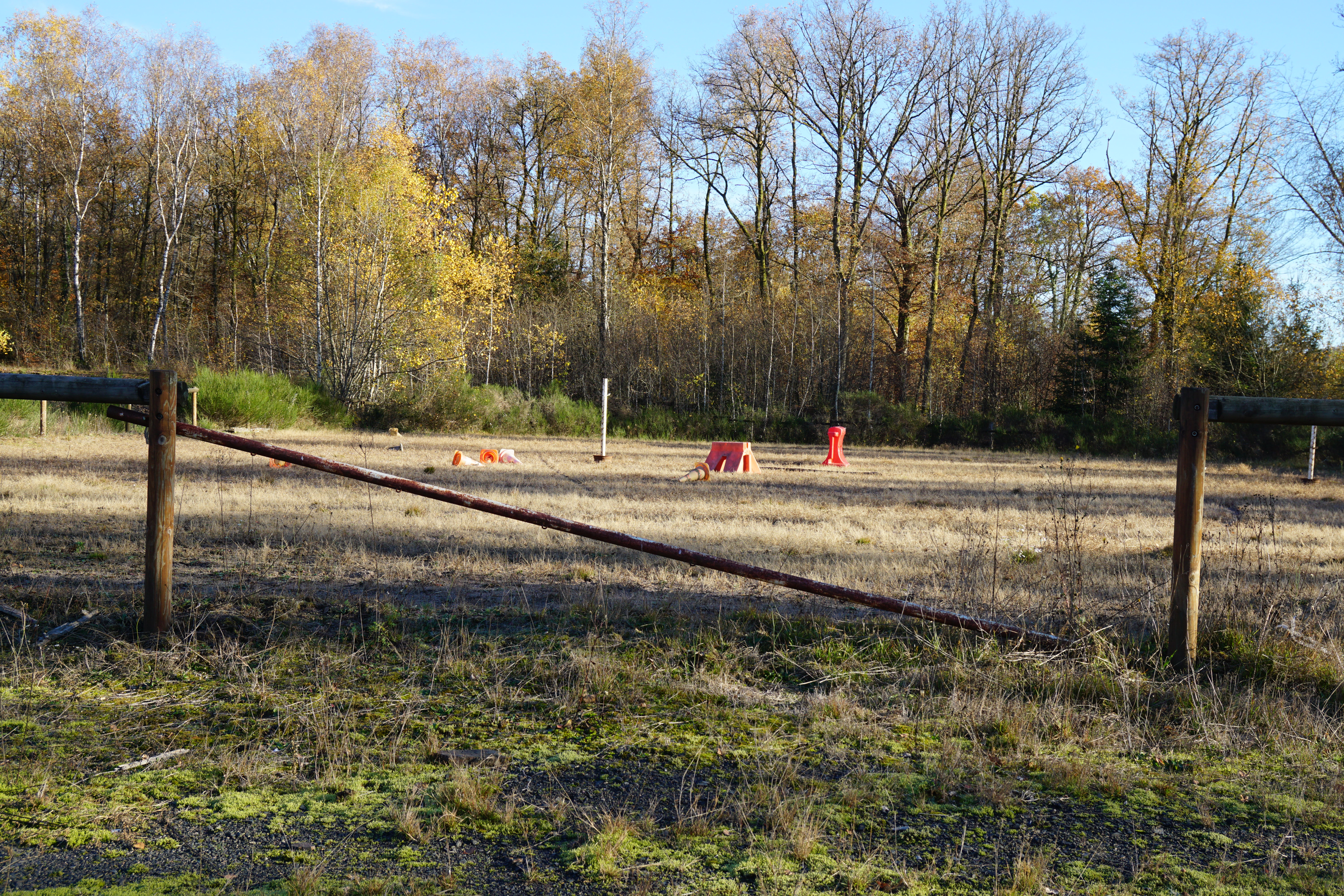
The horse arena.

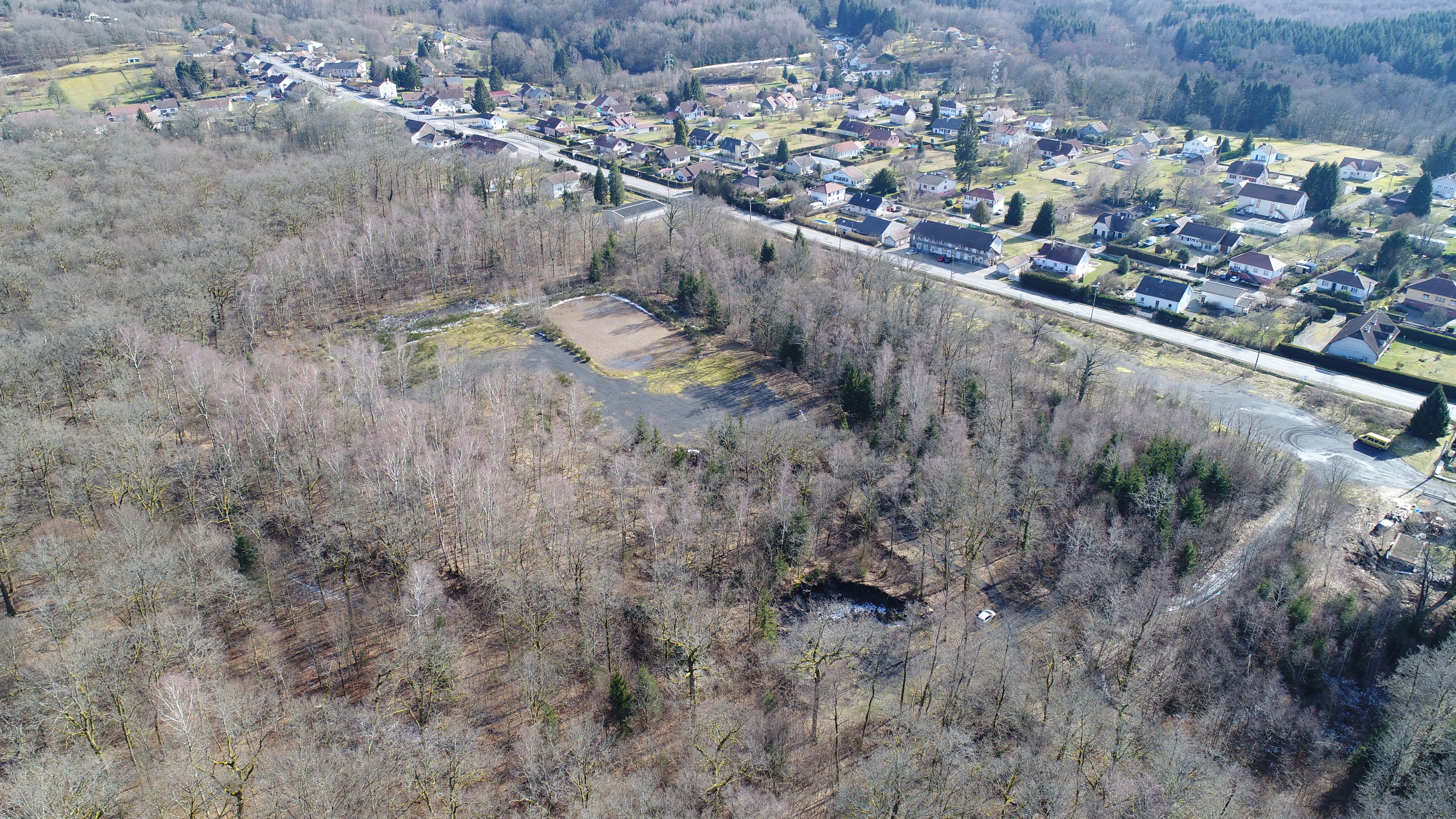
General aerial view of the slag heap.

== See also ==
- Ronchamp colliery shafts
- Saint-Joseph coal mine
- Sainte Marie coal mine
- Chanois coal mine

== Bibliography ==
- Parietti, Jean-Jacques (2001). Les Houillères de Ronchamp vol. I : La mine [The Ronchamp Coal Mines Vol. I: The Mine] (in French). Éditions Comtoises. ISBN 2-914425-08-2.
- Parietti, Jean-Jacques (2010). Les Houillères de Ronchamp vol. II : Les mineurs [The Ronchamp Coal Mines Vol. II: The Miners] (in French). Noidans-lès-Vesoul, fc culture & patrimoine. ISBN 978-2-36230-001-1.
- Mathet, François (1882). Mémoire sur les mines de Ronchamp [Memoir on the Ronchamp mines] (in French). Société de l'industrie minérale.
- Godard, Michel (2012). Enjeux et impacts de l'exploitation minière du bassin houiller de Ronchamp (1810-1870) [Challenges and impacts of mining in the Ronchamp coalfield (1810-1870)] (in French). UTBM.
- Bulletin trimestriel [Quarterly newsletter] (in French). Saint-Étienne: Société de l'industrie minérale. 1882.
- Thirria, Édouard (1869). Manuel à l'usage de l'habitant du département de la Haute-Saône [Manual for residents of the Haute-Saône département] (in French). pp. 182–186.
