= Mining basin of Ronchamp and Champagney =

Coalfields in Haute-Saône

47°42′5.86″N 6°39′21.68″E

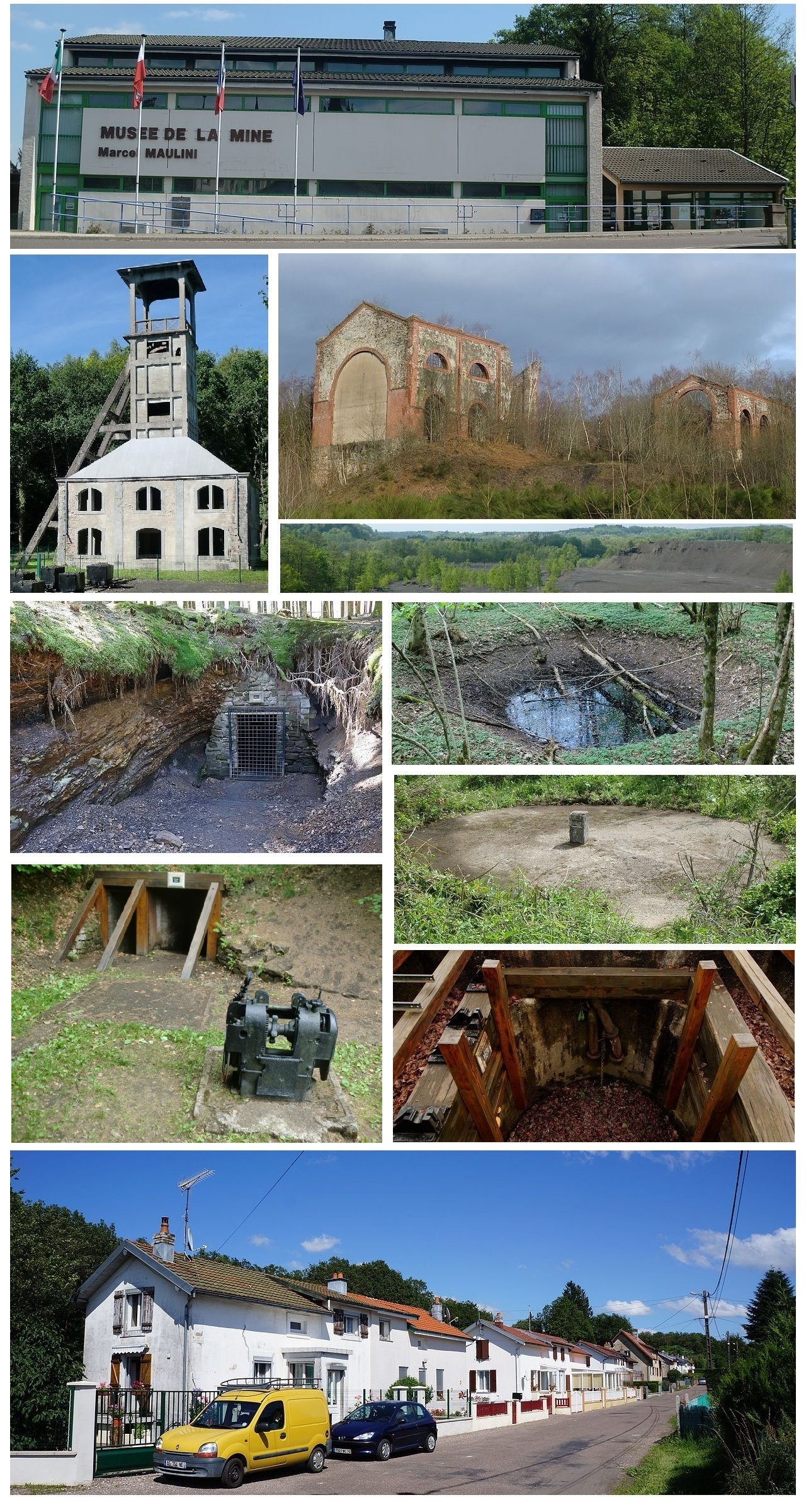
The landscape variety of the mining basin.

The mining basin of Ronchamp and Champagney is a territory located in the department of Haute-Saône and the French region of Bourgogne-Franche-Comté; economically, socially, environmentally, and culturally marked by the intensive exploitation of coal in its subsoil between the 18th and 20th centuries. It consists of the three main municipalities of Ronchamp, Champagney, and Magny-Danigon as well as several hamlets and other neighboring villages.

== Geography ==
=== Location ===
The mining basin is located in the department of Haute-Saône and the region of Bourgogne-Franche-Comté in Eastern France, not far from the Swiss border and the Territory of Belfort. It is at the heart of the coal basins of the Vosges and the Jura.

=== Geology ===
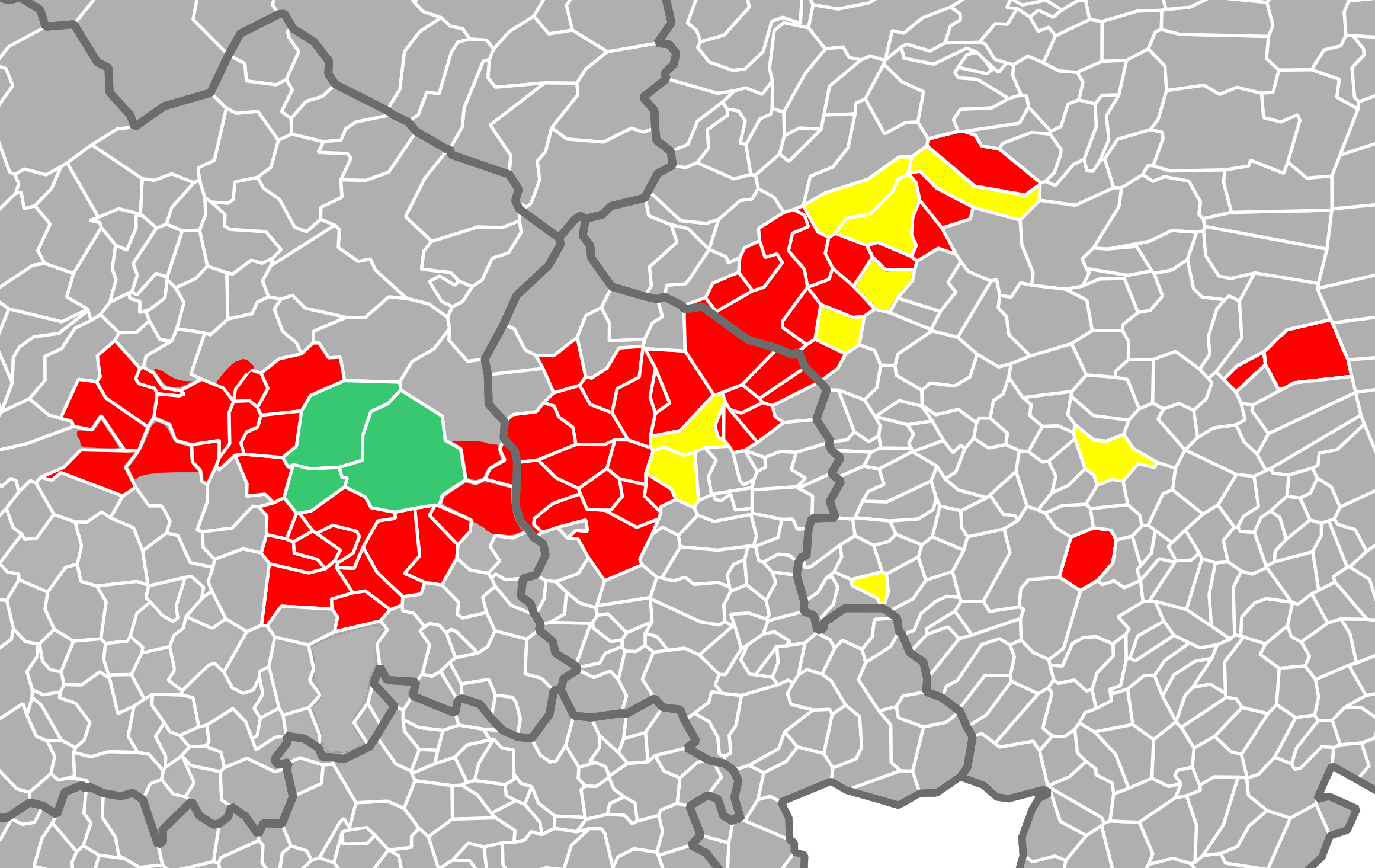
The Stephanian coal basin beneath the Vosges.

The territory is located on the plateau of Haute-Saône in the depression beneath the Vosges and is based on the southern slope of the Vosges massif. The deposit consists of two layers of coal (whose thickness varies from a few centimeters to three meters) extending over an area of five kilometers in length by two kilometers in width. This deposit is covered by red sandstone and various types of clay.

Extent of the mining basin on the map of municipalities in Haute-Saône.

Coal began its formation 300 million years ago, during the Carboniferous period. The transformation of plant debris took place over a period of 20 million years to form coal. During this phase, organic sediments gather in a basin and are covered by alluvium.

=== Municipalities ===
The mining basin includes the municipalities of Ronchamp, Champagney, and Magny-Danigon as well as the surrounding hamlets: Grattery, Recologne, Mourière, La Selle, Le Rhien, Le Montchauveau, La Houillère, Le Magny, and Éboulet.

The mining basin also includes municipalities that were not exploited and remained outside the concessions but were inhabited by miners and demographically and economically influenced by the exploitation of mines and its traditions. These are the villages of Fresse, Ternuay, Mélisey, Saint-Barthélemy, Malbouhans, La Côte, Palante, Lyoffans, Magny-Jobert, Andornay, Clairegoutte, and Frédéric-Fontaine. Among all these villages, Fresse is the most influenced by the mines and has marked the history of mining companies; the village already mined silver in the 16th century. In the early 19th century, it was the villages north of Ronchamp that provided the most labor, but the distance from the mine coal mines, which were increasingly dug towards the south, shifted the population towards the villages bordering Magny-Danigon.

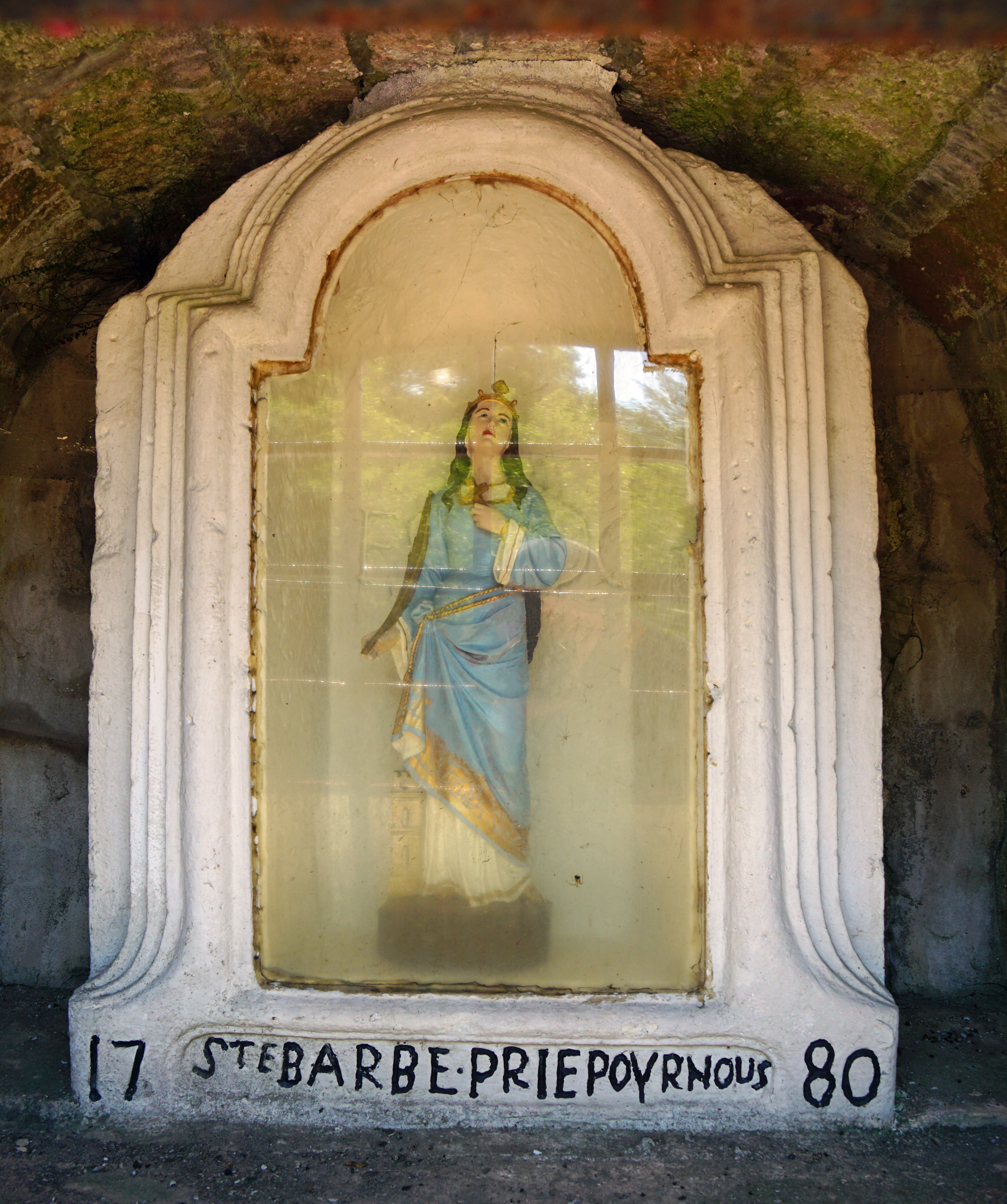
The Saint Barbara of Fresse.

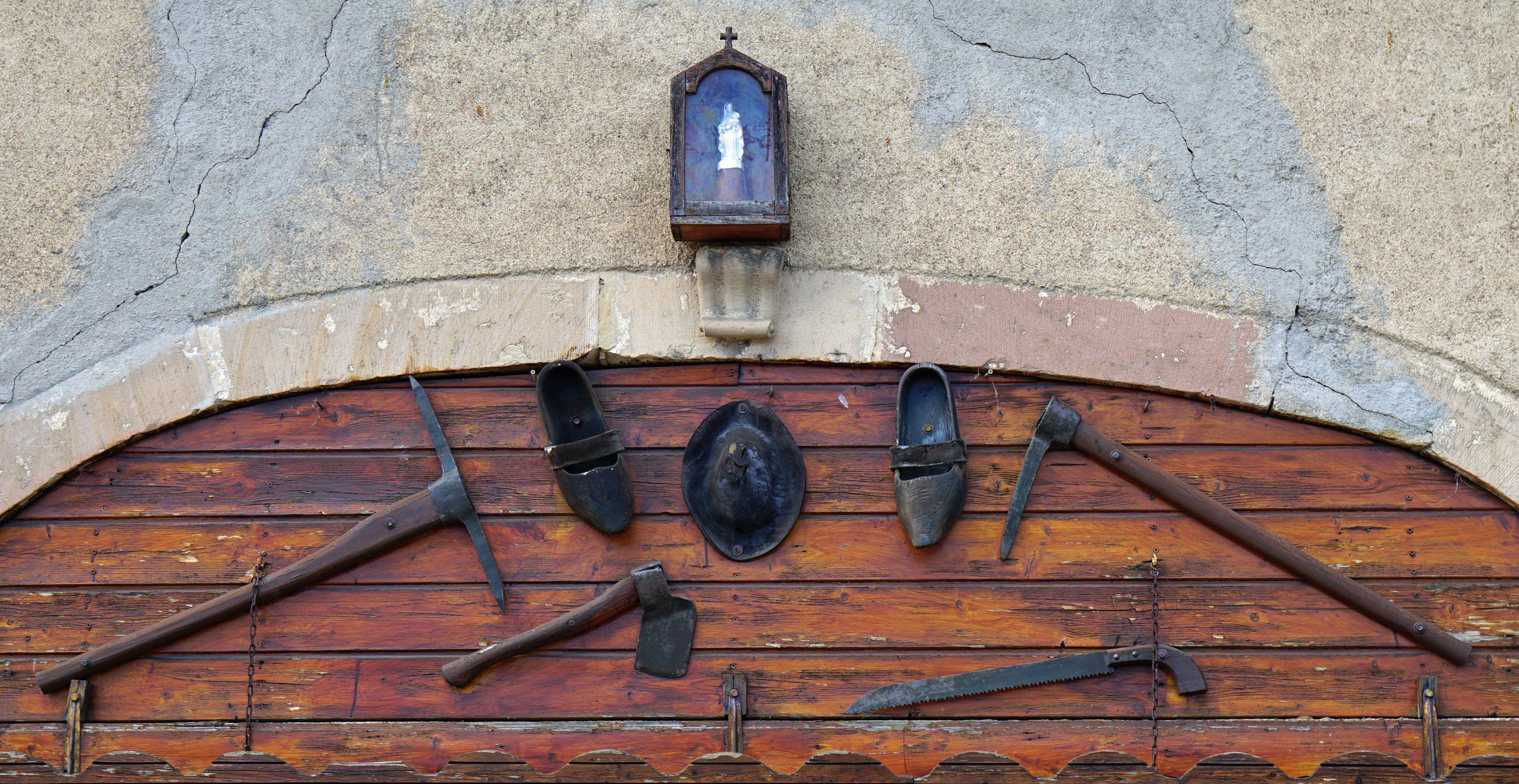
Mining tools at La Côte.

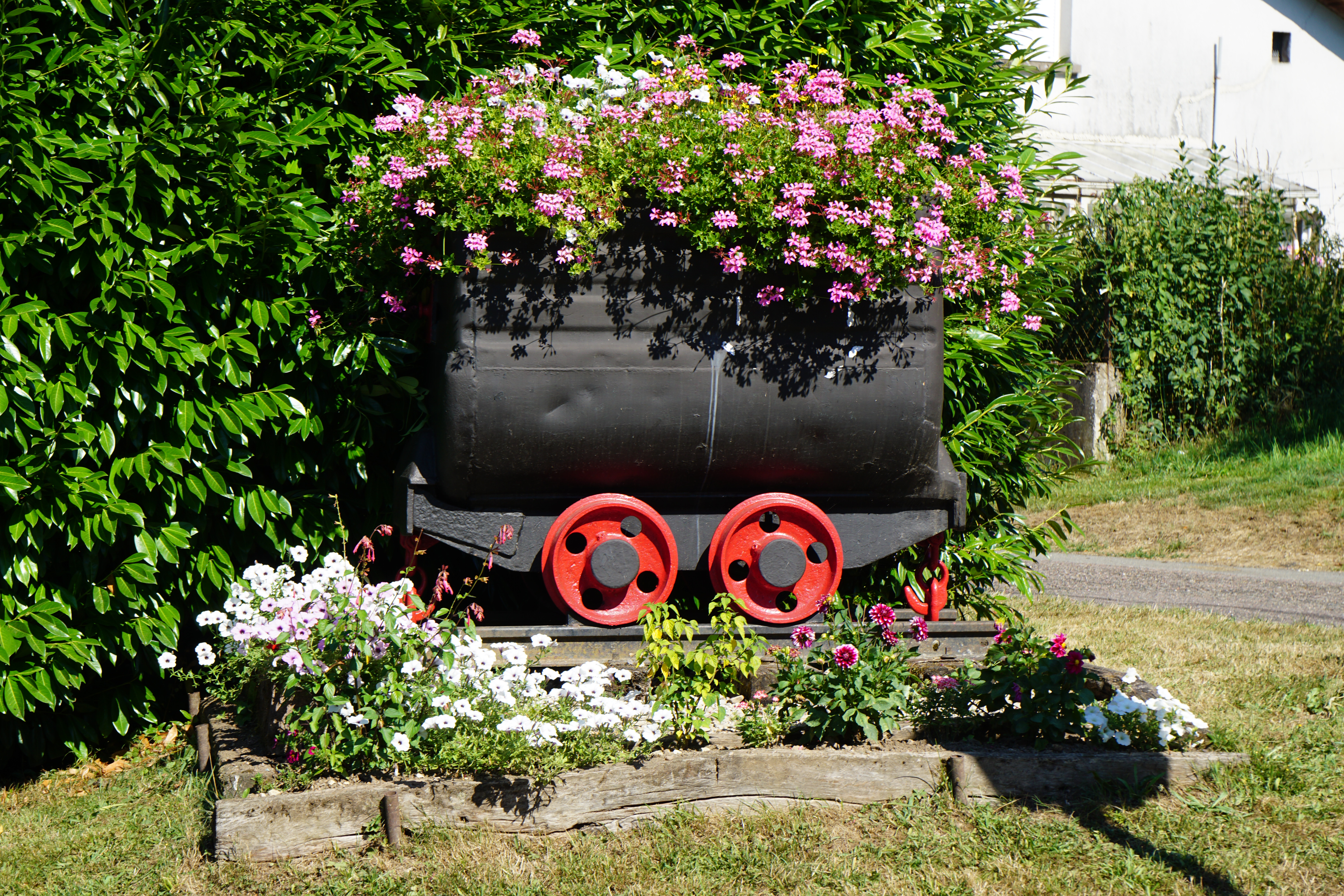
A mining cart at Clairegoutte.

=== Landscape ===
The northern part is heavily hilly due to the presence of the Vosges massif, while the southern part is flatter, with agriculture being highly developed.

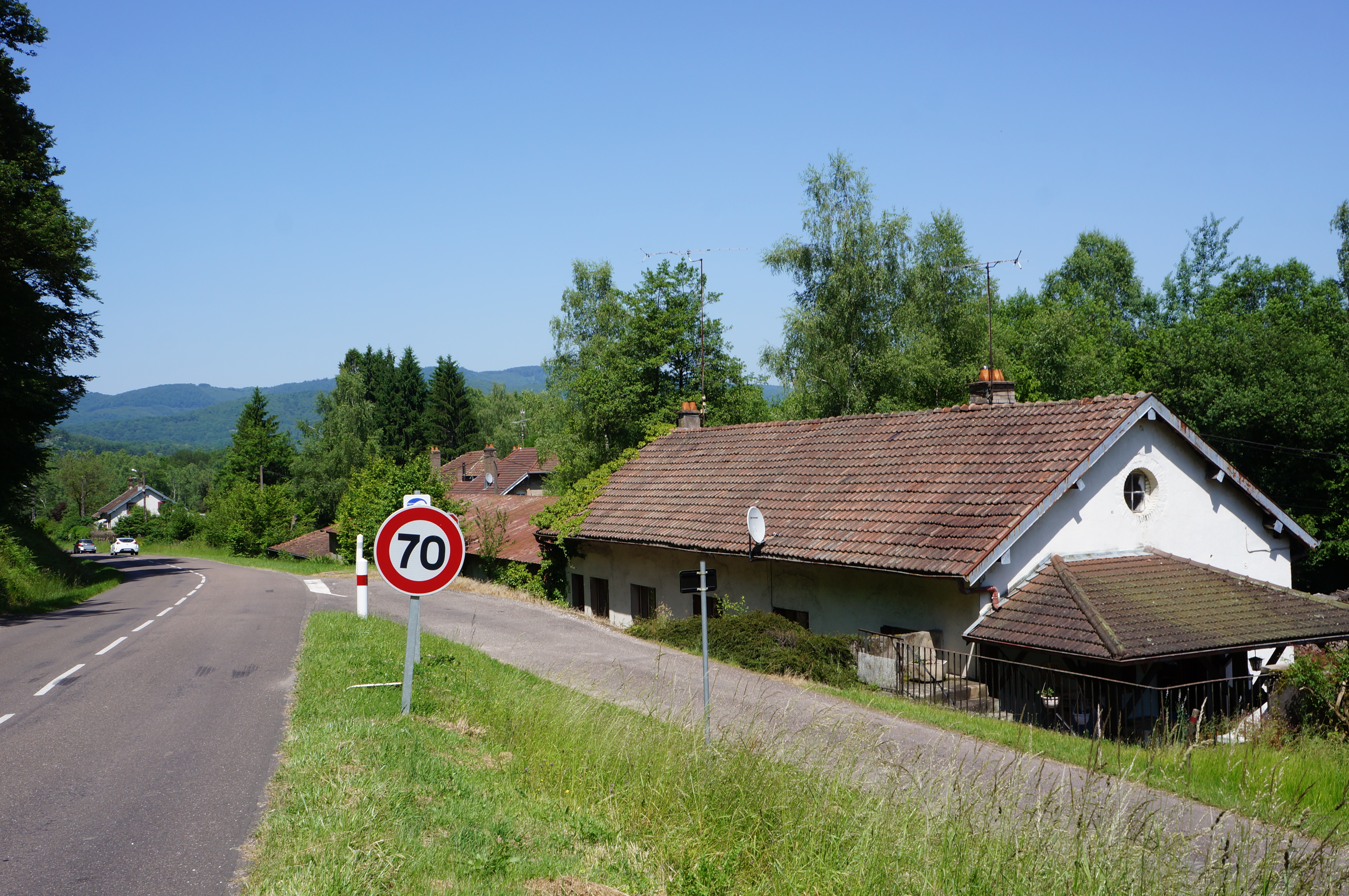
The hamlet of the Magny pit.

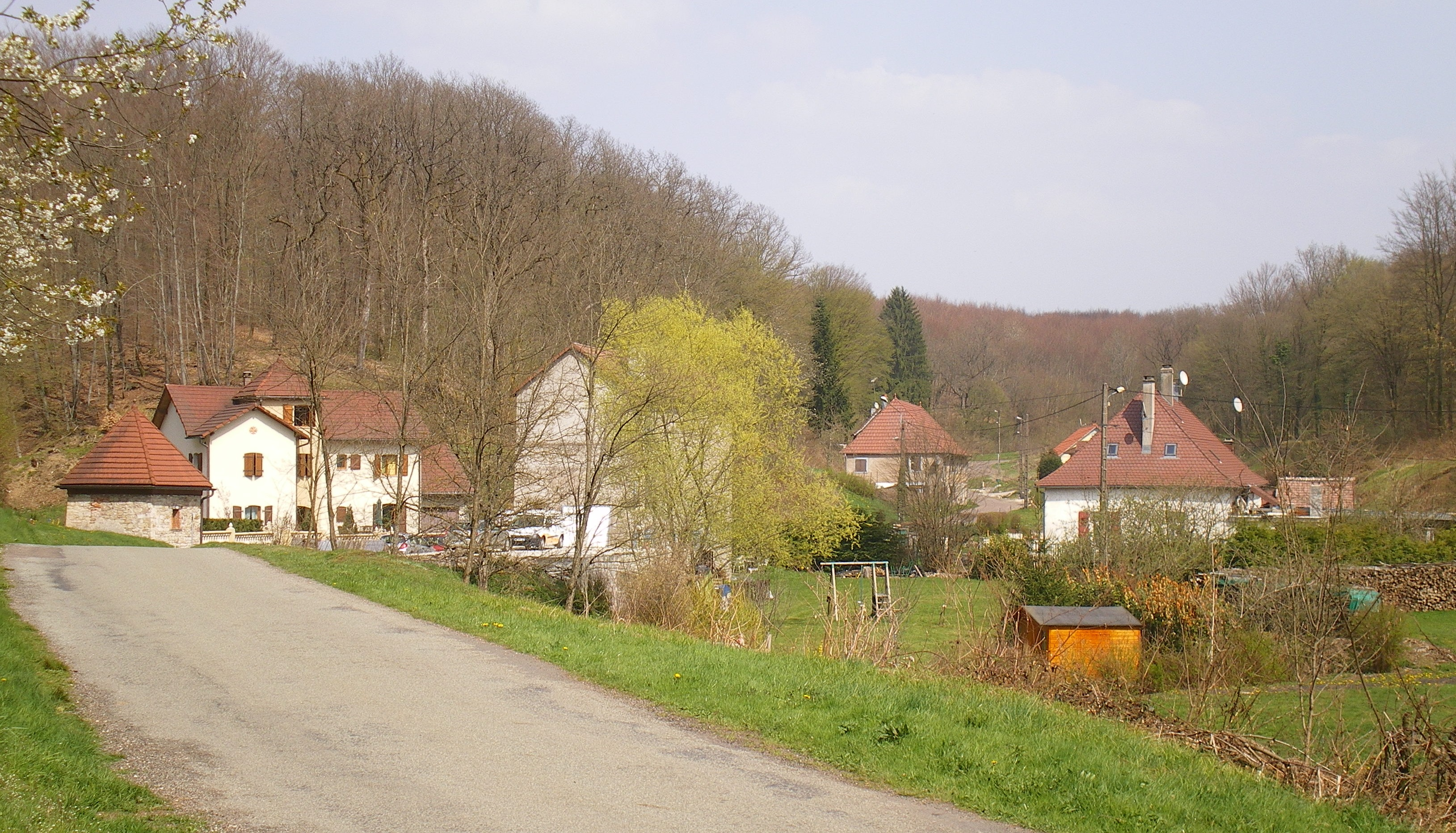
The hamlet of La Houillère.

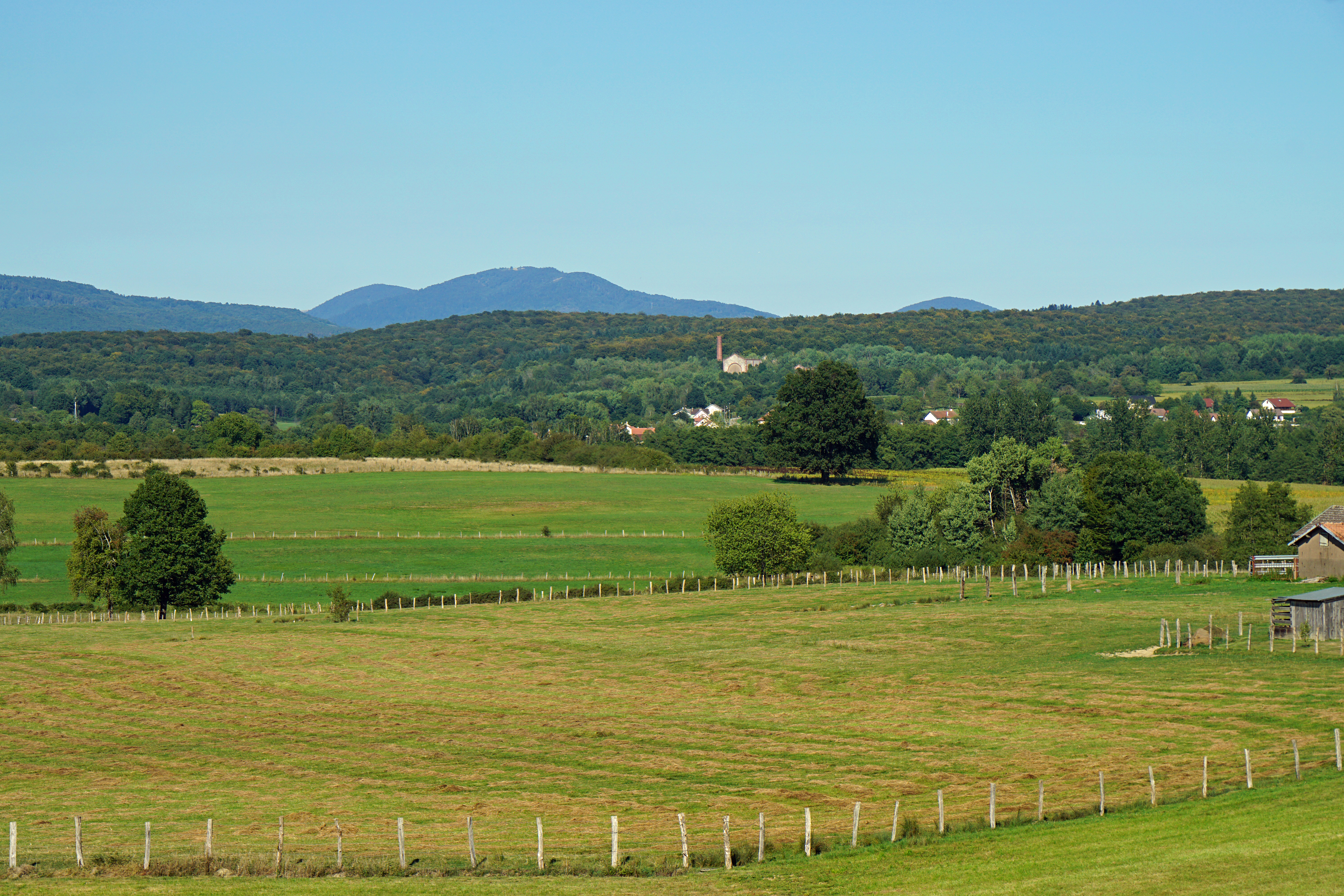
Landscape of the plain located to the south of the mining basin where the ruins of the Arthur-de-Buyer coal mine are visible.

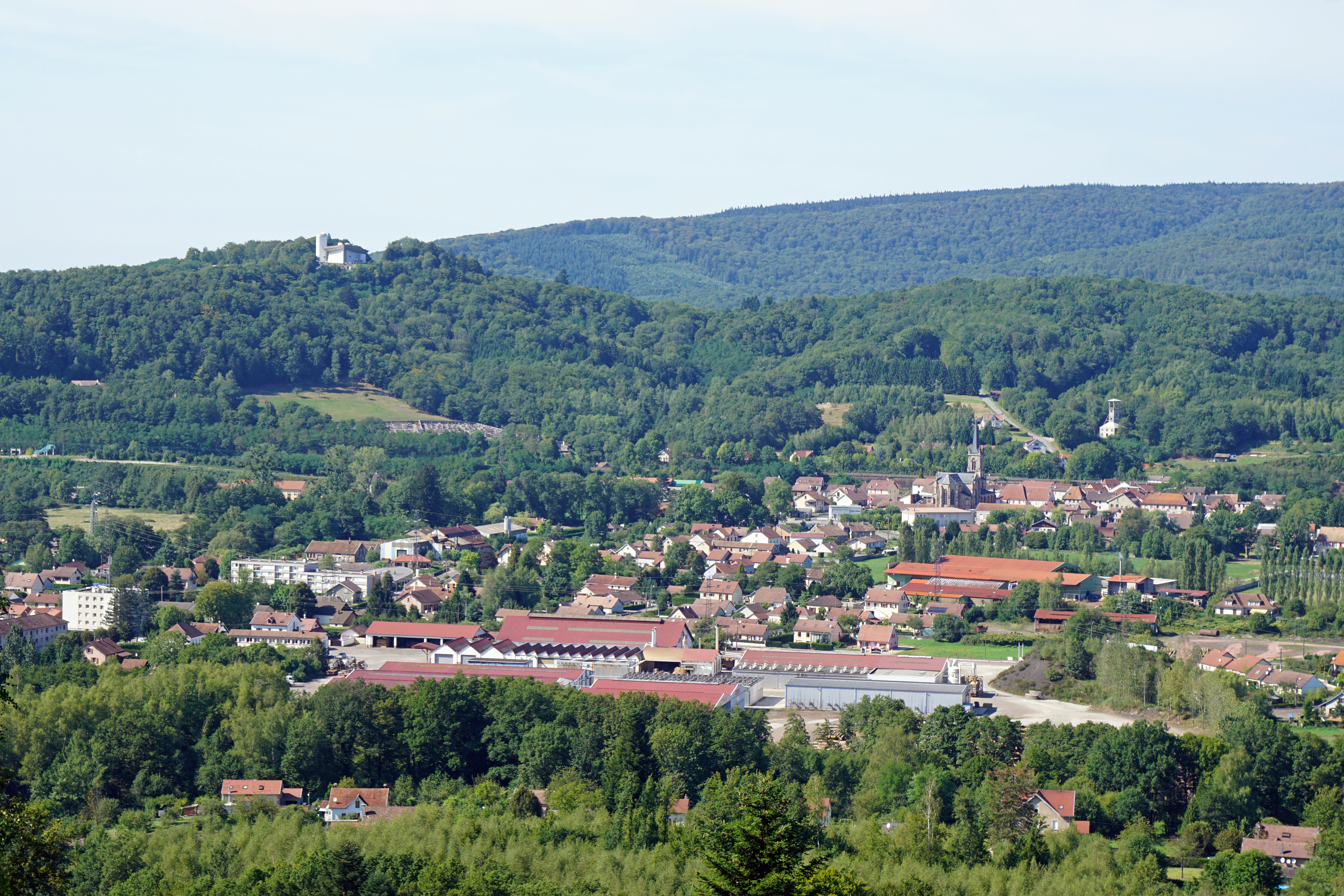
General view of Ronchamp, where the landscape is very hilly with the Bourlémont hill.

== Exploitation ==
This mining basin was exploited for its coal-rich subsoil for two centuries, from the mid-18th century to the mid-20th century. Exploitation started in galleries on the hillside before the Saint-Louis Coal Mine was dug in 1810. It was the first real extraction coal mine of the mining basin. As the coal layers sank deeper, coal mines succeeded each other and became deeper and deeper until the company ended up digging the deepest coal mine in France twice; the Magny coal mine (694 meters) in 1878 and the Arthur-de-Buyer coal mine (1,010 meters) in 1900. At the nationalization of mines in 1946, the active coal mines and the thermal power plant were entrusted to Électricité de France. A small deposit located near the hamlet of Mourière was exploited between 1844 and 1891 but in an artisanal way with thin layers of poor quality.

== Culture and Social Aspects ==
Mining has deeply marked the landscape with its slag heaps, mining towns, and mine coal mines, but also the local economy and population (Polish immigration and mining traditions in particular).

Some municipalities in the mining basin are considered by INSEE to be part of the same living area.

== Sequels ==
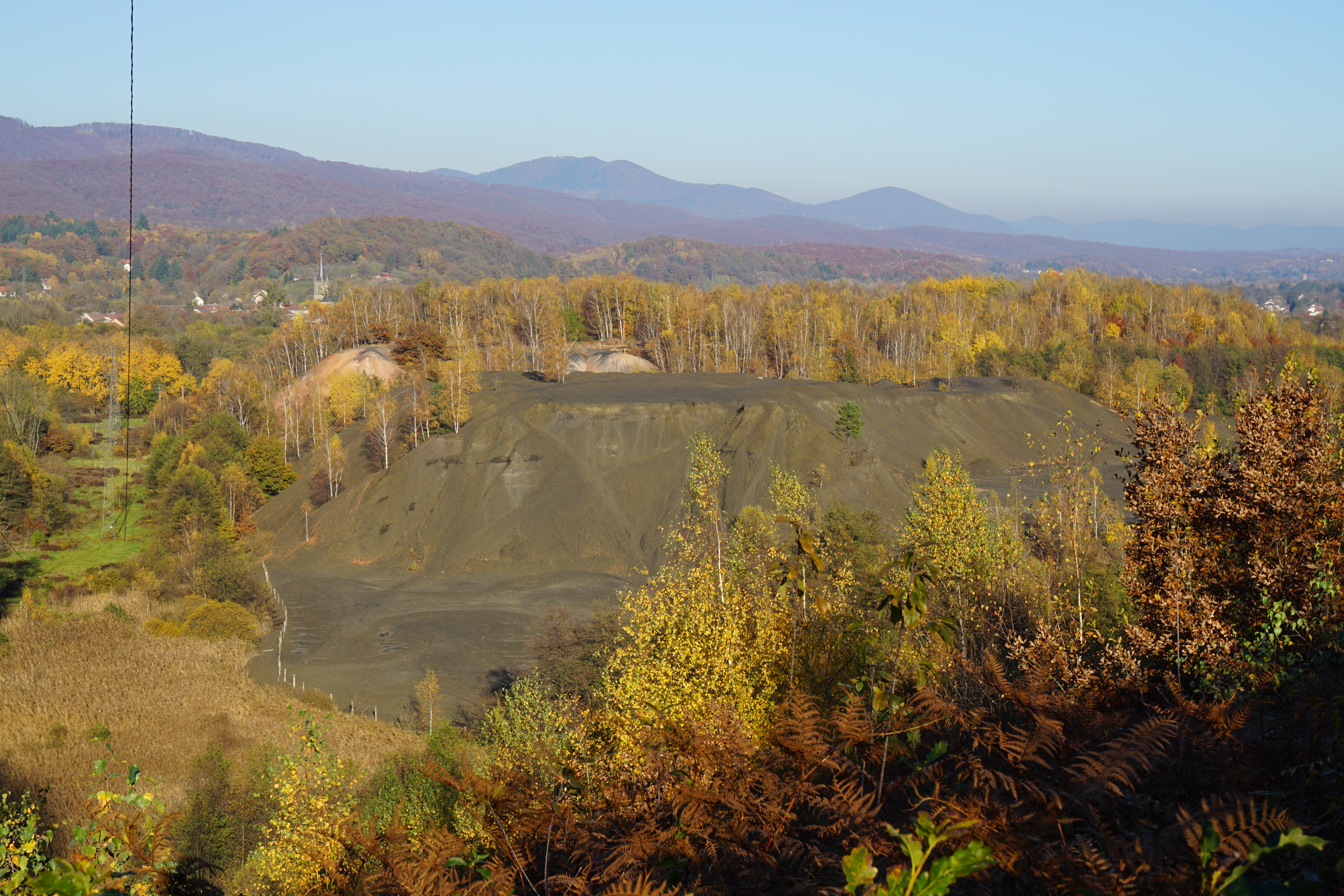
Landscape of the mining basin with the slag heaps of Chanois and the Vosges mountains.

After the closure in 1958, the mining sites were secured, most of the infrastructure was demolished, and the workers were converted to other activities. Later, a museum and two associations were created to preserve the memory of this mining past; several sites were redeveloped to become visitable.

== Tributes ==
In addition to the Marcel-Maulini mining museum and the headframe of the Sainte-Marie coal mine, several fixed monuments and urban decorations pay tribute to coal mining. At outcrops is the mine memorial, which represents the coal mines of the mining basin; it was installed in 2004 and inaugurated on September 24, 2005. Its keyhole shape evokes the "key" to the economic development of Ronchamp, which is coal extraction. The stele installed in 2008 for the fiftieth anniversary of the Étançon disaster pays tribute to the victims.

Fixed monuments

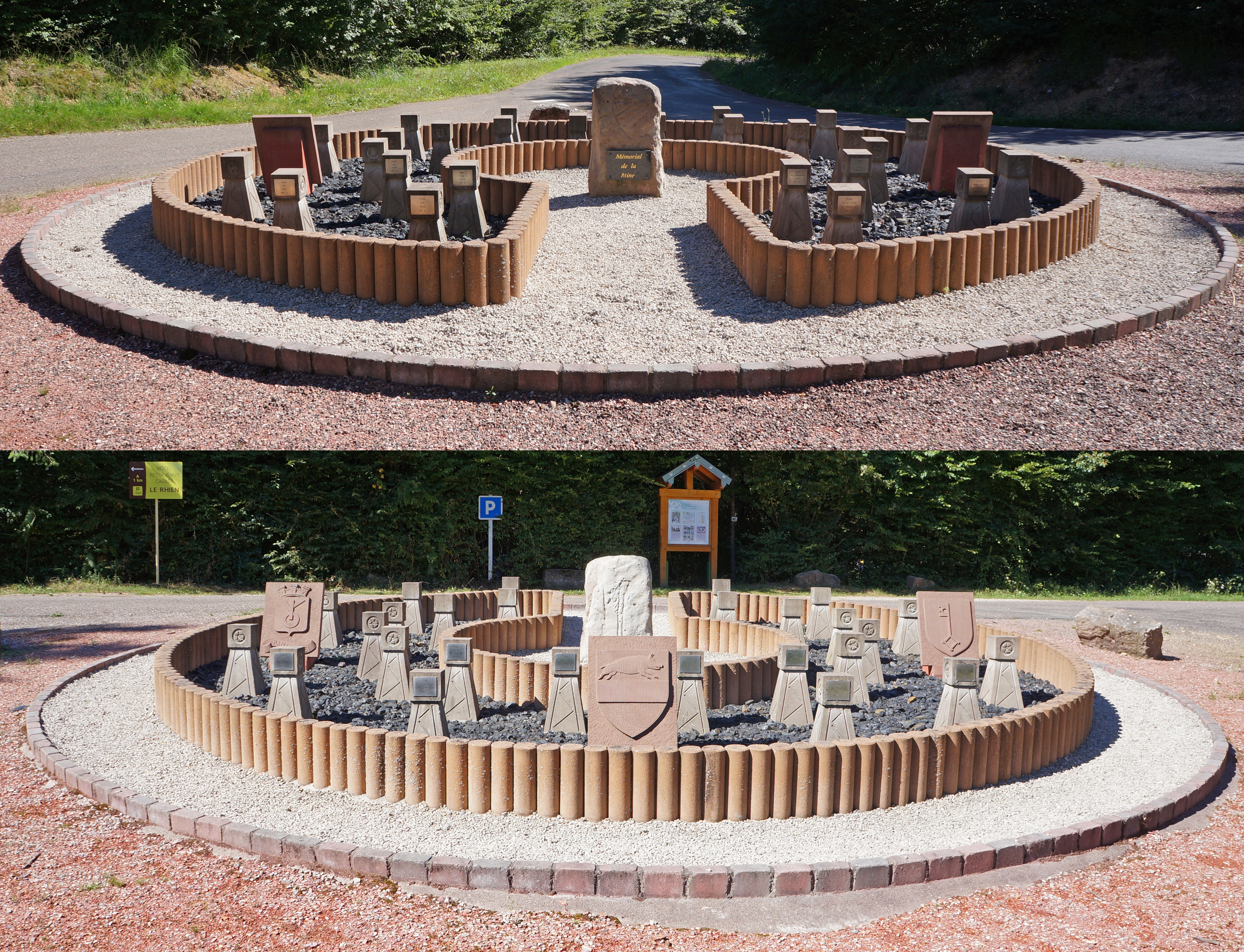
The mine memorial.

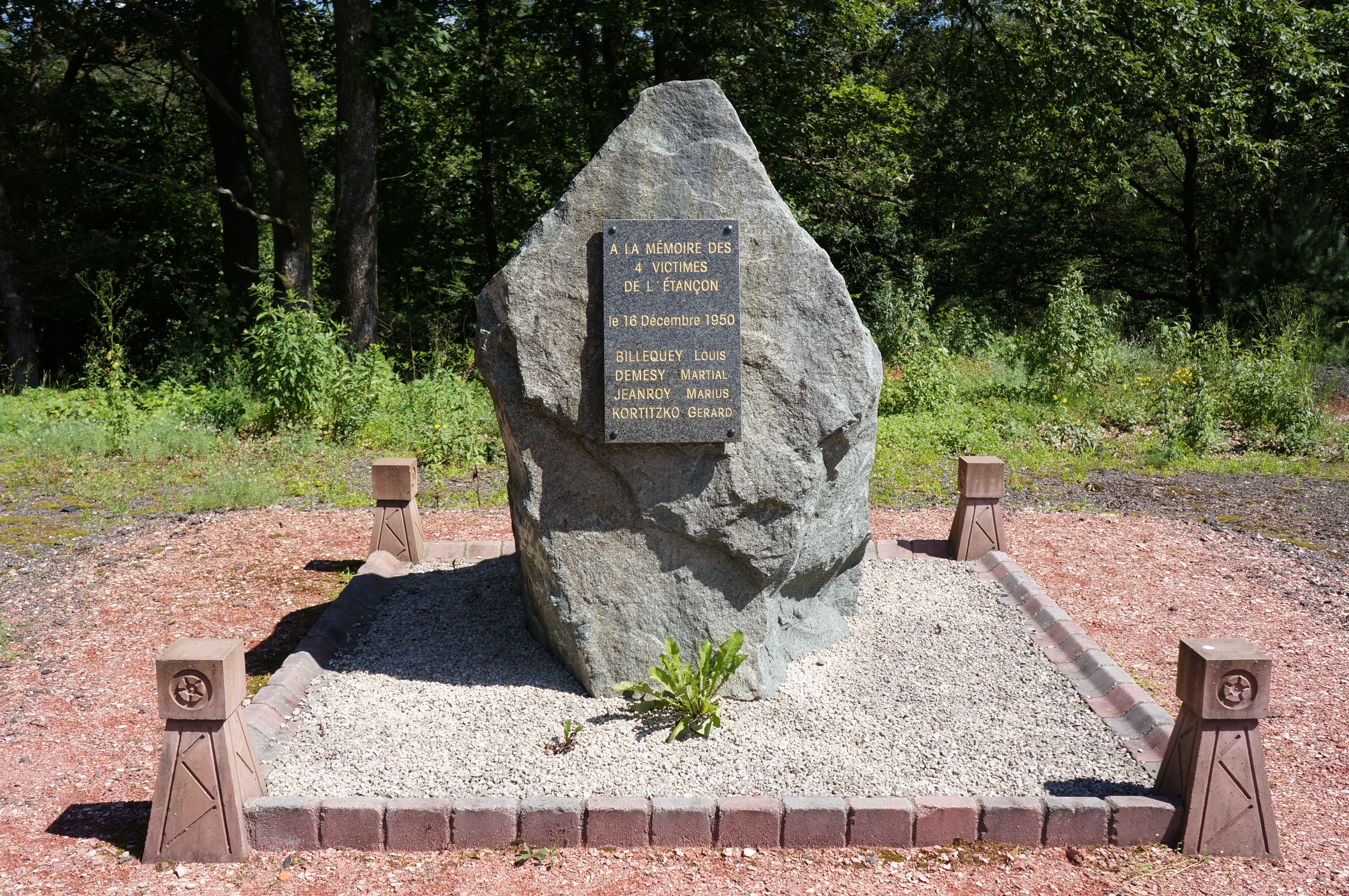
The stele of the Étançon disaster.

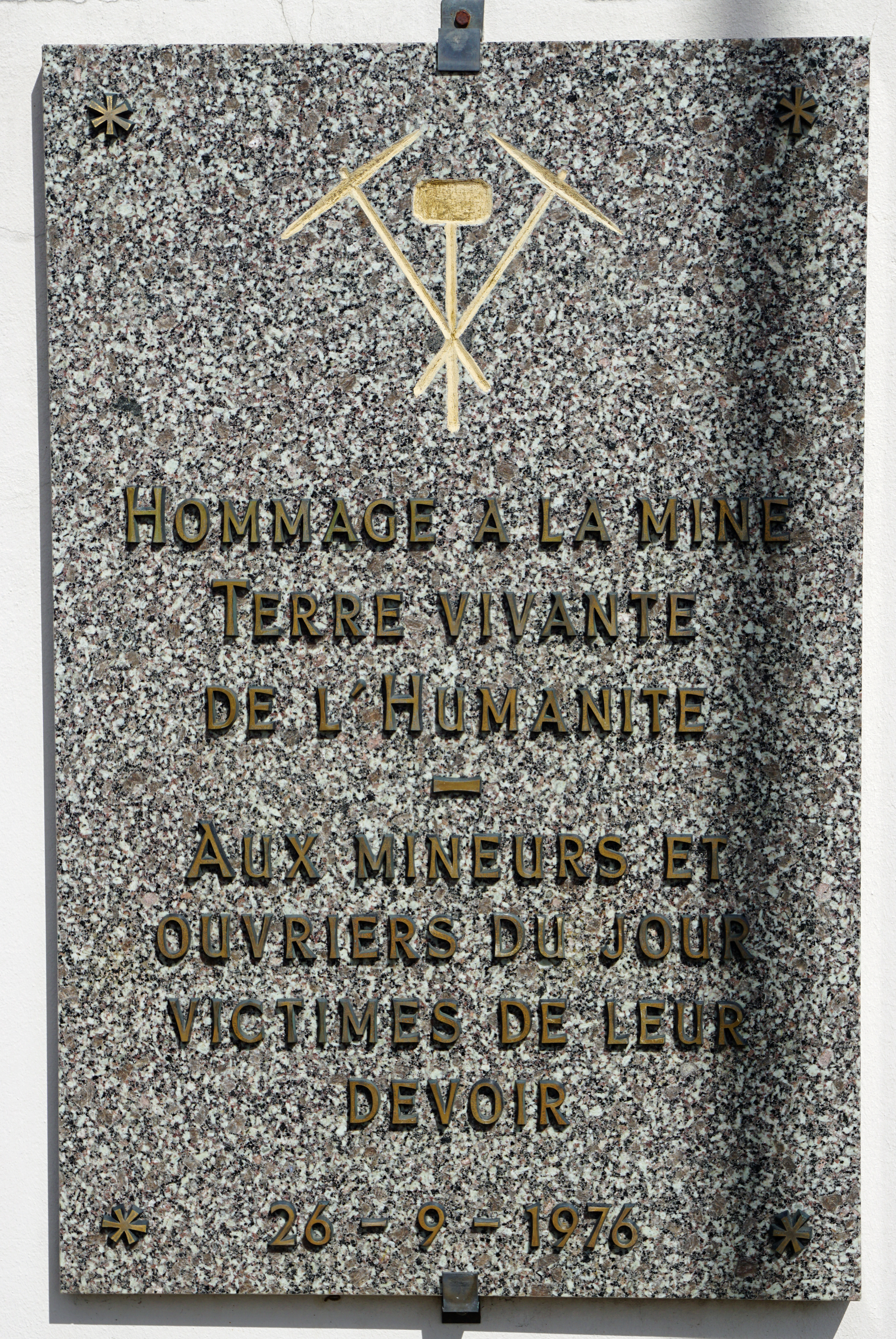
Plaque of the museum.

The municipality of Ronchamp has a war memorial from the 1870 war, erected in the Square of the French Memory and Resistance. This monument, inaugurated in 1904 by François-Xavier Niessen, founder of the French Memory, has the particularity of being dedicated to both war victims and those of labor. The Cube des Prêles was built in 1990 in the city center to evoke the formation of coal. On the other side of the church, a bas-relief paying tribute to the work of miners was installed by Agnès Descamps in 2002.

Sculptures

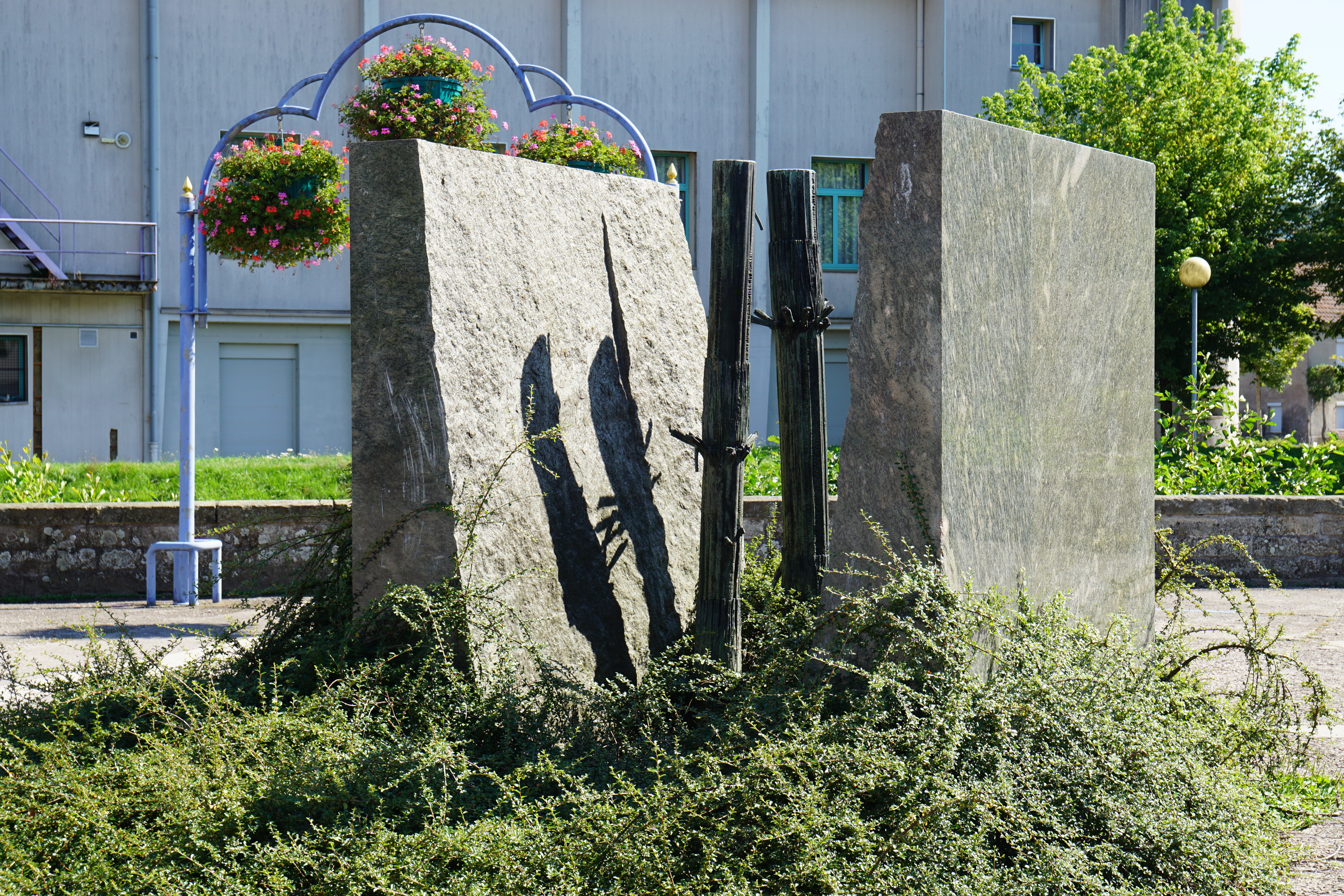
The Cube des Prêles.

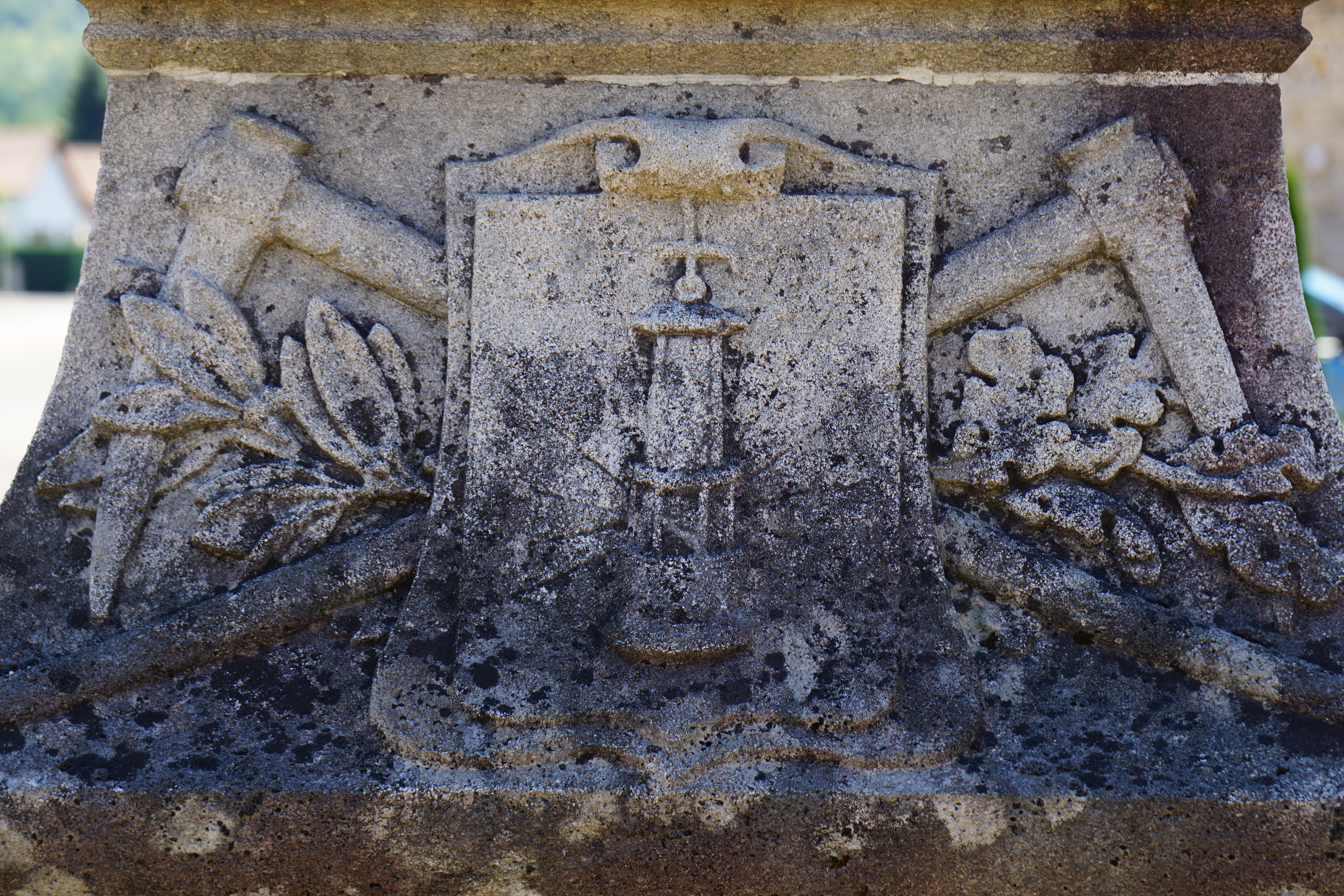
Symbols of the coal mines on the war memorial of 1870.

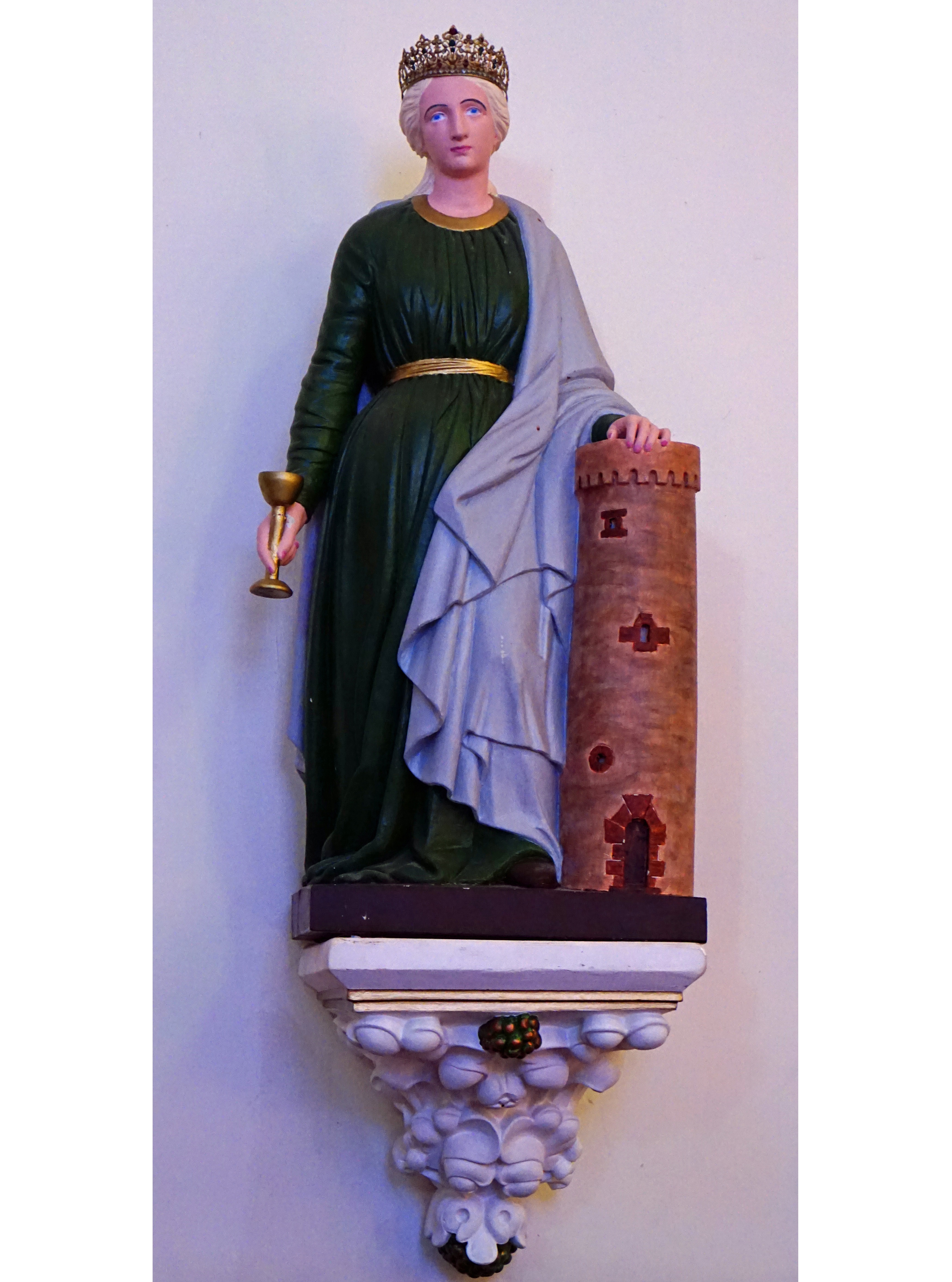
Saint Barbara in the church of Ronchamp.

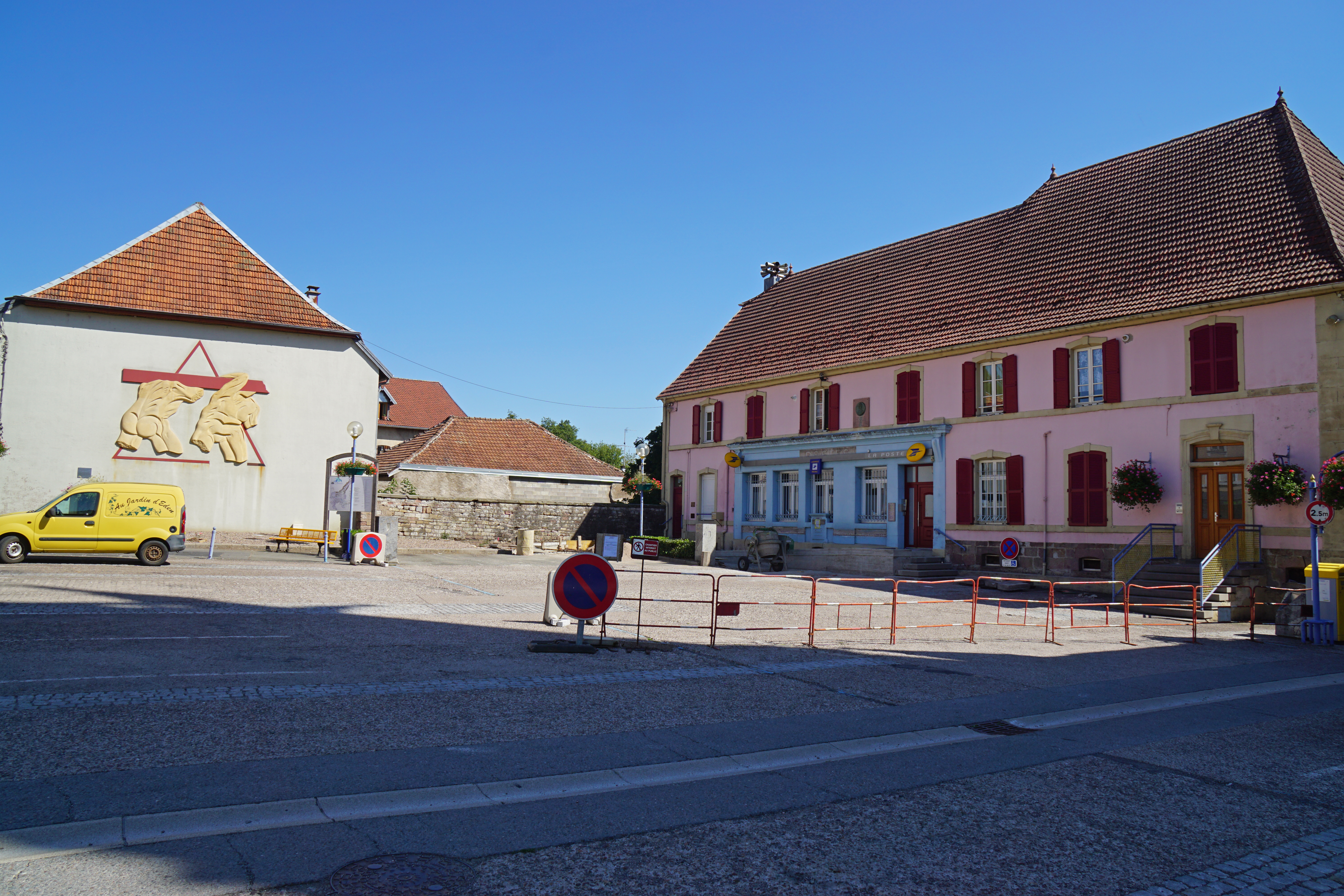
The bas-relief dedicated to miners, to the left of the church square.

Mine carts purchased by the municipality of Ronchamp from the city of Montceau-les-Mines are placed along the RD 619, near important places in the municipality and on former mining sites. A monument was installed in 2012 in front of the Saint-Louis Coal Mine, in the Houillère hamlet, recalling the first mining works.

Urban decorations

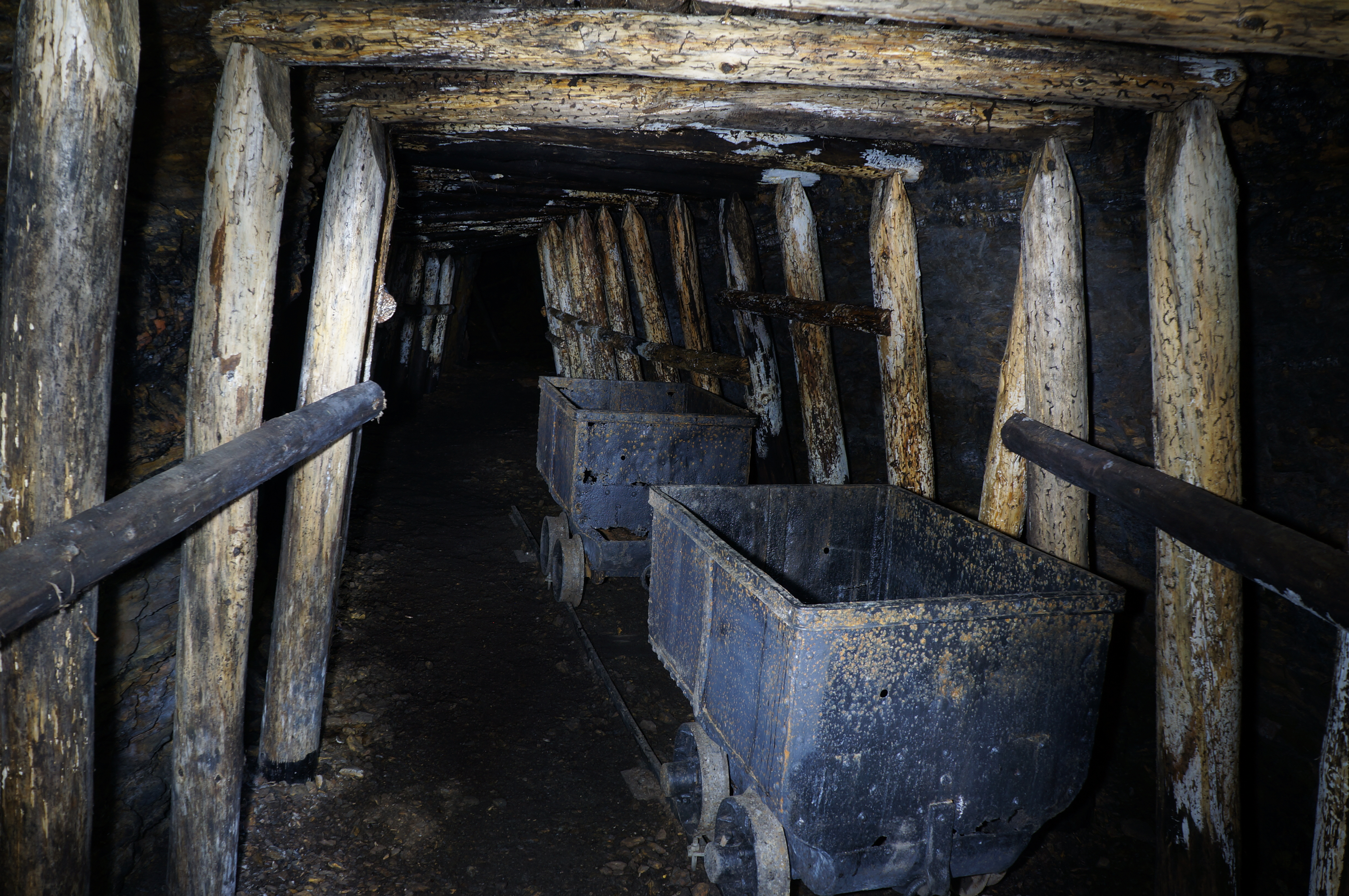
Authentic mine carts from Ronchamp in Gallery 780.

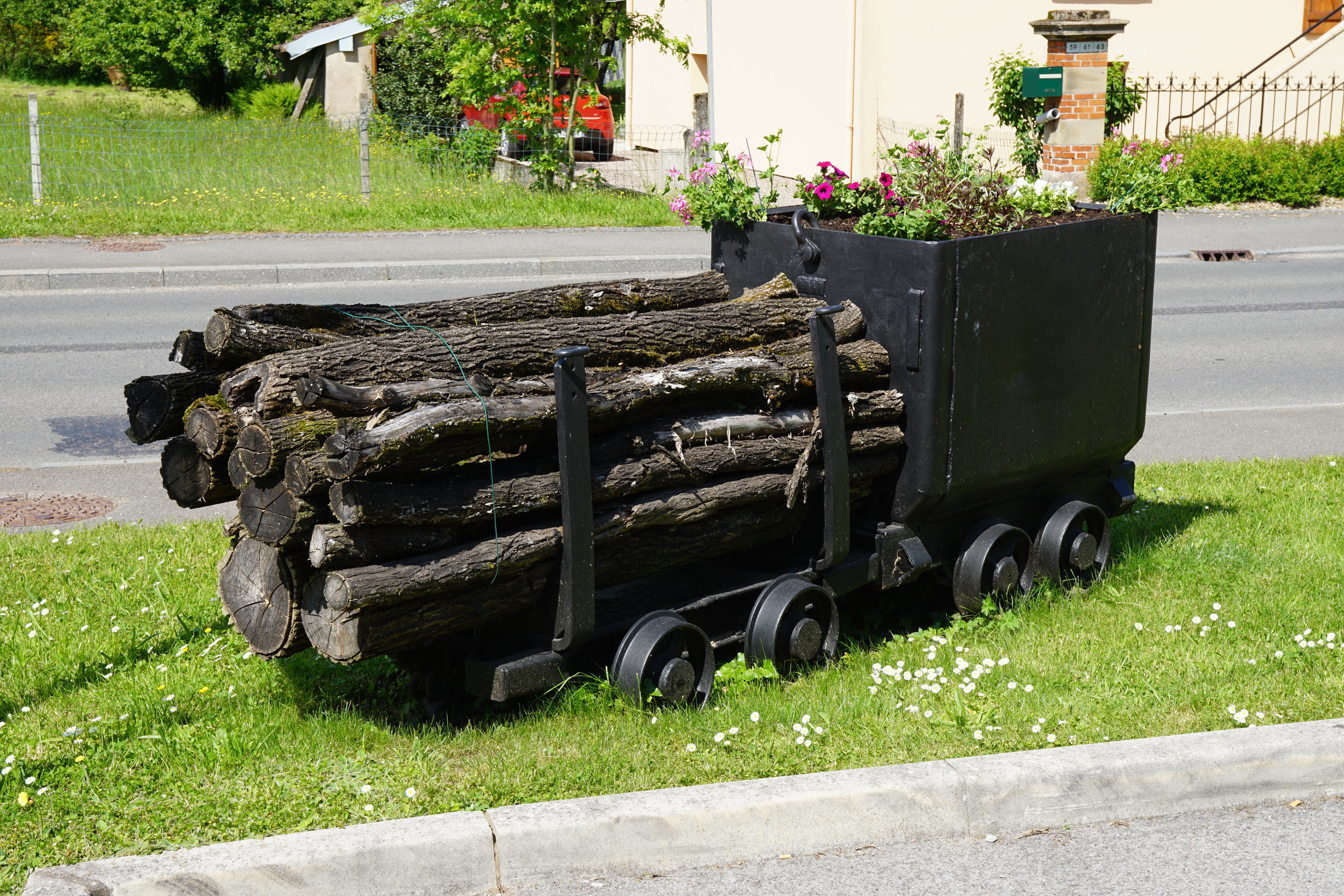
Two mine carts, at the edge of the RD 619.

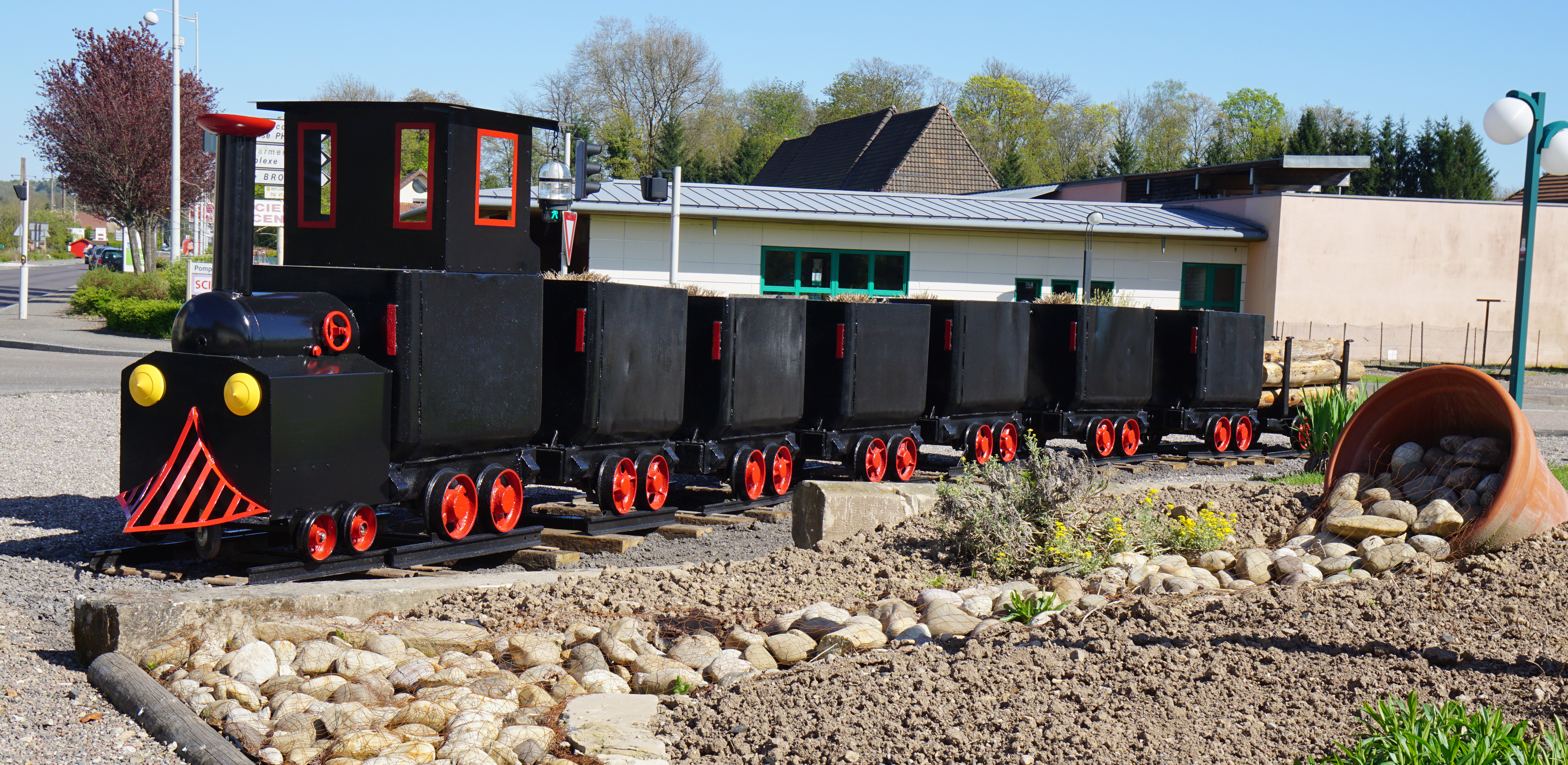
Another train at the Square of the French Memory and Resistance.

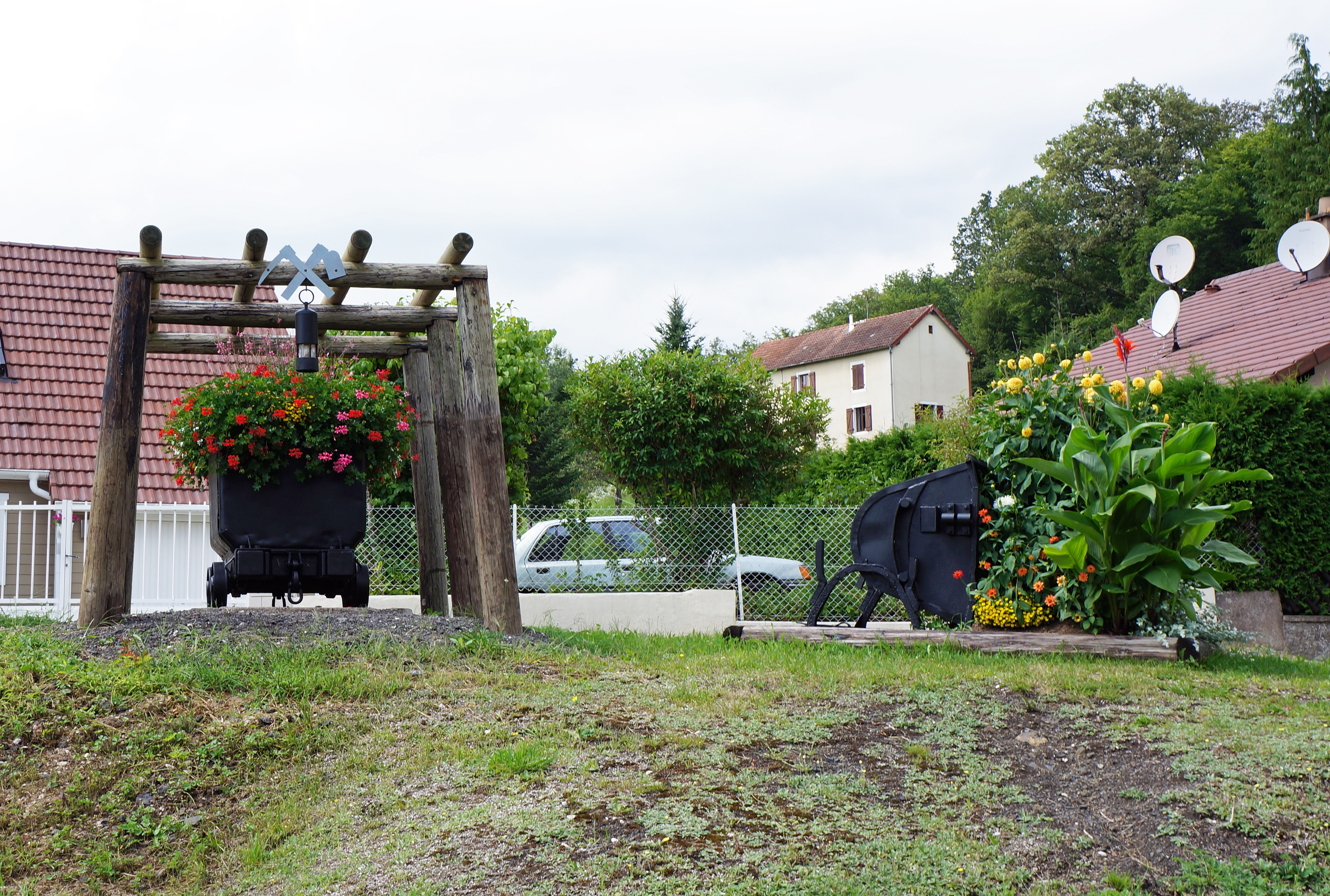
The monument in the hamlet of La Houillère.

The Amicale des Houillères was created in October 1976 at the initiative of Marcel Maulini to preserve the social and cultural heritage derived from mining (including the feast of Saint Barbara).

== Bibliography ==
- Parietti, Jean-Jacques (2001). Les Houillères de Ronchamp vol. I : La mine (in French). Éditions Comtoises. ISBN 2-914425-08-2.
- Parietti, Jean-Jacques (2010). Les Houillères de Ronchamp vol. II : Les mineurs (in French). Fc culture & patrimoine. ISBN 978-2-36230-001-1.
- Macquat, Arnaud; Stokoe, Simon (2005). Terrain urbain Ronchamp : La dimension matérielle et les acteurs du patrimoine minier de Ronchamp (PDF) (in French). Institut de géographie de l'Université de Neuchâtel.
- Parietti, Jean-Jacques (1999). Les dossiers de la Houillère 1 : Le puits Sainte Marie (in French). Association des amis du musée de la mine.
- Parietti, Jean-Jacques (1999). Les dossiers de la Houillère 2 : Le puits Arthur de Buyer (in French). Association des amis du musée de la mine.
- Parietti, Jean-Jacques (1999). Les dossiers de la Houillère 3 : Le puits Saint Charles (in French). Association des amis du musée de la mine. OCLC 468800722.
- Parietti, Jean-Jacques (1999). Les dossiers de la Houillère 4 : Le puits d'Eboulet (in French). Association des amis du musée de la mine. OCLC 468800725.
- Parietti, Jean-Jacques (1999). Les dossiers de la Houillère 5 : Le puits du Magny (in French). Association des amis du musée de la mine.
- Parietti, Jean-Jacques (2016). Le puits de l'Étançon. Les dossiers de la Houillère (in French). Association des amis du musée de la mine.
- PNRBV (1999). Le charbon de Ronchamp (in French). Parc naturel régional des Ballons des Vosges. ISBN 978-2-910328-31-3.
