= Pierre-Joseph Desault =

French anatomist and surgeon

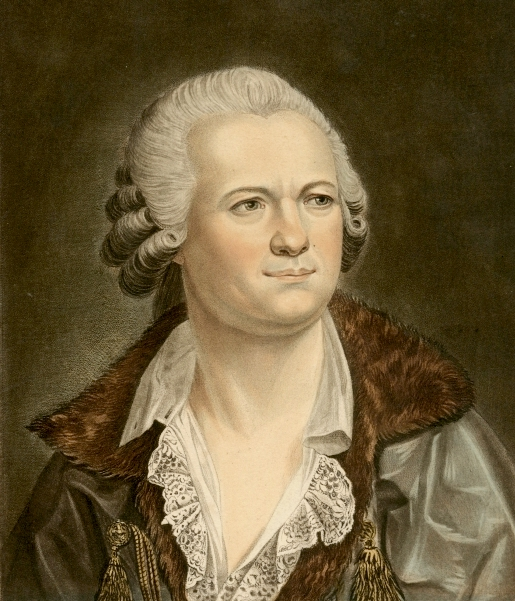
- Born: 6 February 1738; Vouhenans, France
- Died: 1 June 1795 (aged 57); Paris, France
- Scientific career
- Fields: Anatomy; Surgery

Signature
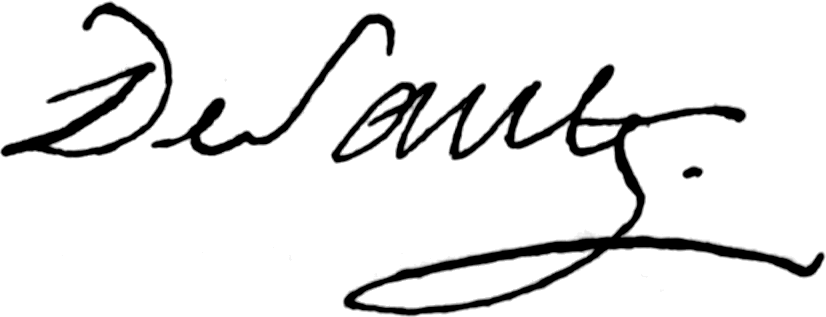

Pierre-Joseph Desault (6 February 1738 – 1 June 1795) was a French anatomist and surgeon.

== Biography ==
Pierre-Joseph Desault was born in Vouhenans, Franche-Comté. He was destined for a career in the Church, but his own inclination was towards the study of medicine; after learning something from the barber-surgeon of his native village, he was settled as an apprentice in the military hospital of Belfort, where he acquired some knowledge of anatomy and military surgery. Going to Paris at about twenty years of age, he later opened a school of anatomy there in the winter of 1766, the success of which excited the jealousy of the established teachers and professors, who tried to make him give up his lectures. In 1776 he was admitted as a member of the Corps of Surgeons; and in 1782 he was appointed Surgeon Major to the Hospital of Charity.

In 1784, Desault moved to the Hôtel-Dieu to participate in a major ancien régime experiments in surgical education. Within a few years he was recognized as one of the leading surgeons of France. The clinical school of surgery which he instituted at the Hôtel-Dieu attracted great numbers of students, not only from every part of France (Pierre Bouchet from Lyon for example) but also from other countries; and he frequently had an audience of about 100. In fact, it was praised by his pupil Xavier Bichat as the best surgical school in Europe. Desault introduced many improvements to the practice of surgery, as well as to the construction of surgical instruments. In 1791 he established a Journal de chirurgerie, edited by his pupils, which was a record of the most interesting cases that had occurred in his clinical school, with the remarks which he had made upon them in the course of his lectures.

In the midst of his labors, however, he became obnoxious to some of the Revolutionary authorities, and he was, on some frivolous charge, denounced to the government. After being twice examined, he was seized on 28 May 1793, in the midst of delivering a lecture, carried away from his surgical theatre, and committed to prison in the Luxembourg. In three days, however, he was liberated, and permitted to resume his functions. On 31 May 1795 he was summoned to attend to the young Louis XVII by the latter's prisonguards, due to his severe illness. Desault died the next day, before he could visit the King. The rumour that his death was caused by poisoning during this summons was disproved by the autopsy carried out by his pupil Bichat. A pension was settled on his widow by the Republic.

== Works ==
Together with François Chopart (1743–1795), he published Traité des maladies chirurgicales (1779), and Bichat published a digest of his surgical doctrines in OEuvres chirurgicales de Desault (1798–1799).
