= Roye, Haute-Saône =

Roye
- Commune
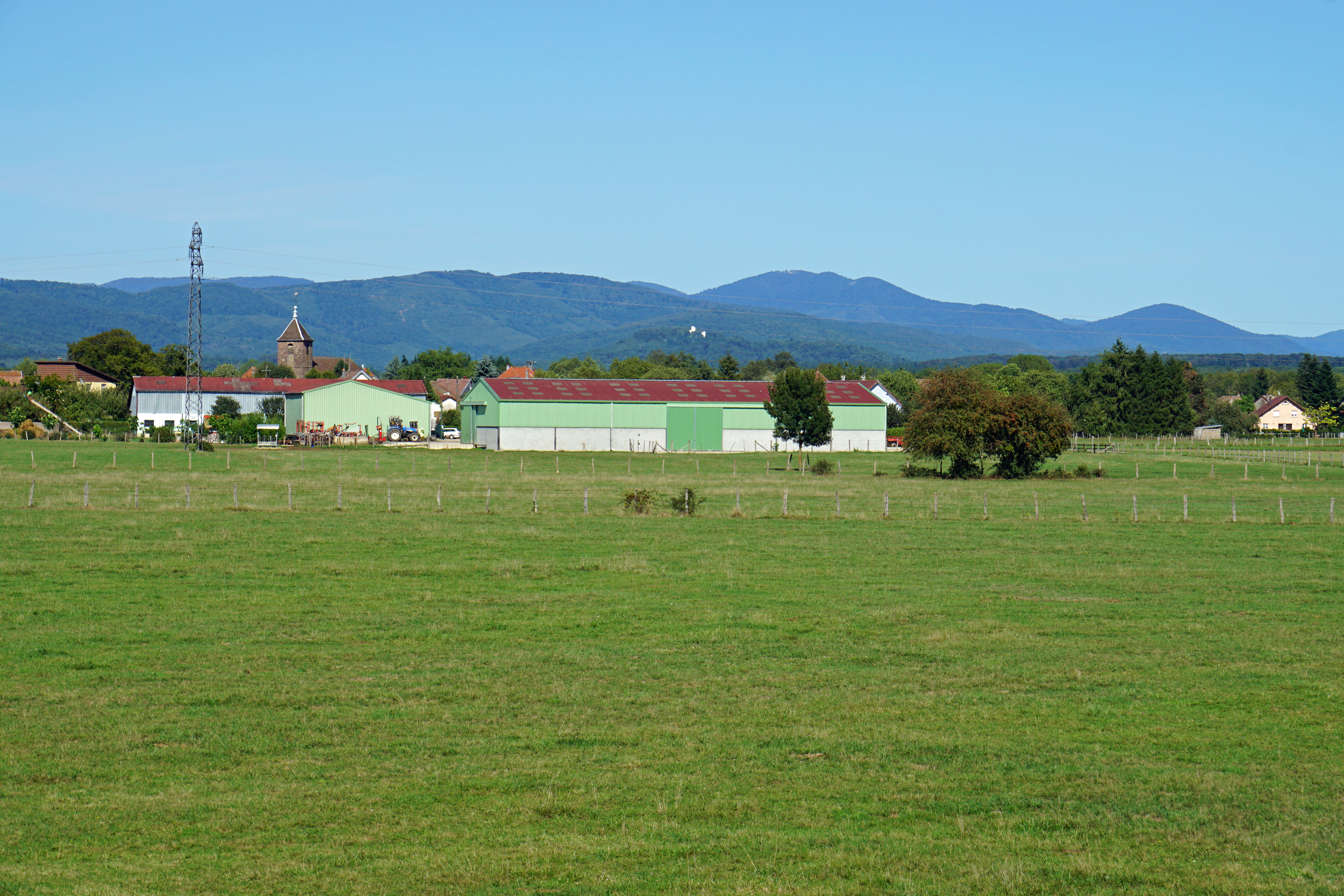
- Plaine de Roy between La Côte and Roye

- Coat of arms
- Location of Roye
- Location within France Location within Bourgogne-Franche-Comté
- Coordinates: 47°40′12″N 6°32′37″E
- Country: France
- Region: Bourgogne-Franche-Comté
- Department: Haute-Saône
- Arrondissement: Lure
- Canton: Lure-2
- Area^{1}: 10.37 km^{2} (4.00 sq mi)
- Highest elevation: 333 m (1,093 ft)
- Lowest elevation: 293 m (961 ft)
- Population (2023): 1,484
  - Density: 143.1/km^{2} (370.6/sq mi)
- Time zone: UTC+01:00 (CET)
  - Summer (DST): UTC+02:00 (CEST)
- INSEE/Postal code: 70455 /70200
- ^{1} French Land Register data, which excludes lakes, ponds, glaciers > 1 km^{2} (0.386 sq mi or 247 acres) and river estuaries.

Roye is a commune in the Haute-Saône department in the region of Bourgogne-Franche-Comté in eastern France.

== See also ==
- Communes of the Haute-Saône department
