= Pomoy =

- Commune
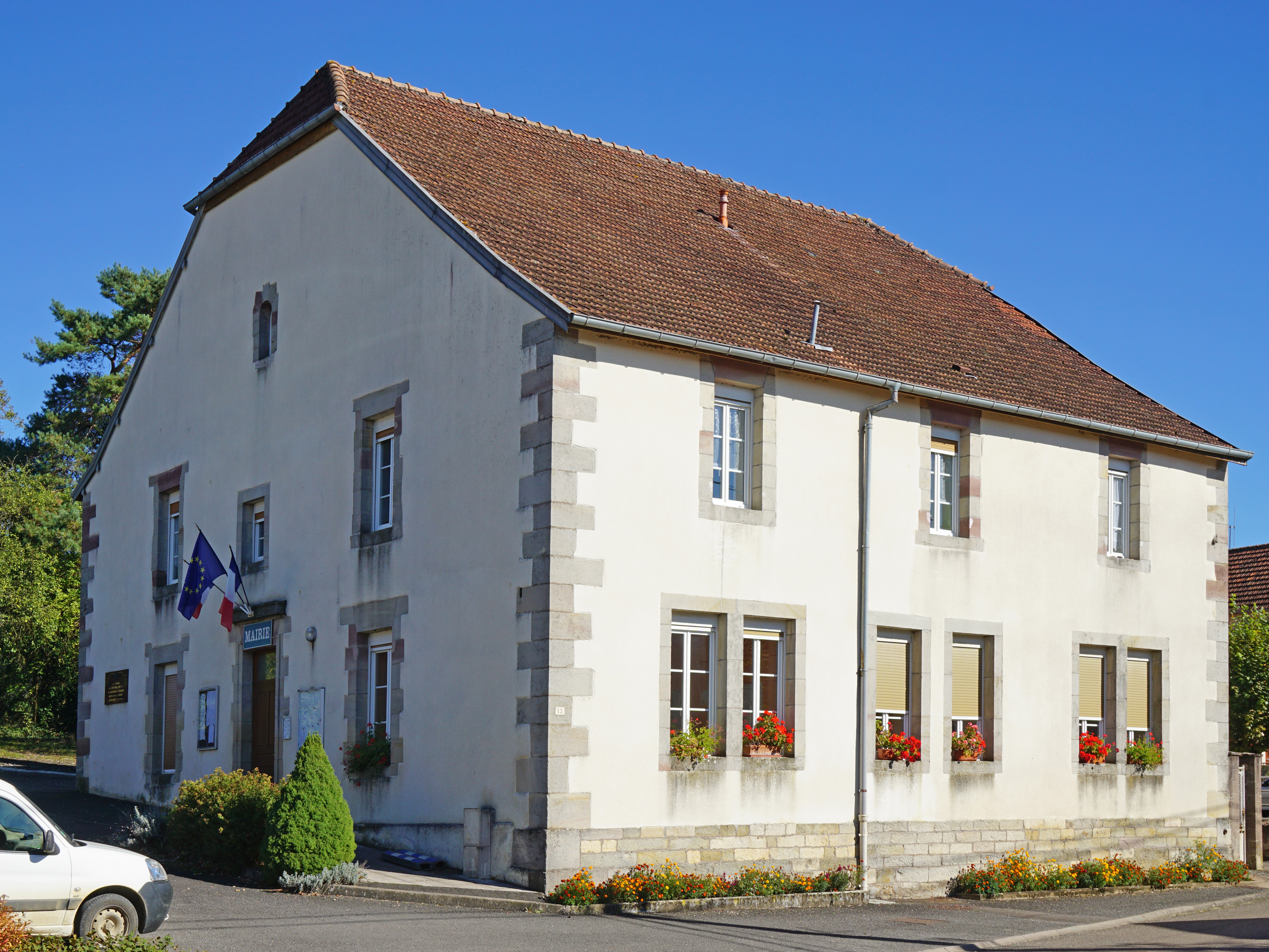
- The town hall in Pomoy

- Coat of arms
- Location of Pomoy
- Location within France Location within Bourgogne-Franche-Comté
- Coordinates: 47°39′47″N 6°21′15″E
- Country: France
- Region: Bourgogne-Franche-Comté
- Department: Haute-Saône
- Arrondissement: Lure
- Canton: Lure-2

Government
  - Mayor (2022–2026): Jean-Noël Devillers
- Area^{1}: 7.51 km^{2} (2.90 sq mi)
- Highest elevation: 393 m (1,289 ft)
- Lowest elevation: 289 m (948 ft)
- Population (2023): 197
  - Density: 26.2/km^{2} (67.9/sq mi)
- Time zone: UTC+01:00 (CET)
  - Summer (DST): UTC+02:00 (CEST)
- INSEE/Postal code: 70416 /70240
- ^{1} French Land Register data, which excludes lakes, ponds, glaciers > 1 km^{2} (0.386 sq mi or 247 acres) and river estuaries.

Pomoy (French pronunciation: [pɔmwa]) is a commune in the Haute-Saône department in the region of Bourgogne-Franche-Comté in eastern France.

== See also ==
- Communes of the Haute-Saône department
