= Faymont =

- Commune
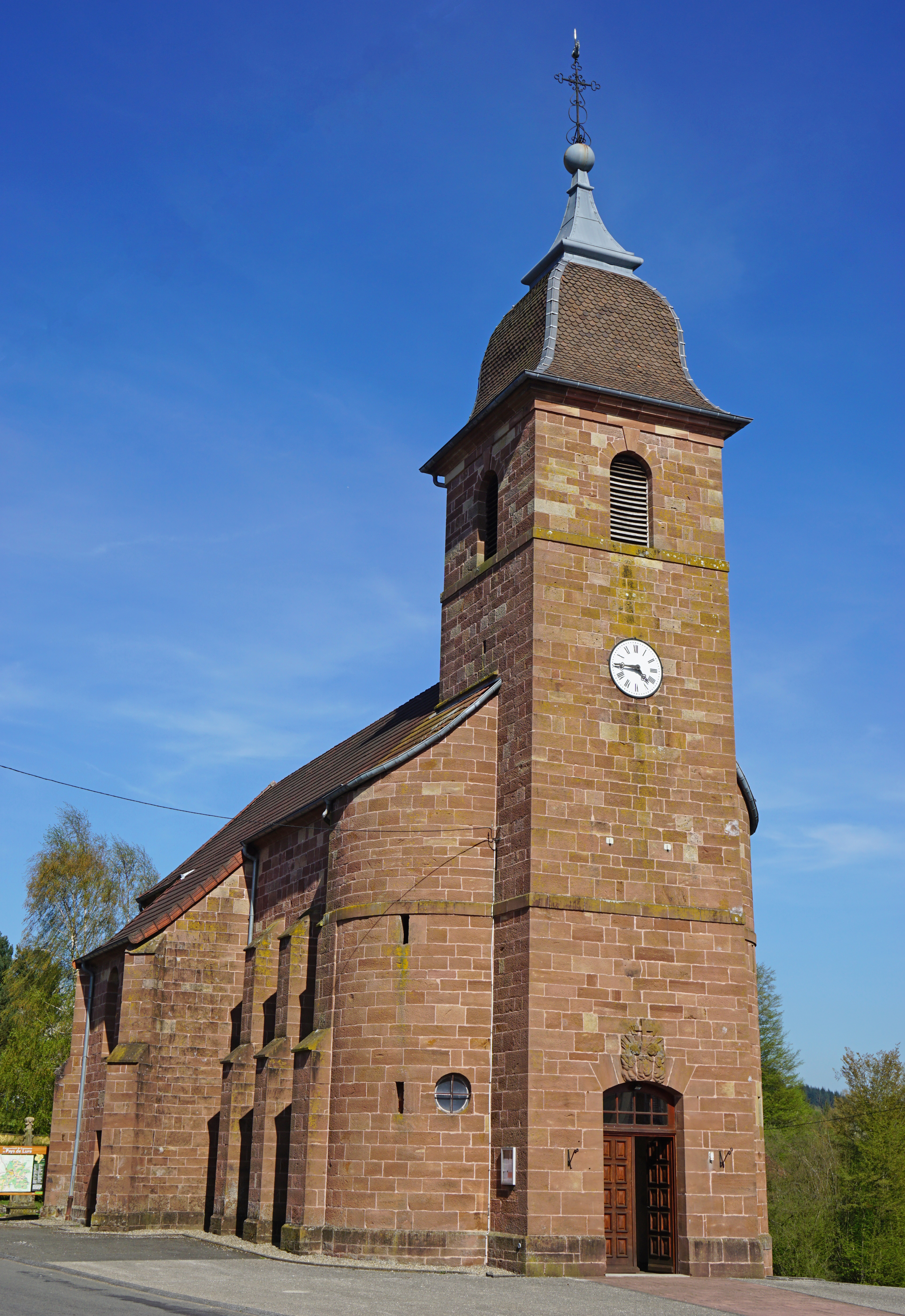
- The church in Faymont
- Location of Faymont
- Location within France Location within Bourgogne-Franche-Comté
- Coordinates: 47°36′37″N 6°35′41″E
- Country: France
- Region: Bourgogne-Franche-Comté
- Department: Haute-Saône
- Arrondissement: Lure
- Canton: Lure-2
- Area^{1}: 7.99 km^{2} (3.08 sq mi)
- Highest elevation: 451 m (1,480 ft)
- Lowest elevation: 295 m (968 ft)
- Population (2023): 253
  - Density: 31.7/km^{2} (82.0/sq mi)
- Time zone: UTC+01:00 (CET)
  - Summer (DST): UTC+02:00 (CEST)
- INSEE/Postal code: 70229 /70200
- ^{1} French Land Register data, which excludes lakes, ponds, glaciers > 1 km^{2} (0.386 sq mi or 247 acres) and river estuaries.

Faymont (French pronunciation: [femɔ̃]) is a commune in the Haute-Saône department in the region of Bourgogne-Franche-Comté in eastern France.

== See also ==
- Communes of the Haute-Saône department
