= Les Aynans =

- Commune
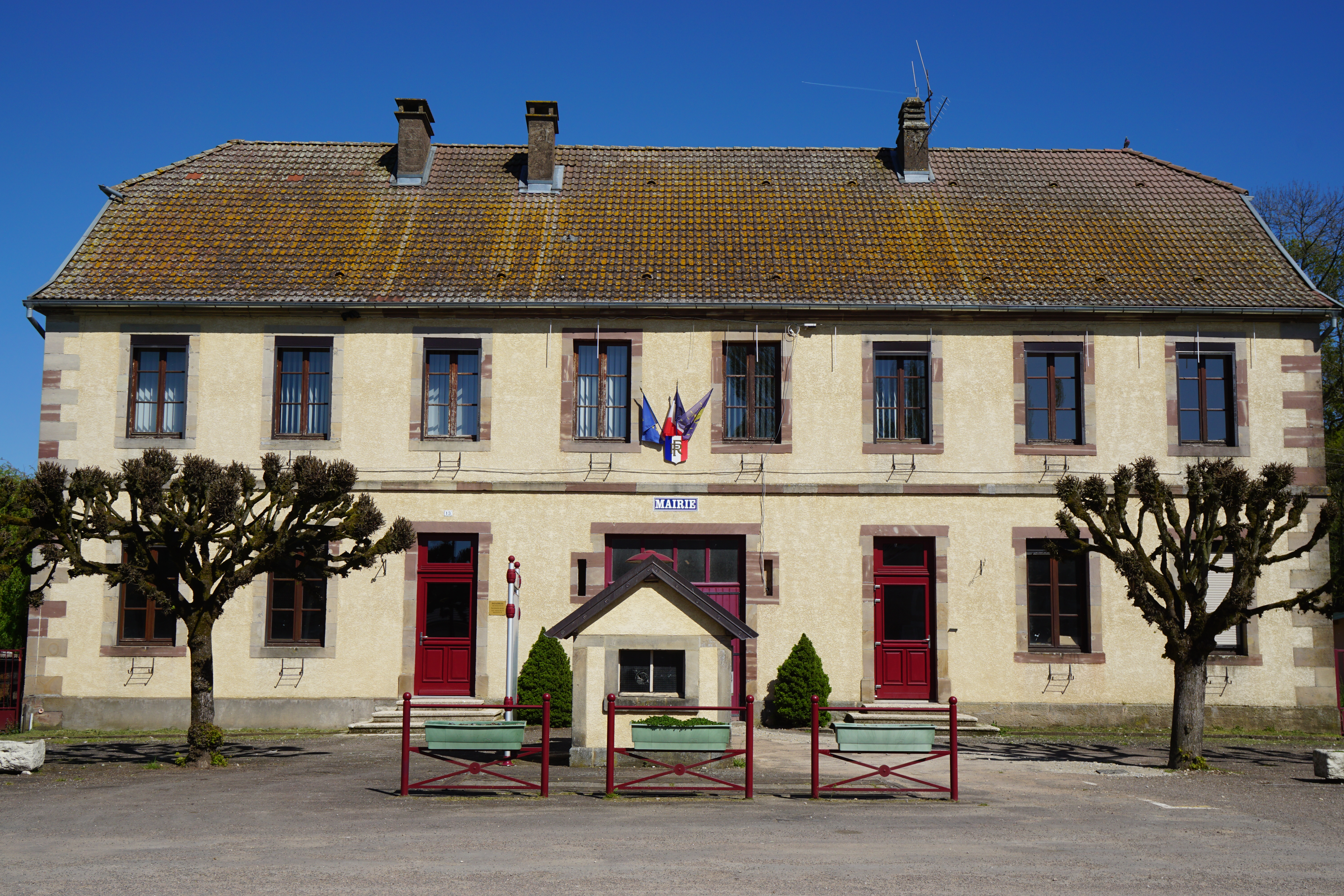
- The town hall in Les Aynans

- Coat of arms
- Location of Les Aynans
- Location within France Location within Bourgogne-Franche-Comté
- Coordinates: 47°37′18″N 6°27′12″E
- Country: France
- Region: Bourgogne-Franche-Comté
- Department: Haute-Saône
- Arrondissement: Lure
- Canton: Lure-2

Government
  - Mayor (2020–2026): Gilles Marsot
- Area^{1}: 7.82 km^{2} (3.02 sq mi)
- Highest elevation: 335 m (1,099 ft)
- Lowest elevation: 270 m (890 ft)
- Population (2023): 356
  - Density: 45.5/km^{2} (118/sq mi)
- Time zone: UTC+01:00 (CET)
  - Summer (DST): UTC+02:00 (CEST)
- INSEE/Postal code: 70046 /70200
- ^{1} French Land Register data, which excludes lakes, ponds, glaciers > 1 km^{2} (0.386 sq mi or 247 acres) and river estuaries.

Les Aynans (French pronunciation: [lez‿ɛnɑ̃]) is a commune in the Haute-Saône department in the region of Bourgogne-Franche-Comté in eastern France.

== See also ==
- Communes of the Haute-Saône department
