= Lomont =

- Commune
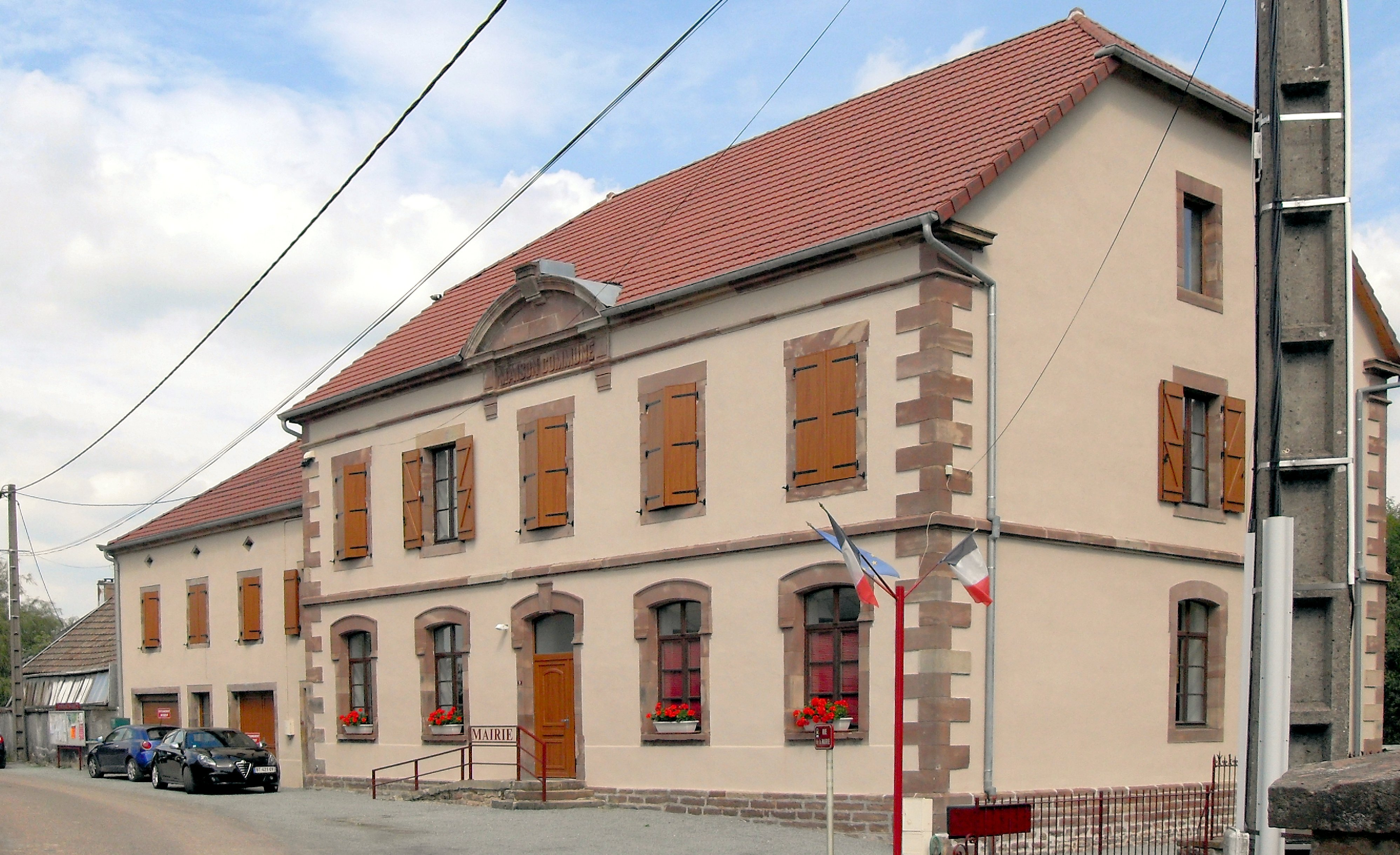
- The town hall in Lomont

- Coat of arms
- Location of Lomont
- Location within France Location within Bourgogne-Franche-Comté
- Coordinates: 47°37′30″N 6°36′52″E
- Country: France
- Region: Bourgogne-Franche-Comté
- Department: Haute-Saône
- Arrondissement: Lure
- Canton: Lure-2

Government
  - Mayor (2020–2026): Michel Chagnot
- Area^{1}: 11.35 km^{2} (4.38 sq mi)
- Highest elevation: 466 m (1,529 ft)
- Lowest elevation: 290 m (950 ft)
- Population (2023): 482
  - Density: 42.5/km^{2} (110/sq mi)
- Time zone: UTC+01:00 (CET)
  - Summer (DST): UTC+02:00 (CEST)
- INSEE/Postal code: 70306 /70200
- ^{1} French Land Register data, which excludes lakes, ponds, glaciers > 1 km^{2} (0.386 sq mi or 247 acres) and river estuaries.

Lomont (French pronunciation: [lɔmɔ̃]) is a commune in the Haute-Saône department in the region of Bourgogne-Franche-Comté in eastern France.

A high power sound broadcasting and television transmitting station is operated by TDF in the forest near the village to serve the greater Besançon area.

== See also ==
- Communes of the Haute-Saône department
