= Canton of Lure-2 =

Coordinates: 47.68°N 6.50°E

The canton of Lure-2 is an administrative division of the Haute-Saône department, northeastern France. It was created at the French canton reorganisation which came into effect in March 2015. Its seat is in Lure.

It consists of the following communes:

1. Amblans-et-Velotte
2. Andornay
3. Arpenans
4. Les Aynans
5. La Côte
6. Faymont
7. Frotey-lès-Lure
8. Genevreuille
9. Lomont
10. Lure (partly)
11. Lyoffans
12. Magny-Danigon
13. Magny-Jobert
14. Magny-Vernois
15. Moffans-et-Vacheresse
16. Mollans
17. Palante
18. Pomoy
19. Roye
20. Le Val-de-Gouhenans
21. Vouhenans
22. Vy-lès-Lure
