= Le Val-de-Gouhenans =

- Commune
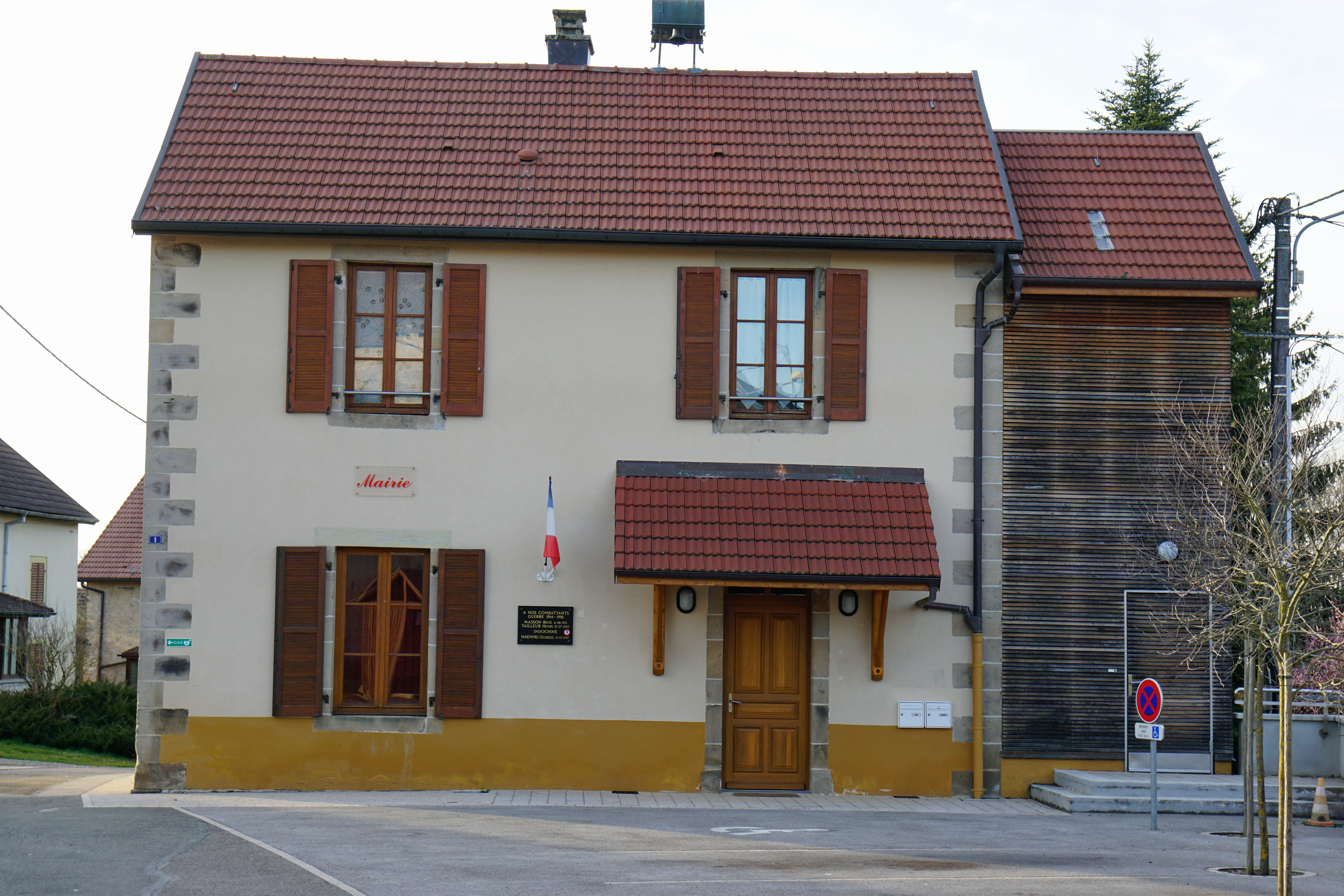
- The town hall in Le Val-de-Gouhenans

- Coat of arms
- Location of Le Val-de-Gouhenans
- Location within France Location within Bourgogne-Franche-Comté
- Coordinates: 47°37′16″N 6°29′09″E
- Country: France
- Region: Bourgogne-Franche-Comté
- Department: Haute-Saône
- Arrondissement: Lure
- Canton: Lure-2
- Area^{1}: 3.88 km^{2} (1.50 sq mi)
- Highest elevation: 323 m (1,060 ft)
- Lowest elevation: 277 m (909 ft)
- Population (2023): 63
  - Density: 16/km^{2} (42/sq mi)
- Time zone: UTC+01:00 (CET)
  - Summer (DST): UTC+02:00 (CEST)
- INSEE/Postal code: 70515 /70200
- ^{1} French Land Register data, which excludes lakes, ponds, glaciers > 1 km^{2} (0.386 sq mi or 247 acres) and river estuaries.

Le Val-de-Gouhenans is a commune in the Haute-Saône department in the region of Bourgogne-Franche-Comté in eastern France.

== See also ==
- Communes of the Haute-Saône department
