= Pierre Bouchet =

French physician

- Born: 6 January 1752; Lyon, France
- Died: 6 January 1794 (aged 42); Lyon, France
- Citizenship: France
- Known for: first in France to modify then use a knotted-string snare device to ligate and remove uterus and vagina polyps
- Children: Claude-Antoine Bouchet (fr)
- Scientific career
- Fields: Medicine, Surgery
- Institutions: Lyon Hôtel-Dieu
- Academic advisors: Pierre-Joseph Desault

Pierre Bouchet (6 January 1752 – 6 January 1794) was a French physician born in Lyon.

== Biography ==
He was trained in medicine in Paris as Pierre-Joseph Desault's pupil then came home in Lyon Hôtel-Dieu where he became Head Surgeon.

He was the first in France to modify then use a knotted-string snare device to ligate and remove uterus and vagina polyps.

He also practiced internal necrosis surgery and tibia drilling.

His son, Claude-Antoine Bouchet, was the first, in France, to ligate external iliac artery to cure groin aneurysm.

Pierre Bouchet was always kind and good-hearted, so that his fellow citizens held him in the highest regard and esteem. He suffered a stroke and died under arrest on 1794 physically and psychologically exhausted by the Revolutionary armies siege of Lyon after the Revolt of the city against the National Convention.
