= Magny-Jobert =

- Commune
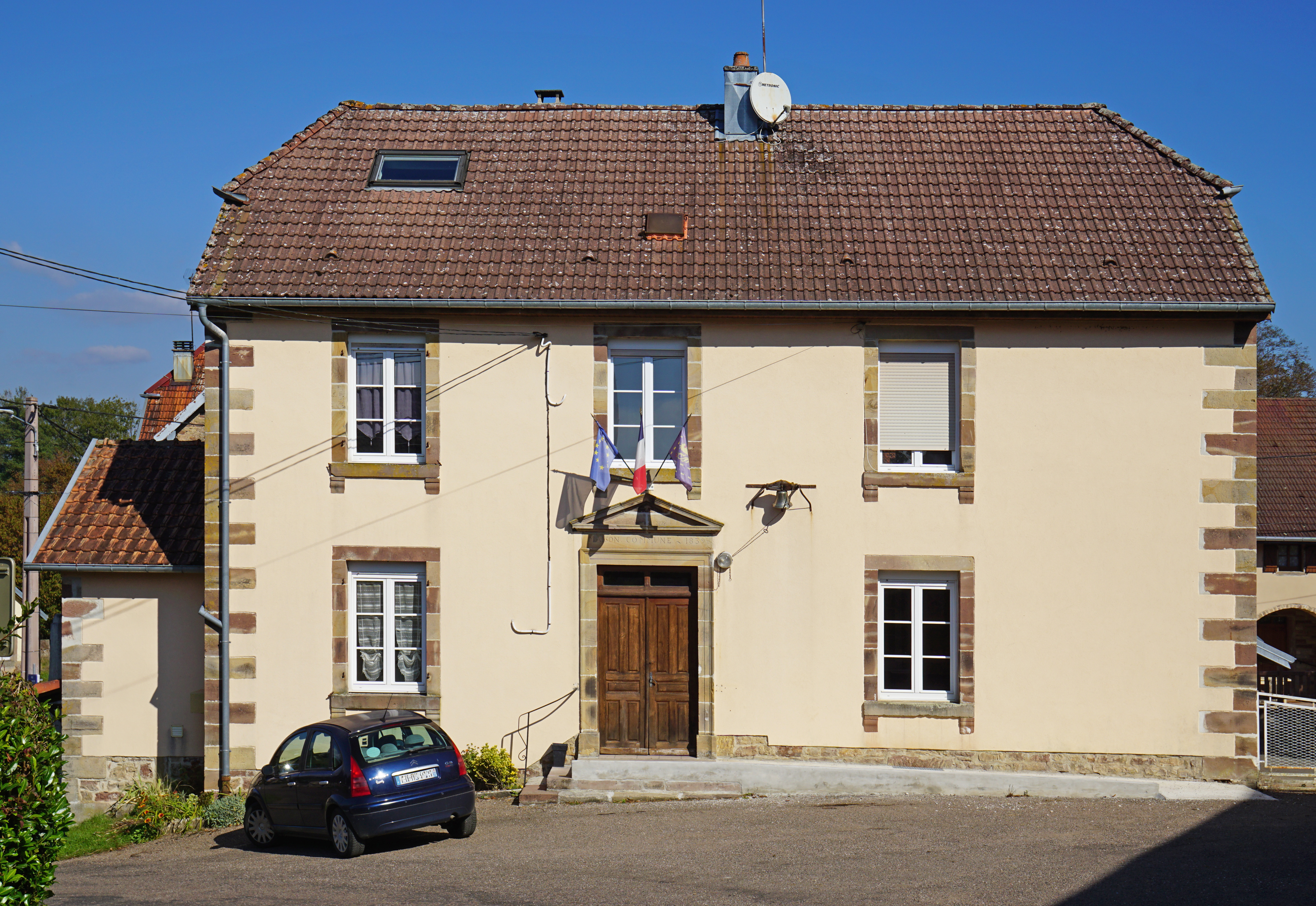
- The town hall in Magny-Jobert

- Coat of arms
- Location of Magny-Jobert
- Location within France Location within Bourgogne-Franche-Comté
- Coordinates: 47°38′52″N 6°35′33″E
- Country: France
- Region: Bourgogne-Franche-Comté
- Department: Haute-Saône
- Arrondissement: Lure
- Canton: Lure-2

Government
  - Mayor (2020–2026): Jean-Christophe Ballot
- Area^{1}: 3.68 km^{2} (1.42 sq mi)
- Highest elevation: 408 m (1,339 ft)
- Lowest elevation: 301 m (988 ft)
- Population (2023): 137
  - Density: 37.2/km^{2} (96.4/sq mi)
- Time zone: UTC+01:00 (CET)
  - Summer (DST): UTC+02:00 (CEST)
- INSEE/Postal code: 70319 /70200
- ^{1} French Land Register data, which excludes lakes, ponds, glaciers > 1 km^{2} (0.386 sq mi or 247 acres) and river estuaries.

Magny-Jobert (French pronunciation: [maɲi ʒɔbɛʁ]) is a commune in the Haute-Saône department in the region of Bourgogne-Franche-Comté in eastern France, counting 110 inhabitants as of 2017.

== See also ==
- Communes of the Haute-Saône department
