= Magny-Danigon =

- Commune
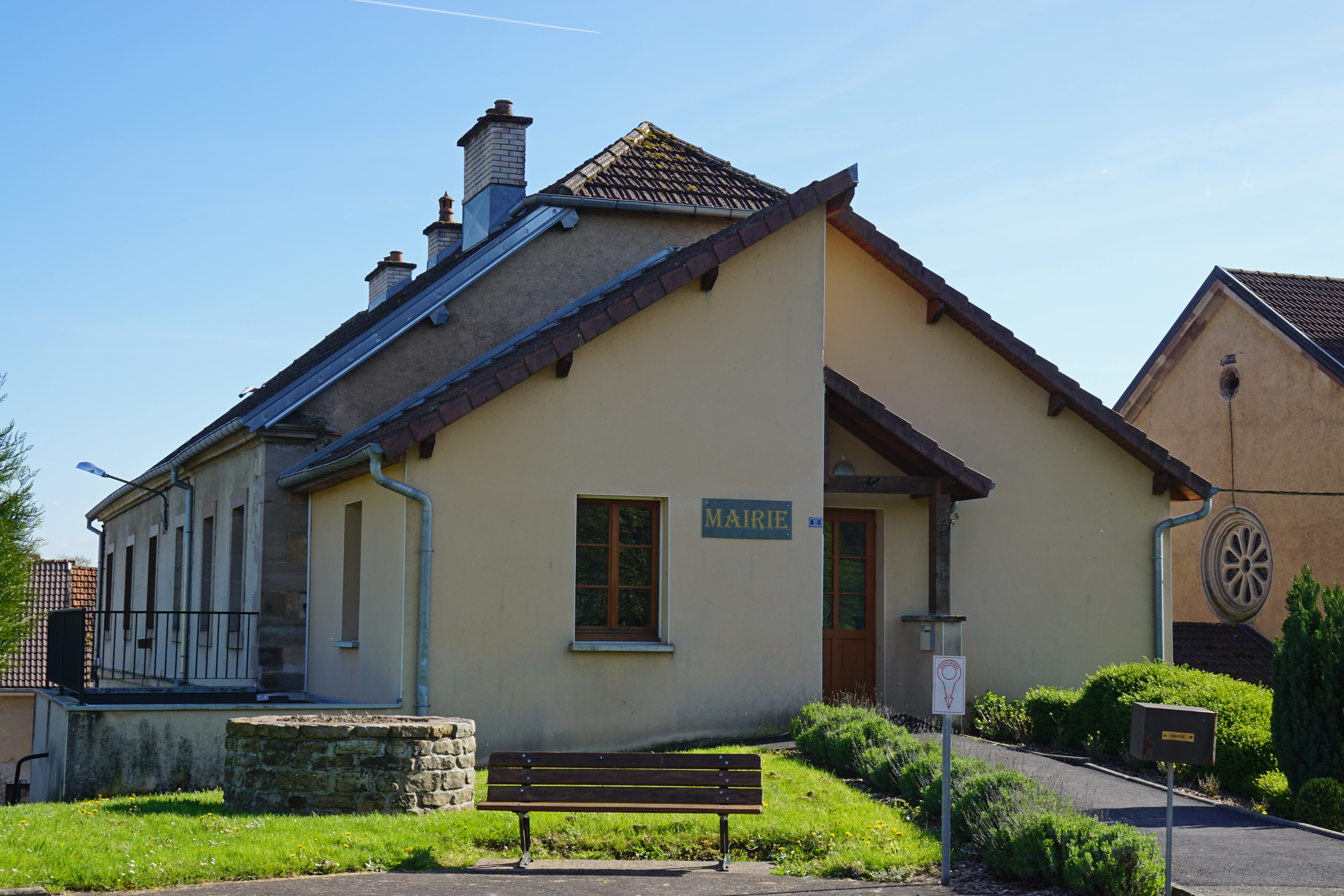
- The town hall in Magny-Danigon

- Coat of arms
- Location of Magny-Danigon
- Location within France Location within Bourgogne-Franche-Comté
- Coordinates: 47°40′32″N 6°36′12″E
- Country: France
- Region: Bourgogne-Franche-Comté
- Department: Haute-Saône
- Arrondissement: Lure
- Canton: Lure-2

Government
  - Mayor (2024–2026): Gaël Croissant
- Area^{1}: 7.52 km^{2} (2.90 sq mi)
- Highest elevation: 463 m (1,519 ft)
- Lowest elevation: 302 m (991 ft)
- Population (2023): 450
  - Density: 60/km^{2} (150/sq mi)
- Time zone: UTC+01:00 (CET)
  - Summer (DST): UTC+02:00 (CEST)
- INSEE/Postal code: 70318 /70200
- ^{1} French Land Register data, which excludes lakes, ponds, glaciers > 1 km^{2} (0.386 sq mi or 247 acres) and river estuaries.

Magny-Danigon (French pronunciation: [maɲi daniɡɔ̃]) is a commune in the Haute-Saône department in the region of Bourgogne-Franche-Comté in eastern France.

== See also ==
- Communes of the Haute-Saône department
- Arthur de Buyer Coal Mine is based in the commune.
