= Vouhenans =

- Commune
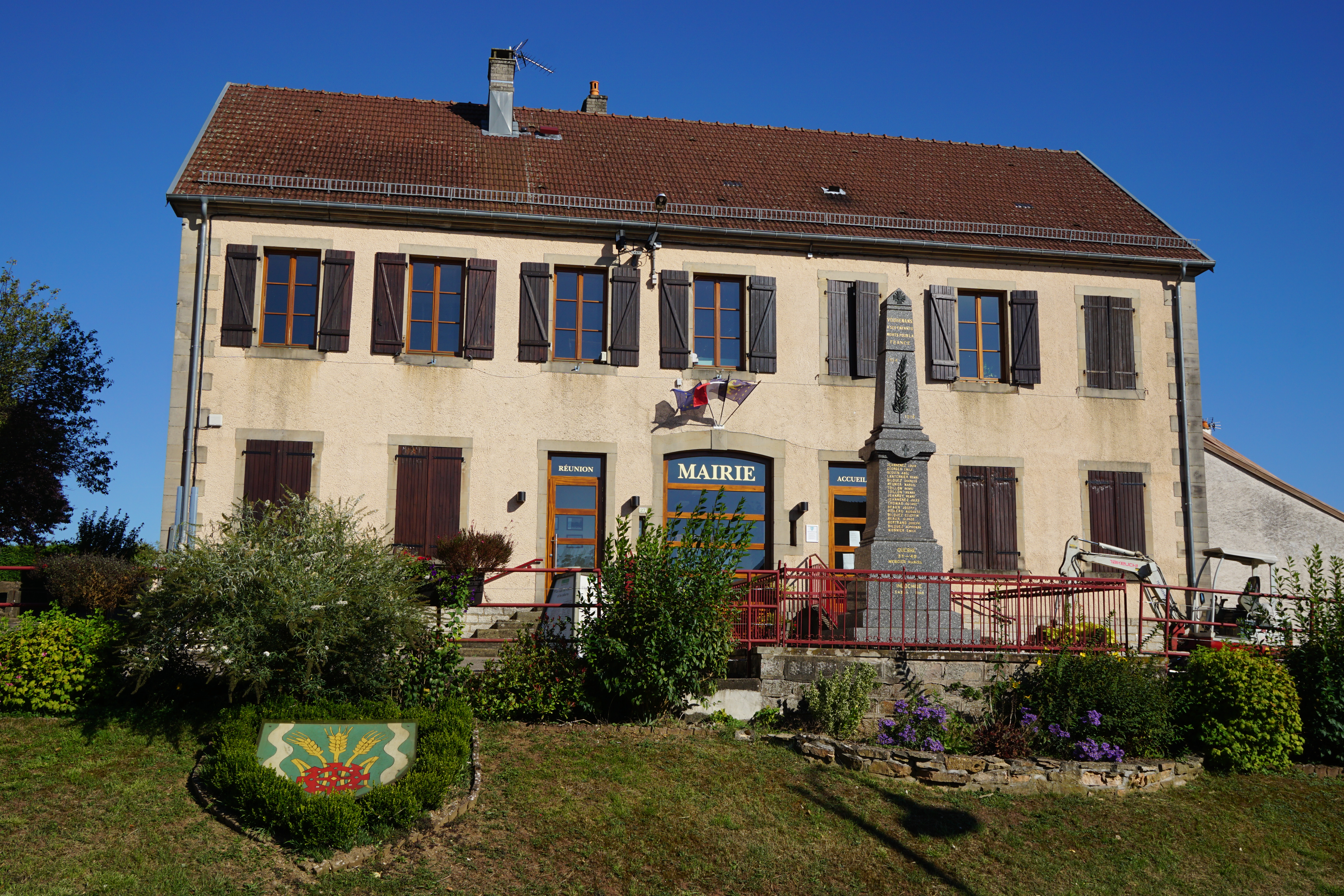
- The town hall in Vouhenans

- Coat of arms
- Location of Vouhenans
- Location within France Location within Bourgogne-Franche-Comté
- Coordinates: 47°39′05″N 6°28′55″E
- Country: France
- Region: Bourgogne-Franche-Comté
- Department: Haute-Saône
- Arrondissement: Lure
- Canton: Lure-2
- Intercommunality: Pays de Lure

Government
  - Mayor (2024–2026): Martine Marie-Pierre Meunier
- Area^{1}: 8.36 km^{2} (3.23 sq mi)
- Highest elevation: 333 m (1,093 ft)
- Lowest elevation: 277 m (909 ft)
- Population (2023): 379
  - Density: 45.3/km^{2} (117/sq mi)
- Time zone: UTC+01:00 (CET)
  - Summer (DST): UTC+02:00 (CEST)
- INSEE/Postal code: 70577 /70200
- ^{1} French Land Register data, which excludes lakes, ponds, glaciers > 1 km^{2} (0.386 sq mi or 247 acres) and river estuaries.

Vouhenans is a commune in the Haute-Saône department in the region of Bourgogne-Franche-Comté in eastern France.

== See also ==
- Communes of the Haute-Saône department
