= Andornay =

- Commune
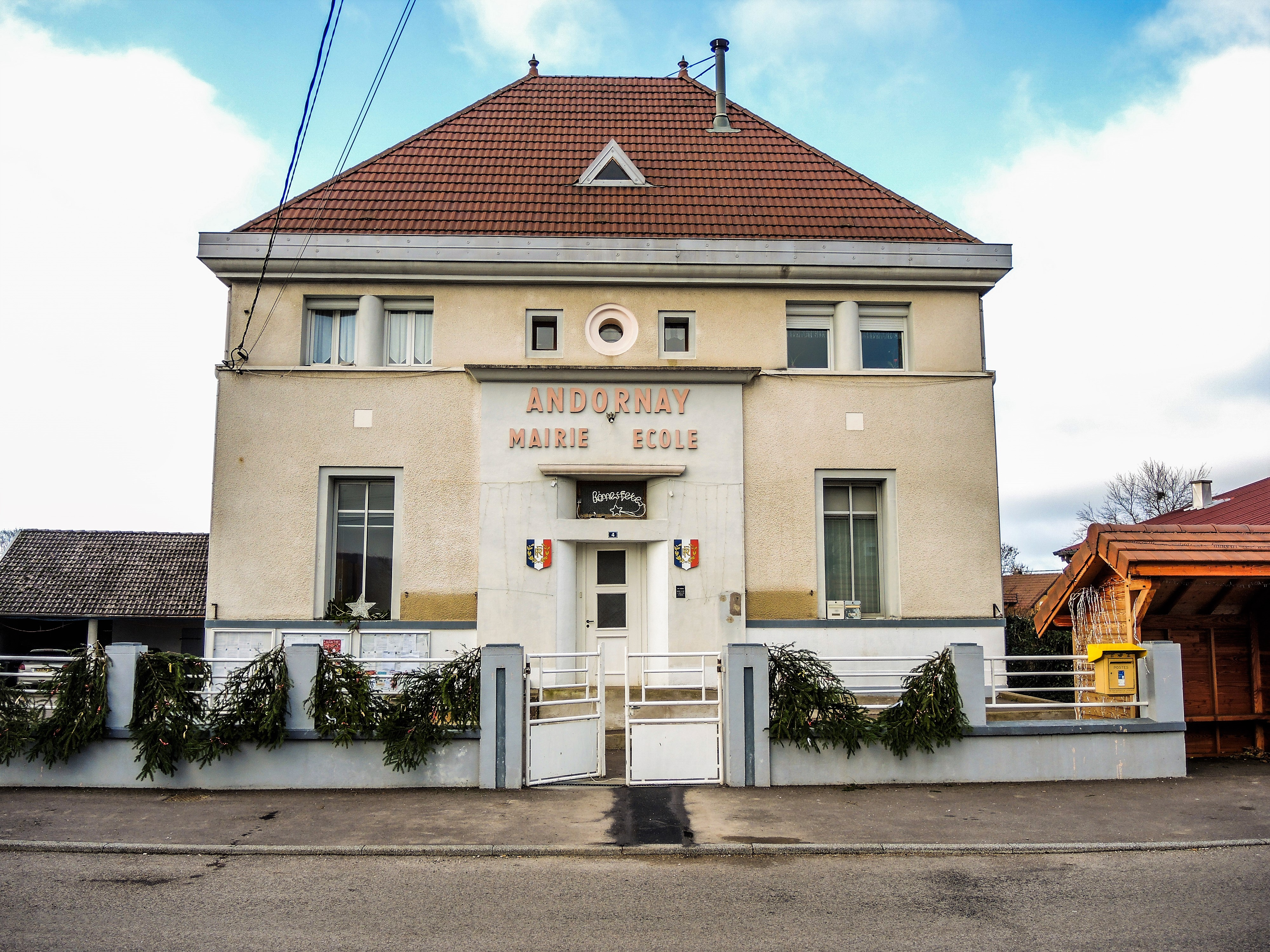
- The town hall in Andornay

- Coat of arms
- Location of Andornay
- Location within France Location within Bourgogne-Franche-Comté
- Coordinates: 47°39′23″N 6°35′51″E
- Country: France
- Region: Bourgogne-Franche-Comté
- Department: Haute-Saône
- Arrondissement: Lure
- Canton: Lure-2
- Intercommunality: Pays de Lure

Government
  - Mayor (2020–2026): Denis Ledoux
- Area^{1}: 1.48 km^{2} (0.57 sq mi)
- Highest elevation: 329 m (1,079 ft)
- Lowest elevation: 299 m (981 ft)
- Population (2023): 175
  - Density: 118/km^{2} (306/sq mi)
- Time zone: UTC+01:00 (CET)
  - Summer (DST): UTC+02:00 (CEST)
- INSEE/Postal code: 70021 /70200
- ^{1} French Land Register data, which excludes lakes, ponds, glaciers > 1 km^{2} (0.386 sq mi or 247 acres) and river estuaries.

Andornay (French pronunciation: [ɑ̃dɔʁnɛ]) is a commune in the Haute-Saône department in the region of Bourgogne-Franche-Comté in eastern France.

== Geography ==
Andornay is located in the north-east of the Bourgogne-Franche-Comté region, in the Haute-Saône département, not far from the Territoire de Belfort and the Doubs.

The small village of Andornay covers just 148 hectares, only one of which is forested.

== See also ==
- Communes of the Haute-Saône department
