= La Côte, Haute-Saône =

La Côte
- Commune
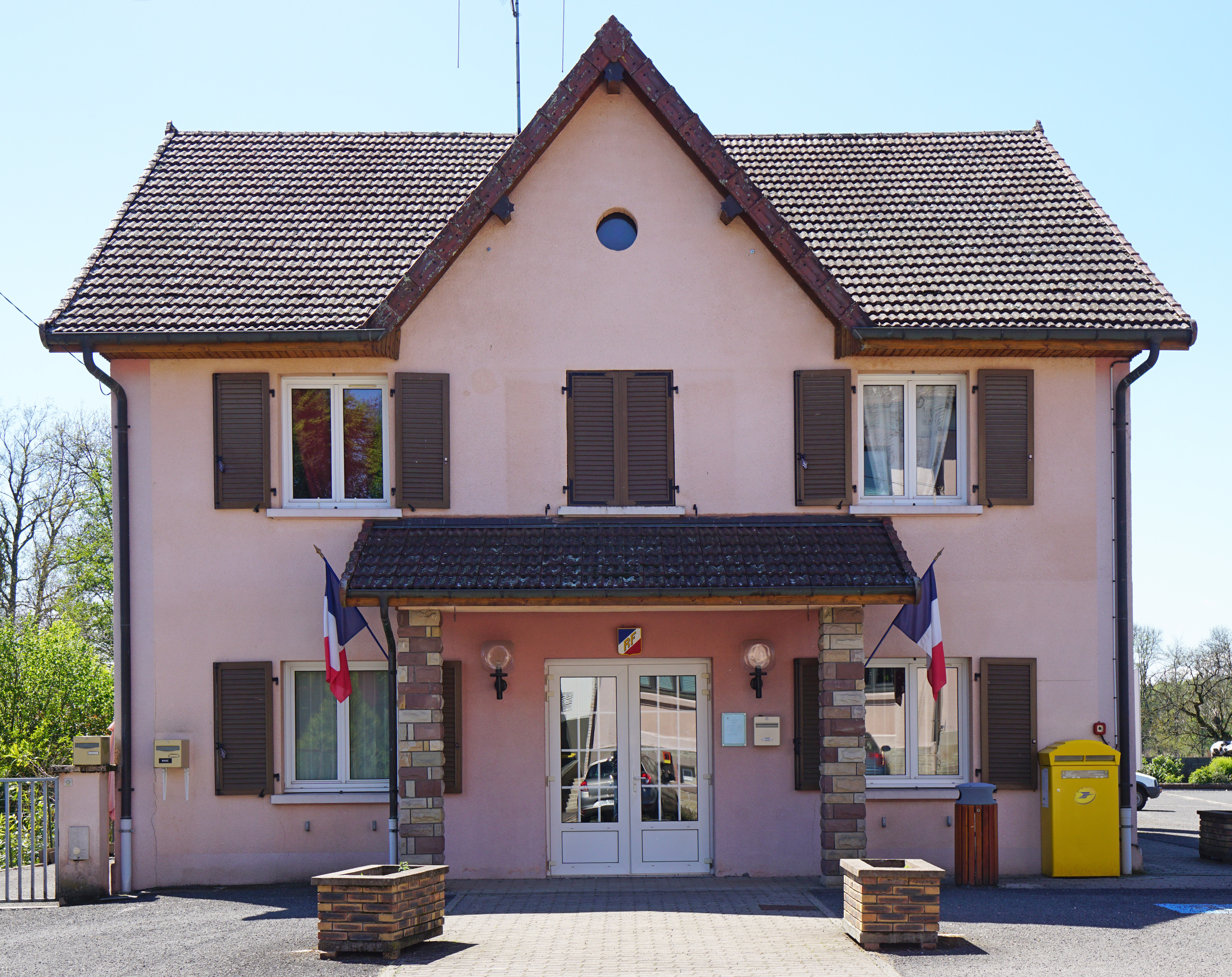
- The town hall in La Côte

- Coat of arms
- Location of La Côte
- Location within France Location within Bourgogne-Franche-Comté
- Coordinates: 47°41′16″N 6°34′22″E
- Country: France
- Region: Bourgogne-Franche-Comté
- Department: Haute-Saône
- Arrondissement: Lure
- Canton: Lure-2

Government
  - Mayor (2020–2026): Robert Vuillemard
- Area^{1}: 6.93 km^{2} (2.68 sq mi)
- Highest elevation: 362 m (1,188 ft)
- Lowest elevation: 307 m (1,007 ft)
- Population (2023): 549
  - Density: 79.2/km^{2} (205/sq mi)
- Time zone: UTC+01:00 (CET)
  - Summer (DST): UTC+02:00 (CEST)
- INSEE/Postal code: 70178 /70200
- ^{1} French Land Register data, which excludes lakes, ponds, glaciers > 1 km^{2} (0.386 sq mi or 247 acres) and river estuaries.

La Côte (French pronunciation: [la kot]) is a commune in the Haute-Saône department in the region of Bourgogne-Franche-Comté in eastern France.

== See also ==
- Communes of the Haute-Saône department
