= Communauté de communes Rahin et Chérimont =

Federation of municipalities in France

Rahin et Chérimont
- Communauté de communes
- Country: France
- Region: Bourgogne-Franche-Comté
- Department: Haute-Saône
- No. of communes: {{{nbcomm}}}
- Area: 152.8 km^{2} (59.0 sq mi)
- Population (2021): 11,703
  - Density: 76.59/km^{2} (198.4/sq mi)
- Website: https://www.ccrc70.fr

The Communauté de Communes Rahin et Chérimont (CCRC by its acronym in French) is a French communauté de communes created in December 2002 in the eastern part of the Haute-Saône department in France.

== History ==
The Communauté de communes was created by prefectoral decree on 20 December 2002.

In 2010, it moved its head office to the former home of the director of the Ronchamp spinning mill. The complete restoration of this factory between 2015 and 2017 to create a center for sport, culture, and crafts is the biggest project undertaken by the community, costing 5.6 million euros (52% subsidized).

On 1 January 2014, the previously isolated commune of Errevet joined the inter-communal grouping of 10 communes. The law on the new territorial organization of the Republic (loi NOTRe) of 7 August 2015, stipulates that public establishments for intercommunal cooperation (EPCI) with their tax status must have a minimum of 15,000 inhabitants unless most of the communes making it up are located in mountain areas, for which the threshold is lowered to 5,000 inhabitants. Rahin et Chérimont, of which only 3 communes, with a combined population of 5,942, are classified as “mountain areas”, is not affected by this derogation, and is therefore destined to merge with other intercommunal structures.

In October 2015, however, the Prefect of Haute-Saône presented a draft revision of the departmental intercommunal cooperation scheme (schéma départemental de coopération intercommunale, SDCI by its acronym in French), proposing that Belverne and Échavanne leave Rahin et Chérimont to join the Communauté de Communes du Pays d'Héricourt, and Clairegoutte and Frédéric-Fontaine to join the Communauté de Communes du Pays de Lure, thereby enabling the communauté de communes to benefit from the threshold for intercommunalities located in mountain zones.

The final SDCI, approved by the Prefect on 30 March 2016, confirms, subject to the effective classification of Champagney and Clairegoutte in mountain zones, the departure of:

- Clairegoutte and Frédéric-Fontaine, to join the Communauté de Communes du Pays de Lure;
- Échavanne, to join the Communauté de Communes du Pays d'Héricourt;

Rahin et Chérimont, whose territory has been reduced to Champagney, Échavanne, Errevet, Frahier-et-Chatebier, Frédéric-Fontaine, Plancher-Bas, Plancher-les-Mines and Ronchamp.

Champagney and Clairegoutte were classified as a “mountain commune” in July 2016.

On 1 January 2017, Belverne joined the Communauté de communes du Pays d'Héricourt.

The Massif Vosgien site, registered under the law of 2 May 1930, includes 14 Schéma de cohérence territoriale (SCOT) that have all or part of their territory within the perimeter of the Massif des Vosges.

== Toponymy ==
The name of this community evokes the two main geographical features that make it up: the Rahin valley to the north and the Chérimont massif to the south.

== Community territory ==
=== Geography ===
The various communes making up this community are located in and around the Rahin valley. This valley is located in the eastern part of the Haute-Saône department in the French region of Bourgogne-Franche-Comté.

==== Topography and landscape ====
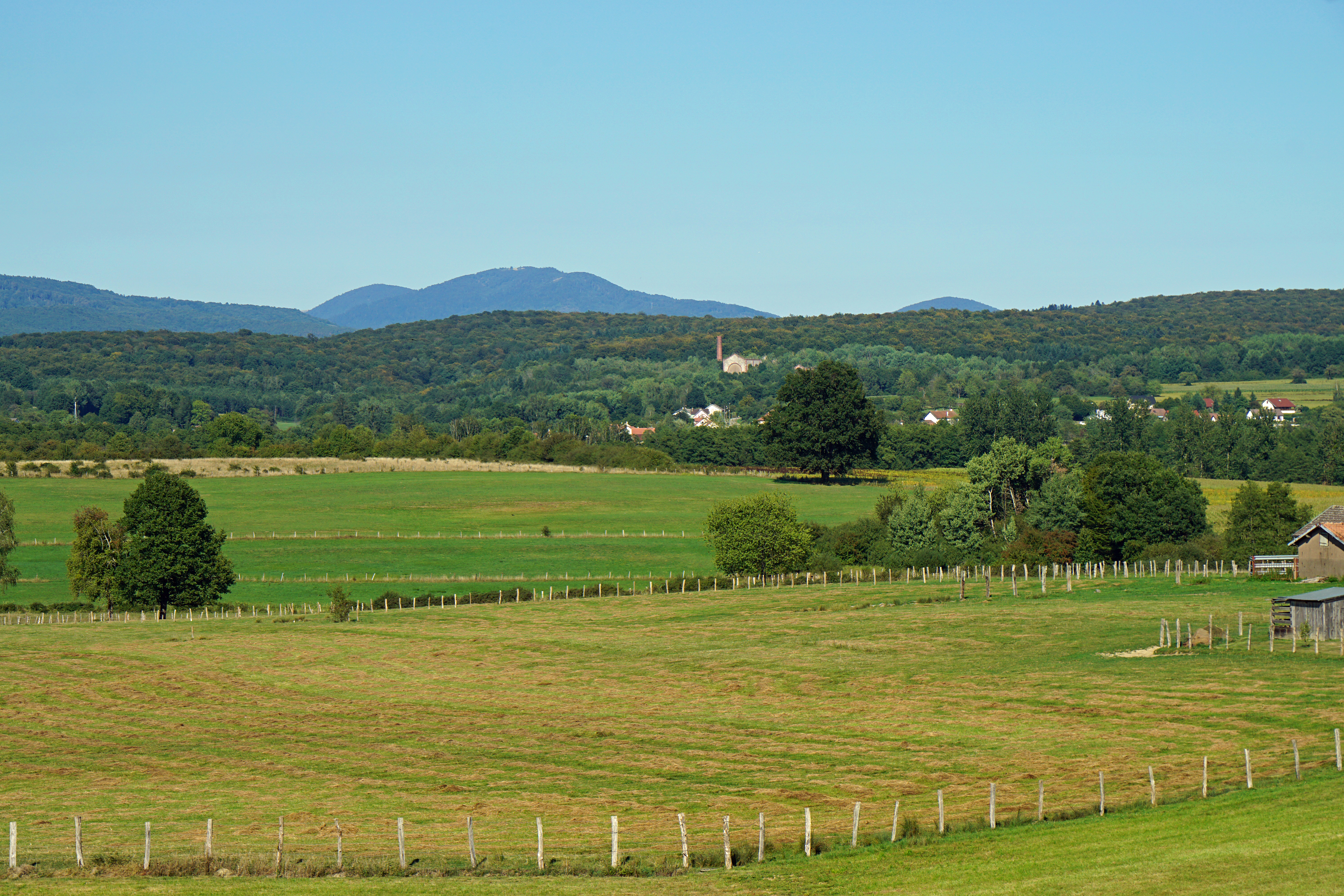
The Chérimont massif in green, beneath the blue line of the Vosges saônoises.

The area lies in a valley between the Chérimont and the southern Vosges mountains, which form a series of wooded hills and mountains. The main peaks in the landscape are Planche des Belles Filles (1,148 m), ballon Saint-Antoine (1,128 m), Roc du Plainet (807 m) and colline de Bourlémont (474 m) to the north, and Blanche Pierre (or Balcon d'Éboulet, 464 m) to the south.

==== Hydrology ====
The valley is crossed by the Rahin, which rises not far from the Col du Stalon, between the Ballon de Servance and the Ballon d'Alsace. There are also two smaller streams: the Rhien and the Beuveroux. The Haute-Saône canal is an unfinished construction.

==== Leisure, heritage, and tourism ====
- Hiking;
- Planche des Belles Filles (winter sports, cycling);
- Water sports: Champagney basin and ballastières;
- Museums: Maison de la Négritude and Musée de la Mine Marcel-Maulini;
- Main monuments: Notre-Dame-du-Haut chapel (UNESCO World Heritage site) and the Sainte-Marie shaft headframe.

==== Transportation ====
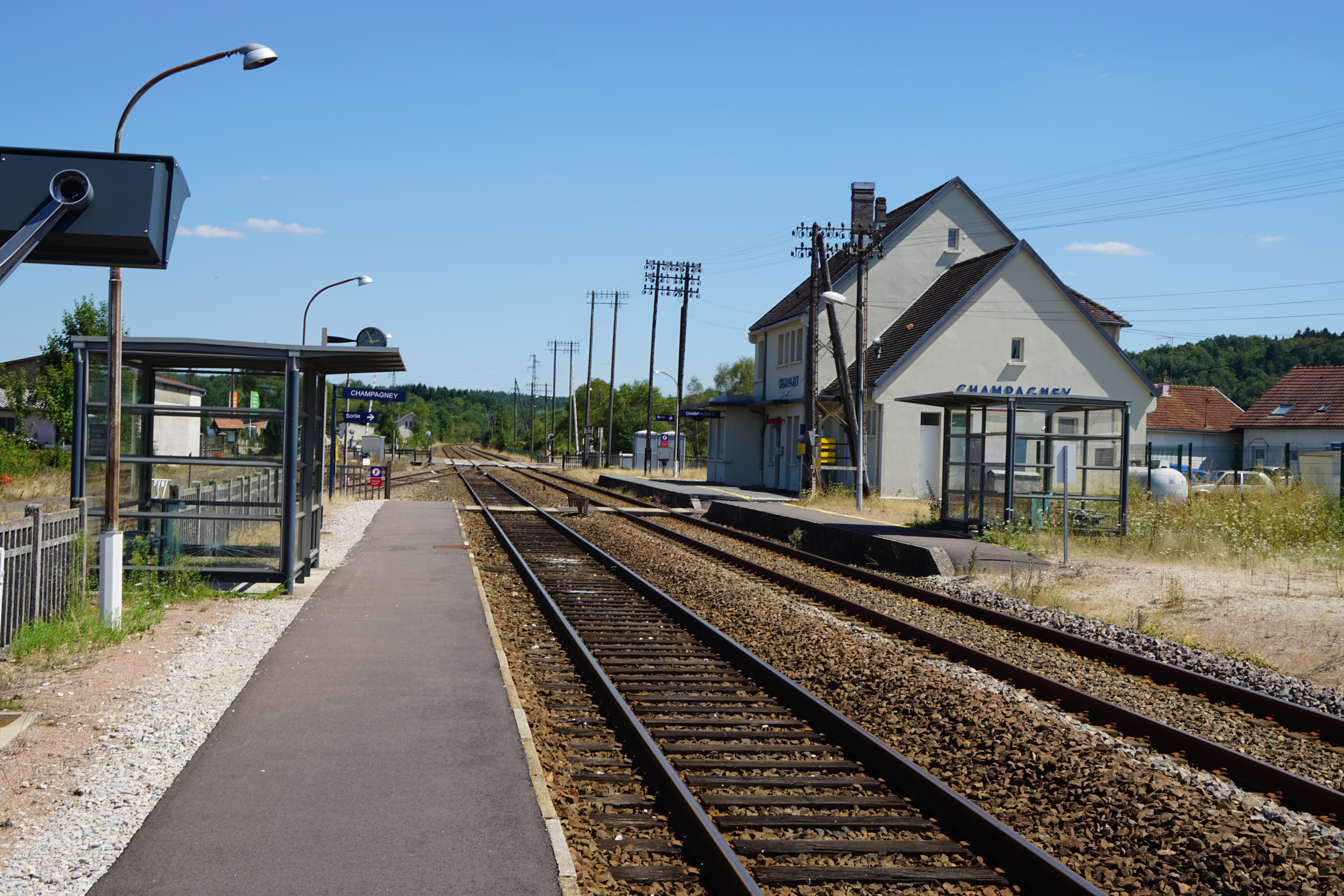
Champagney station in 2015.

The main form of public transport is by bus, with Saônoises lines 10, 12, and 15 serving the community. The Ronchamp and Champagney stations on the Paris-Est to Mulhouse-Ville line are served by the TER Franche-Comté network, which runs services between the Vesoul and Belfort or Montbéliard stations.

=== Composition ===
The communauté de communes is made up of the following 9 communes:

List of intercommunal communes
Name	INSEE code	Demonym	Surface area (km^{2})	Population (2024)	Density (per km^{2})	Ref.
Ronchamp (seat)	70451	Ronchampois	23.54	2,840	117	
Champagney	70120		36.71	3,891	101	
Clairegoutte	70157	Clairegouttois	10.48	361	33	
Échavanne	70205	Échavannais	3.21	203	62	
Errevet	70215	Errevetois	3.28	246	75	
Frahier-et-Chatebier	70248	Frahioulots	17.39	1,377	79	
Frédéric-Fontaine	70254		3.48	260	76	
Plancher-Bas	70413	Plancherots	29.12	1,963	64	
Plancher-les-Mines	70414	Mainous	25.59	991	37	

== Organization ==
=== Head office ===
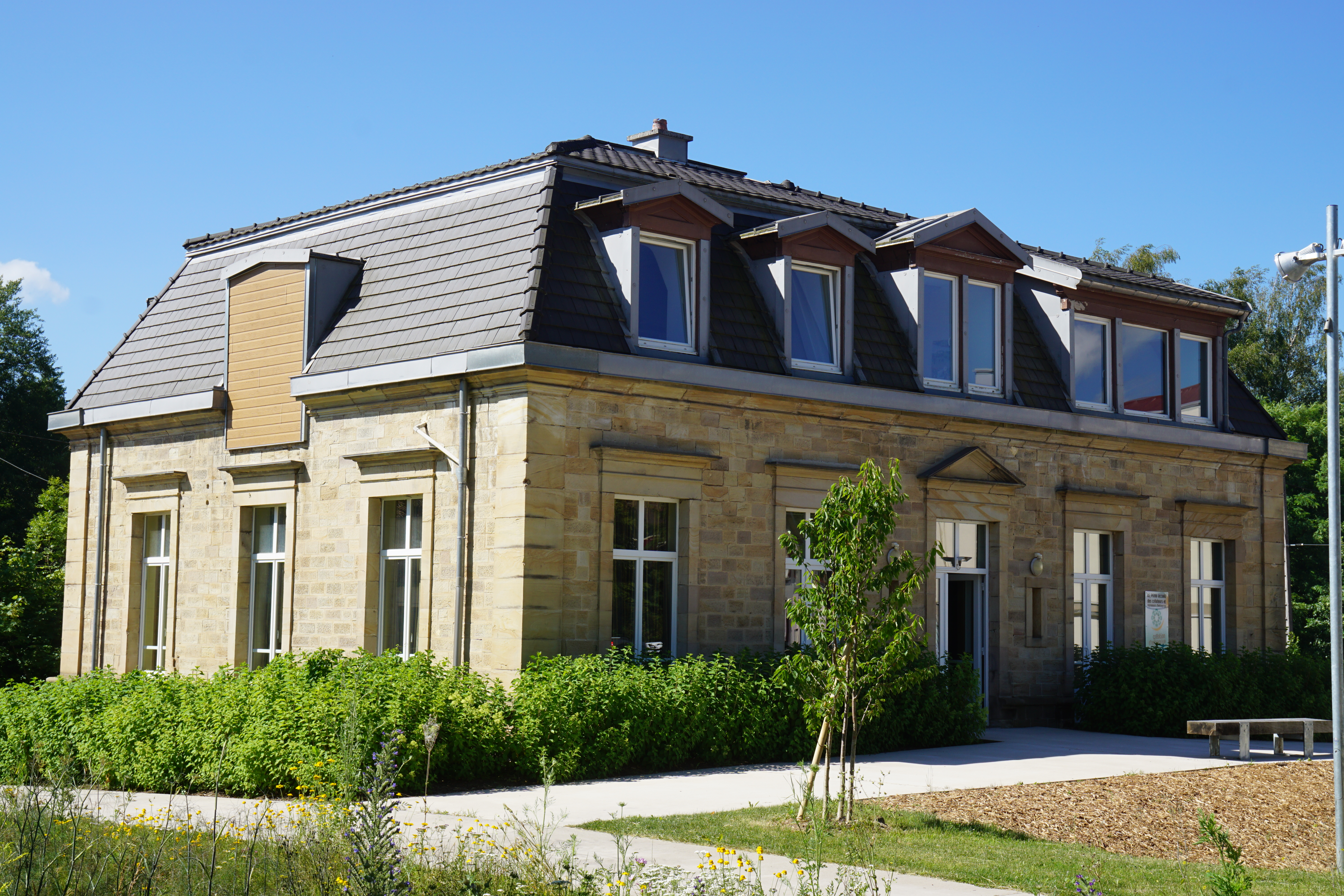
CCRC head office.

The head office is located in the Ronchamp spinning mill, 20 rue Paul Strauss.

=== Elected representatives ===
The Communauté de communes is administered by a Community Council made up, for the 2014–2020 term, of 31 delegates representing each of the 10 member communes, distributed roughly according to their population size, i.e.

- 8 delegates for Champagney;
- 7 delegates for Ronchamp;
- 4 delegates for Plancher-bas;
- 3 delegates for Frahier-et-Chatebier and Plancher-les-Mines;
- 2 delegates for Clairegoutte;
- 1 delegate for Échavanne, Errevet and Frédéric-Fontaine.

On April 17, 2014, the community council re-elected its president, René Grosjean, mayor of Frahier-et-Chatebier, as well as its 6 vice-presidents, who are:

1. Mireille Lab, elected member for Ronchamp, departmental councillor for Lure-1, in charge of personal services, youth, and cultural facilities and events;
2. Marie-Claire Faivre, mayor of Champagney, departmental councillor for Héricourt-1, in charge of the environment and sustainable development;
3. Didier Viltet, elected member for Plancher-Bas, in charge of communications, new technologies, geographic information systems, and broadband deployment;
4. Fabien Reuter, mayor of Echavanne, in charge of sports facilities and events, and trail management;
5. Michel Galmiche, mayor of Plancher-les-Mines, in charge of the economy and tourism;
6. Jean Marconot, mayor of Errevet, in charge of the local housing program (PLH), wood energy, SPANC, and Gens du voyage.

In June 2014, the community council modified the composition of the bureau, made up for the end of the 2014–2014 term of office of two additional vice-presidents:

1. Benoît Cornu, elected representative of Ronchamp, in charge of tourism;
2. Vincent Schiessel, mayor of Frédéric-Fontaine, responsible for housing and SPANC.

As well as a delegate community councillor: François Dupont (Belverne) and another member, Gilles Grosjean (Clairegoutte). They have alternates.

=== List of chairmen ===
In office		Name	Party	Capacity	Ref.
Missing data must be completed.
December 2002	June 2020	René Grosjean	Miscellaneous left, Socialist Party	Mayor of Frahier-et-Chatebier (2001–2020)	
June 2020	Incumbent	Benoît Cornu	Miscellaneous left	Teacher Mayor of Ronchamp (2020); County councillor for Lure-1 (2021)	

=== Competences ===
The intercommunal body exercises the competences transferred to it by the member communes, in accordance with the conditions laid down in the General Code of Territorial Authorities. These are:

==== Compulsory competences ====
- Spatial planning;
- Economic development.

==== Optional competences ====
- Housing policy;
- Roads;
- Environmental protection and enhancement;
- Cultural and sports facilities and pre-elementary and elementary education facilities;
- Social action;
- Tourism.

==== Voluntary competences ====
- Membership of the Pays des Vosges Saônoises;
- Maintenance and development of services and events for families and young people;
- Information and communication technologies;
- Support for member communes in the preparation of administrative and technical files;
- Heritage;
- Communication;
- Project space.

=== Tax system and budget ===
The Communauté de communes is an inter-communal public body with its own tax system.

To finance the exercise of its powers, the inter-municipality levies a single business tax (FPU) — the successor to the single business tax (TPU) — and equalizes resources between residential communes and those with business parks.

It also receives a subsidy from the global operating grant and collects the household waste collection fee (REOM), which finances the operation of this service.

== Projects and achievements ==
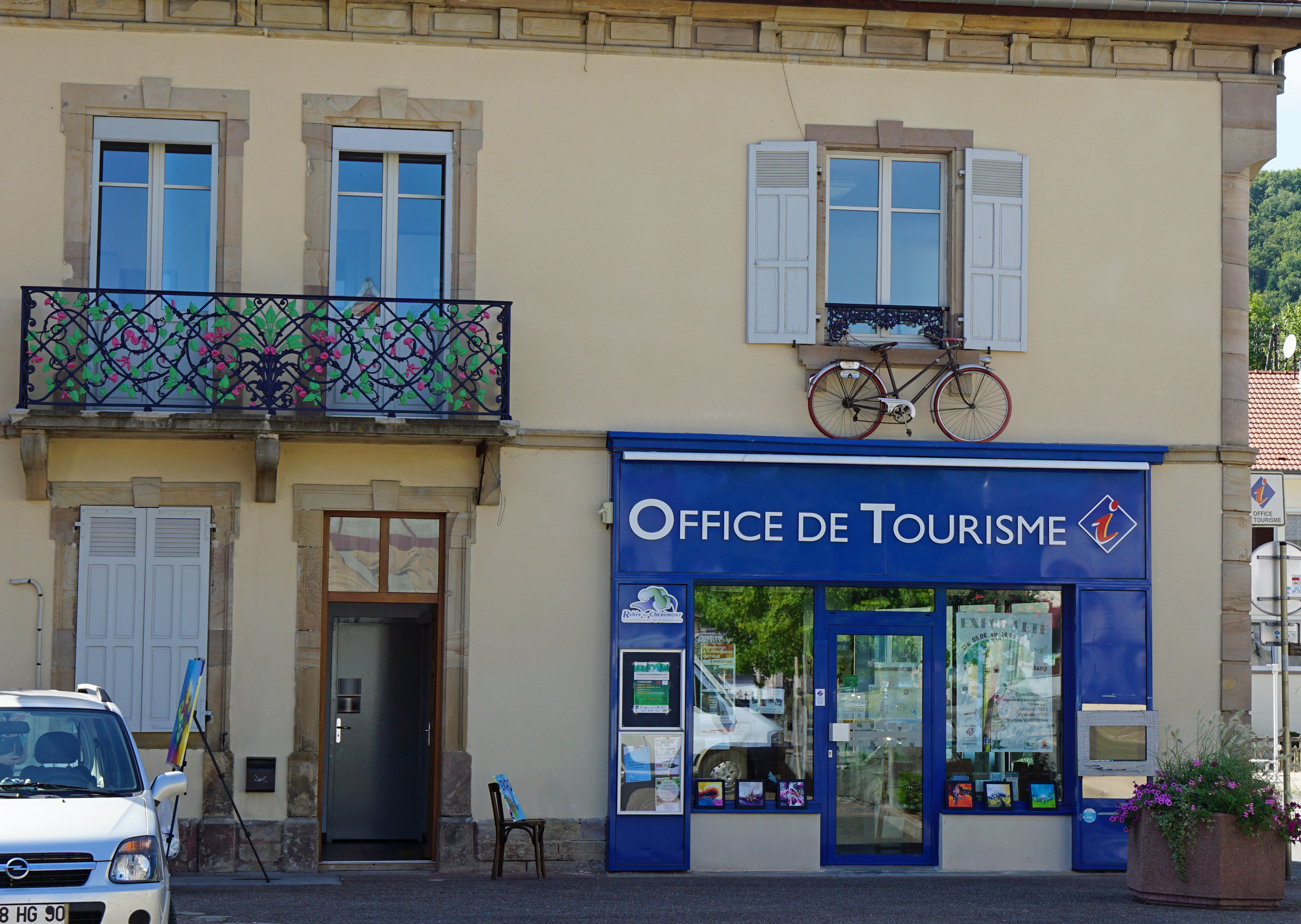
The tourist office.

The above-mentioned competencies enable the company to generate activities whose results are now clearly identified:

- Management of the household waste service through a fee based on household composition;
- Financial operation of the Point Emploi Formation intercommunal (intercommunal employment and training center) attached to the Mission Locale Lure-Luxeuil-les-Bains;
- Participation in and support for the Musicales de Clairegoutte and Rahin et Chérimont festival, since 2004;
- Organization of Côté Cour shows for schoolchildren, as well as transport for them;
- Management of digital public spaces (EPN) in Plancher-Bas, Champagney, and Ronchamp, offering workshops in office automation (beginners and advanced), digital photography and website creation;
- The creation of an inter-communal business park of the Pôle de Développement Economique type, with a view to maintaining industrial activities and developing overall employment;
- Support for the Ronchamp intercommunal tourist office and the implementation of tourism projects such as the fiftieth anniversary of the Notre-Dame-du-Haut chapel in 2005;
- Setting up the Discovery Passport for a joint offer from the tourist sites of the Chapelle Notre-Dame-du-Haut in Ronchamp, the Marcel-Maulini Mine Museum in Ronchamp, and the Maison de la Négritude et des Droits de l'Homme in Champagney;
- Involvement in a visit by a class of students from the Lycée Agricole de Valdoie on the theme of landscape;
- Logistical participation in the organization of international youth work camps for the restoration of the Clairegoutte cemetery.

== See also ==
- Communes of the Haute-Saône department
- Communauté de communes du Pays de Lure
