= Luze =

Luze may refer to:

- Luže (Chrudim District), a town of the Czech Republic
- Luzé, a commune in the French region of Centre
- Luze, Haute-Saône, a commune in the French region of Franche-comté
- Luže, Šenčur, a village in the Municipality of Šenčur, Slovenia
