= Frédéric-Fontaine =

- Commune
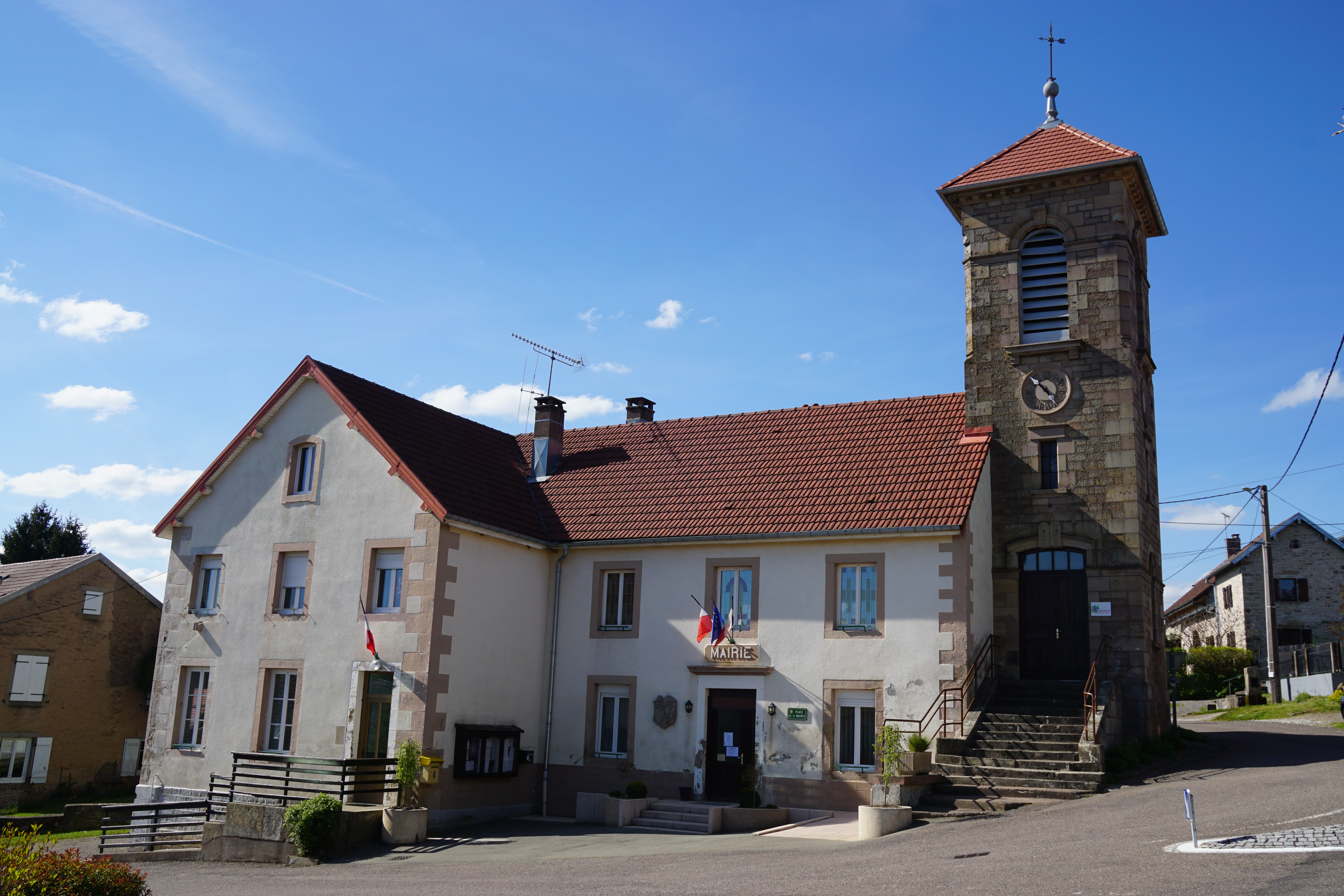
- The town hall and Protestant church in Frédéric-Fontaine

- Coat of arms
- Location of Frédéric-Fontaine
- Location within France Location within Bourgogne-Franche-Comté
- Coordinates: 47°39′27″N 6°37′49″E
- Country: France
- Region: Bourgogne-Franche-Comté
- Department: Haute-Saône
- Arrondissement: Lure
- Canton: Héricourt-1
- Intercommunality: Rahin et Chérimont

Government
  - Mayor (2020–2026): Vincent Schiessel
- Area^{1}: 3.48 km^{2} (1.34 sq mi)
- Highest elevation: 498 m (1,634 ft)
- Lowest elevation: 334 m (1,096 ft)
- Population (2023): 278
  - Density: 79.9/km^{2} (207/sq mi)
- Time zone: UTC+01:00 (CET)
  - Summer (DST): UTC+02:00 (CEST)
- INSEE/Postal code: 70254 /70200
- ^{1} French Land Register data, which excludes lakes, ponds, glaciers > 1 km^{2} (0.386 sq mi or 247 acres) and river estuaries.

Frédéric-Fontaine (French pronunciation: [fʁedeʁik fɔ̃tɛn]) is a commune in the Haute-Saône department in the region of Bourgogne-Franche-Comté in eastern France.

Frédéric-Fontaine near Etobon, was established in 1603 by the Duke Frederick of Wurtemberg as a haven for persecuted Swiss Protestants and others from France. He found a cool spring here on a hunting trip in 1586, hence the “fountain.” Fourteen founding families settled here in the early 17th century. Continued pressure on religious freedom, European conflicts (such as the War of the Austrian Succession) and lack of economic opportunity led some families from Frédéric-Fontaine to emigrate, mainly to North America. Many of these families, alongside others in the region and also from the Palatinate, boarded ships in the 1750s for Nova Scotia as part of the British scheme to settle newly acquired colony with Foreign Protestants to supplant the local French Catholic population.

== See also ==
- Communes of the Haute-Saône department
