= Ballon de Servance =

Peak in the Vosges Mountains

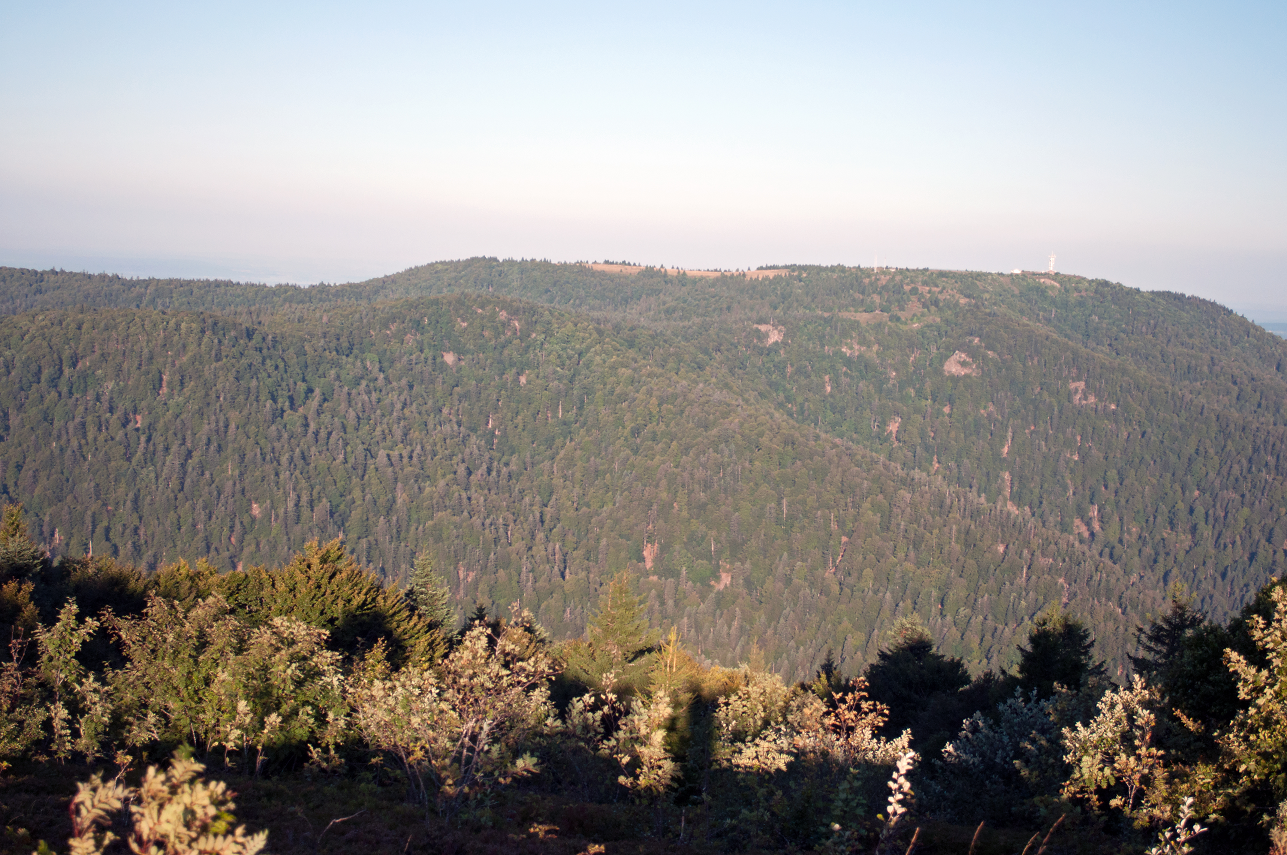
- The Ballon de Servance seen from the Ballon d'Alsace.

Highest point
- Elevation: 1,216 m (3,990 ft)
- Coordinates: 46°49′48″N 6°47′34″E

Geography
- Location within France
- Location: Lorraine, Franche-Comté, France
- Parent range: Vosges Mountains

The Ballon de Servance is a summit in the Southern Vosges Mountains, located on the border of Bourgogne-Franche-Comté and the Grand Est region. It is the highest point in the Haute-Saône department and within the Comtois Balloons National Nature Reserve. It marks the first significant peak with an altitude exceeding 1,000 meters when approaching the Vosges Mountains from the southwest. Its neighbor, the Ballon d'Alsace, only surpasses it by 31 meters.

== Geography ==
The summit area is occupied by a small pasture, one of the smallest in the massif, dominated by restricted military installations and a pasture for cattle during the summer. The pasture is crossed by a hiking trail that connects the Col du Ballon de Servance to the Sailley refuge and the Col du Luthier.

The Ballon de Servance rises to an altitude of 1,216 meters, straddling the border of two departments: Haute-Saône, where it stands as the highest point, and Vosges. It is situated between the Ballon d'Alsace to the east (separated by the Stalon Pass), the Château-Lambert massif to the west, the Rahin Valley and the Planche des Belles Filles massif to the south, and the Upper Moselle Valley to the north.

Climate data for Ballon De Servance, 1213m (1991–2020 normals)
Month	Jan	Feb	Mar	Apr	May	Jun	Jul	Aug	Sep	Oct	Nov	Dec	Year
Record high °C (°F)	13.4 (56.1)	16.2 (61.2)	18.0 (64.4)	22.0 (71.6)	25.4 (77.7)	30.6 (87.1)	31.2 (88.2)	30.8 (87.4)	25.8 (78.4)	22.2 (72.0)	18.1 (64.6)	14.6 (58.3)	31.2 (88.2)
Mean daily maximum °C (°F)	0.7 (33.3)	0.9 (33.6)	4.3 (39.7)	9.5 (49.1)	12.4 (54.3)	16.3 (61.3)	18.5 (65.3)	17.5 (63.5)	14.4 (57.9)	10.3 (50.5)	5.2 (41.4)	1.9 (35.4)	9.3 (48.8)
Daily mean °C (°F)	−1.4 (29.5)	−1.3 (29.7)	1.6 (34.9)	6.2 (43.2)	9.0 (48.2)	12.8 (55.0)	14.9 (58.8)	14.1 (57.4)	11.2 (52.2)	7.6 (45.7)	3.0 (37.4)	−0.2 (31.6)	6.5 (43.6)
Mean daily minimum °C (°F)	−3.5 (25.7)	−3.5 (25.7)	−1.1 (30.0)	2.9 (37.2)	5.6 (42.1)	9.4 (48.9)	11.4 (52.5)	10.7 (51.3)	8.1 (46.6)	5.0 (41.0)	0.8 (33.4)	−2.4 (27.7)	3.6 (38.5)
Record low °C (°F)	−12.6 (9.3)	−18.3 (−0.9)	−12.8 (9.0)	−9.2 (15.4)	−4.1 (24.6)	−0.9 (30.4)	3.0 (37.4)	2.2 (36.0)	0.3 (32.5)	−7.2 (19.0)	−11.3 (11.7)	−20.1 (−4.2)	−20.1 (−4.2)
Average precipitation mm (inches)	190.7 (7.51)	141.0 (5.55)	160.4 (6.31)	94.1 (3.70)	171.1 (6.74)	137.1 (5.40)	146.4 (5.76)	148.7 (5.85)	138.5 (5.45)	161.6 (6.36)	171.8 (6.76)	221.5 (8.72)	1,882.9 (74.11)
Source: Météo-France

== Air disaster of 1963 ==
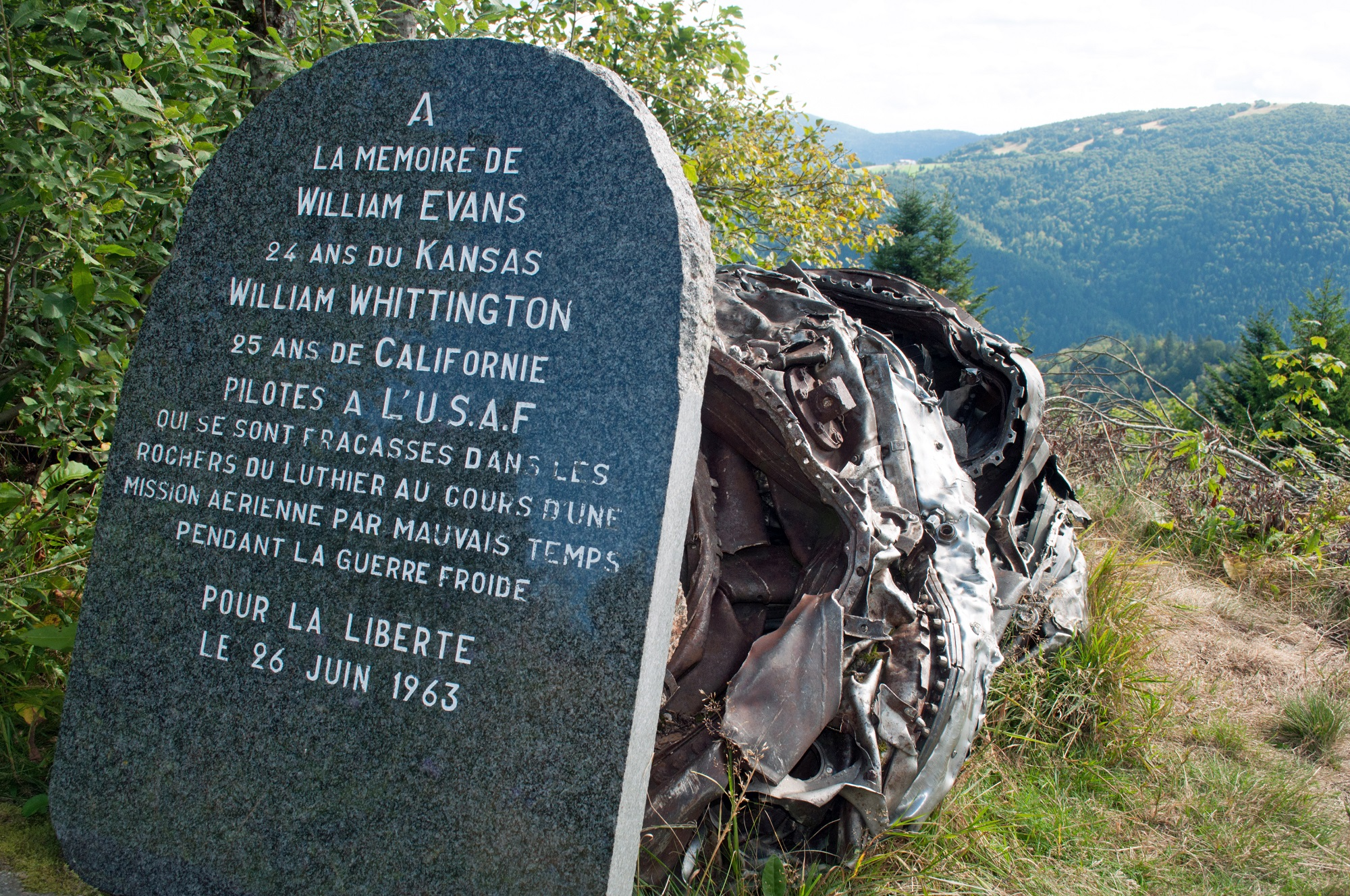
The memorial dedicated to the two pilots, resting on the remains of a jet engine.

On the morning of June 25, 1963, two American warplanes, F-100 Super Sabres, crashed simultaneously into the rocks of Luthier due to bad weather. The pilots were supposed to report their position at 10 a.m. but failed to do so. Both aircraft had taken off from Hahn Air Base in Germany and were en route to Mâcon.

Near the border between Vosges and Haute-Saône, close to the Sailley refuge located below the fort on the eastern slope of the summit, there is a memorial dedicated to the two pilots killed in this simultaneous double air disaster. Behind the memorial, the remains of a jet engine have been preserved. The memorial erroneously mentions the date of June 26, 1963, which is actually the date when the wreckage was discovered. The two pilots were named William Evans, 24, from Kansas, and William Whittington, 25, from California. The memorial serves as a reminder that during the Cold War era, they died for freedom.

== See also ==
- Vosges Mountains
