= Échenans-sous-Mont-Vaudois =

- Commune
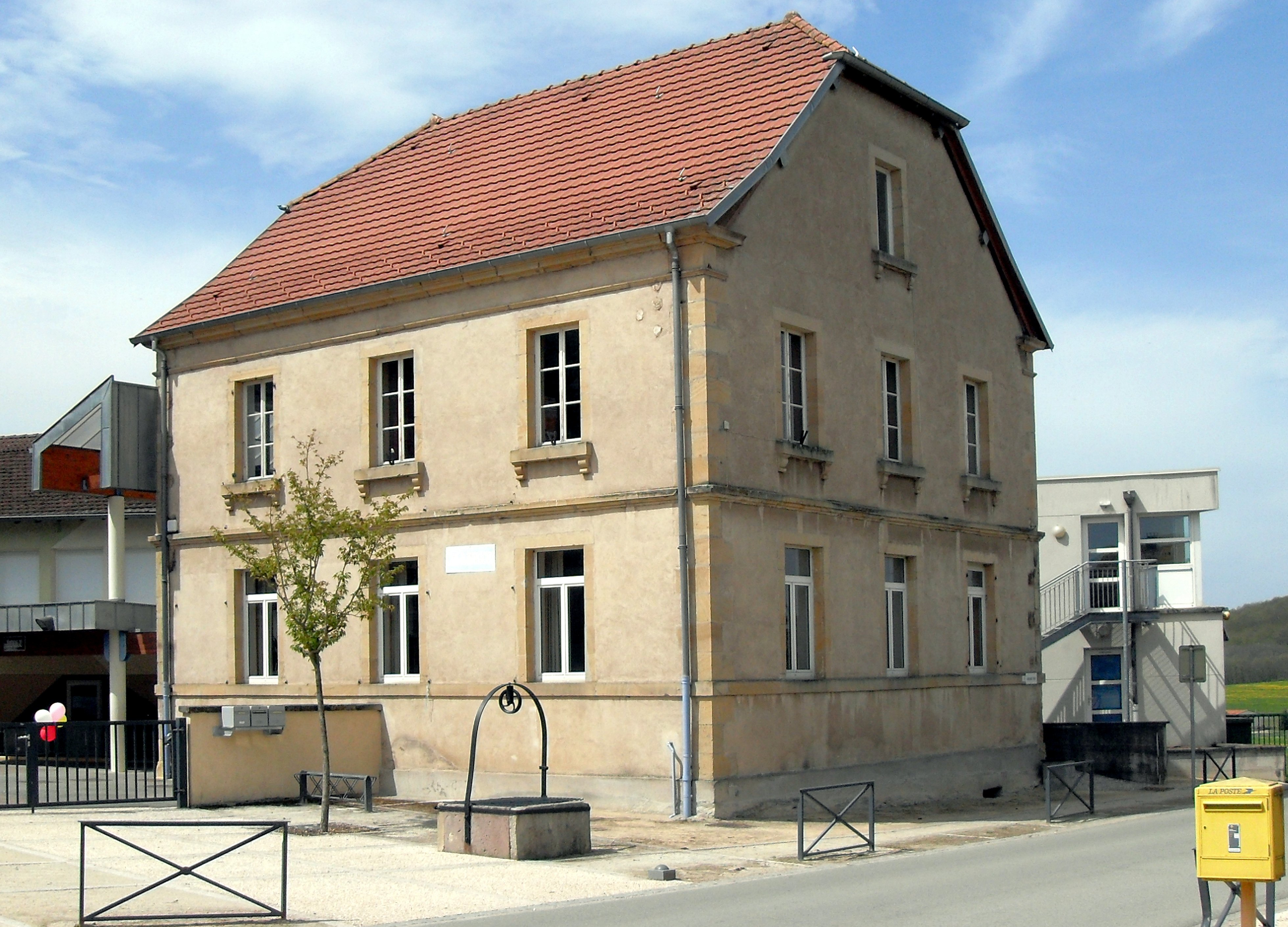
- The town hall in Échenans-sous-Mont-Vaudois

- Coat of arms
- Location of Échenans-sous-Mont-Vaudois
- Location within France Location within Bourgogne-Franche-Comté
- Coordinates: 47°36′11″N 6°46′21″E
- Country: France
- Region: Bourgogne-Franche-Comté
- Department: Haute-Saône
- Arrondissement: Lure
- Canton: Héricourt-1
- Intercommunality: CC pays d'Héricourt

Government
  - Mayor (2020–2026): Dominique Chaudey
- Area^{1}: 5.44 km^{2} (2.10 sq mi)
- Highest elevation: 530 m (1,740 ft)
- Lowest elevation: 344 m (1,129 ft)
- Population (2023): 567
  - Density: 104/km^{2} (270/sq mi)
- Time zone: UTC+01:00 (CET)
  - Summer (DST): UTC+02:00 (CEST)
- INSEE/Postal code: 70206 /70400
- ^{1} French Land Register data, which excludes lakes, ponds, glaciers > 1 km^{2} (0.386 sq mi or 247 acres) and river estuaries.

Échenans-sous-Mont-Vaudois (French pronunciation: [eʃnɑ̃ su mɔ̃ vodwa]) is a commune in the Haute-Saône department in the region of Bourgogne-Franche-Comté in eastern France.

== See also ==
- Communes of the Haute-Saône department
