= Plancher-Bas =

- Commune
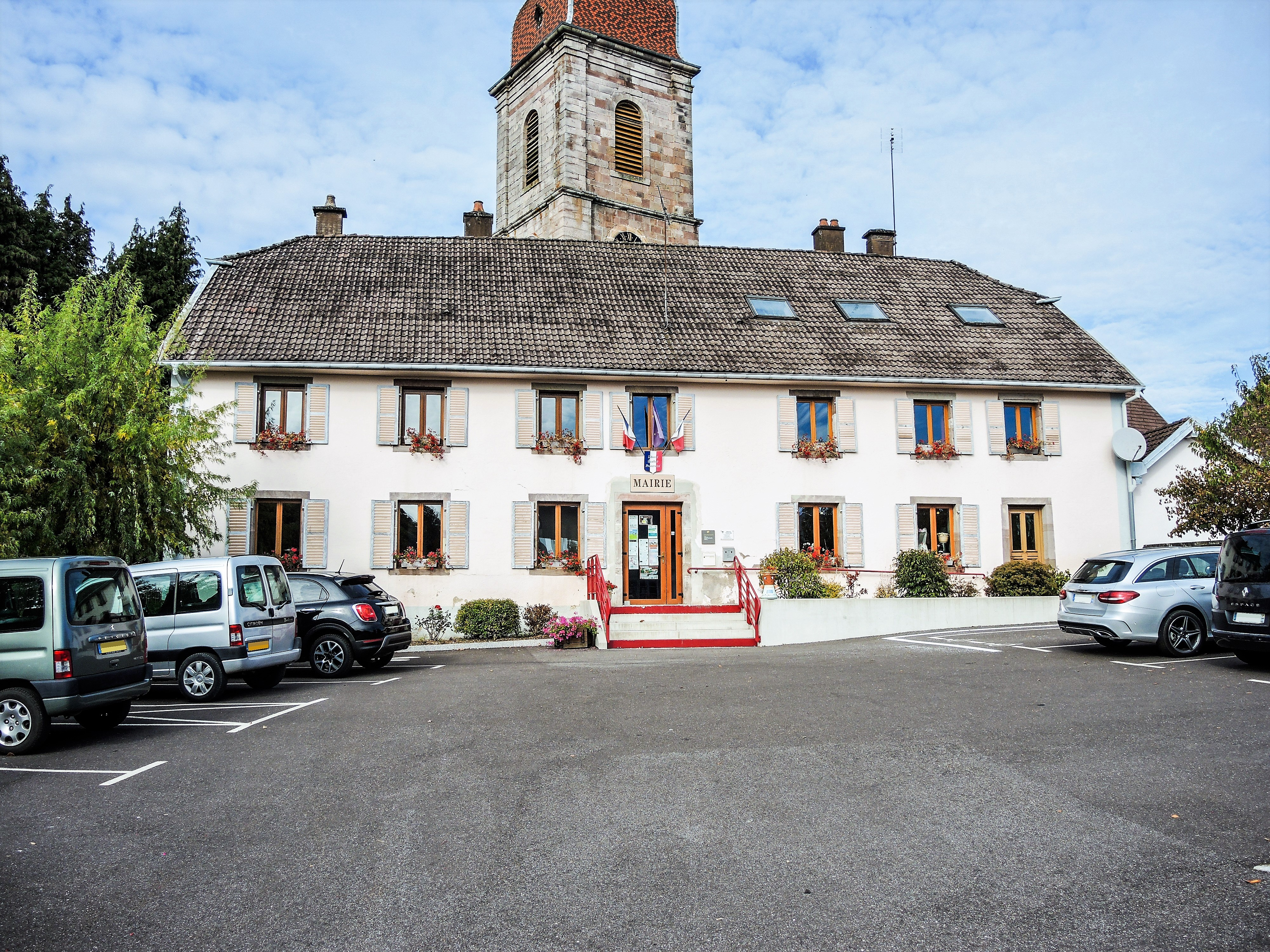
- The town hall in Plancher-Bas

- Coat of arms
- Location of Plancher-Bas
- Location within France Location within Bourgogne-Franche-Comté
- Coordinates: 47°43′19″N 6°44′01″E
- Country: France
- Region: Bourgogne-Franche-Comté
- Department: Haute-Saône
- Arrondissement: Lure
- Canton: Héricourt-1
- Intercommunality: Rahin et Chérimont

Government
  - Mayor (2024–2026): Eric Boilletot
- Area^{1}: 29.12 km^{2} (11.24 sq mi)
- Highest elevation: 850 m (2,790 ft)
- Lowest elevation: 366 m (1,201 ft)
- Population (2023): 1,846
  - Density: 63.39/km^{2} (164.2/sq mi)
- Time zone: UTC+01:00 (CET)
  - Summer (DST): UTC+02:00 (CEST)
- INSEE/Postal code: 70413 /70290
- ^{1} French Land Register data, which excludes lakes, ponds, glaciers > 1 km^{2} (0.386 sq mi or 247 acres) and river estuaries.

Plancher-Bas is a commune in the Haute-Saône department in the region of Bourgogne-Franche-Comté in eastern France.

== See also ==
- Communes of the Haute-Saône department
