= Brevilliers =

- Commune
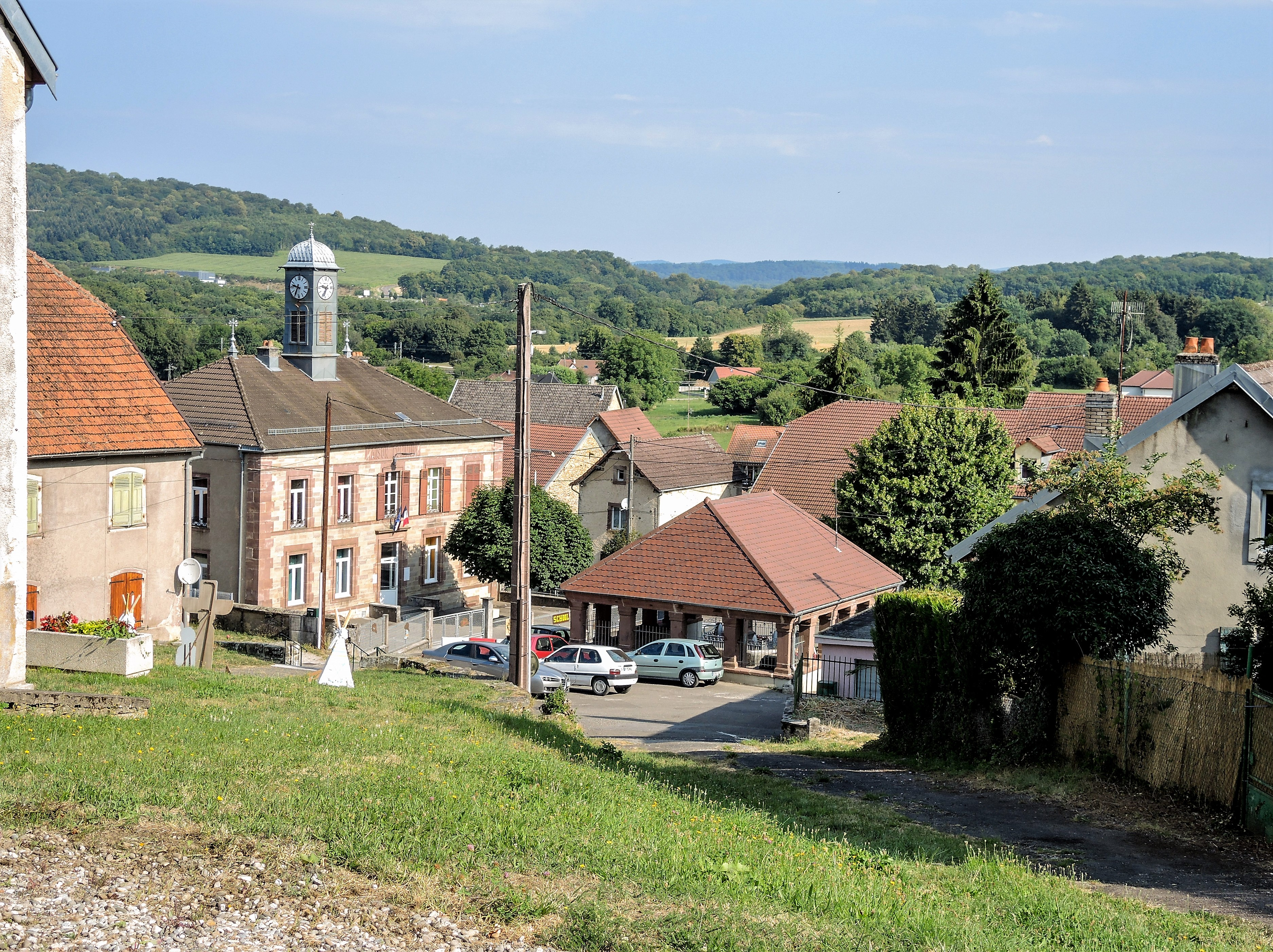
- The centre of Brevilliers
- Location of Brevilliers
- Location within France Location within Bourgogne-Franche-Comté
- Coordinates: 47°34′56″N 6°47′34″E
- Country: France
- Region: Bourgogne-Franche-Comté
- Department: Haute-Saône
- Arrondissement: Lure
- Canton: Héricourt-1
- Intercommunality: CC pays d'Héricourt

Government
  - Mayor (2020–2026): Michel Claudel
- Area^{1}: 6.47 km^{2} (2.50 sq mi)
- Highest elevation: 442 m (1,450 ft)
- Lowest elevation: 330 m (1,080 ft)
- Population (2023): 626
  - Density: 96.8/km^{2} (251/sq mi)
- Time zone: UTC+01:00 (CET)
  - Summer (DST): UTC+02:00 (CEST)
- INSEE/Postal code: 70096 /70400
- ^{1} French Land Register data, which excludes lakes, ponds, glaciers > 1 km^{2} (0.386 sq mi or 247 acres) and river estuaries.

Brevilliers (French pronunciation: [bʁəvilje]) is a commune in the Haute-Saône department in the region of Bourgogne-Franche-Comté in eastern France.

== See also ==
- Communes of the Haute-Saône department
