= Frahier-et-Chatebier =

- Commune
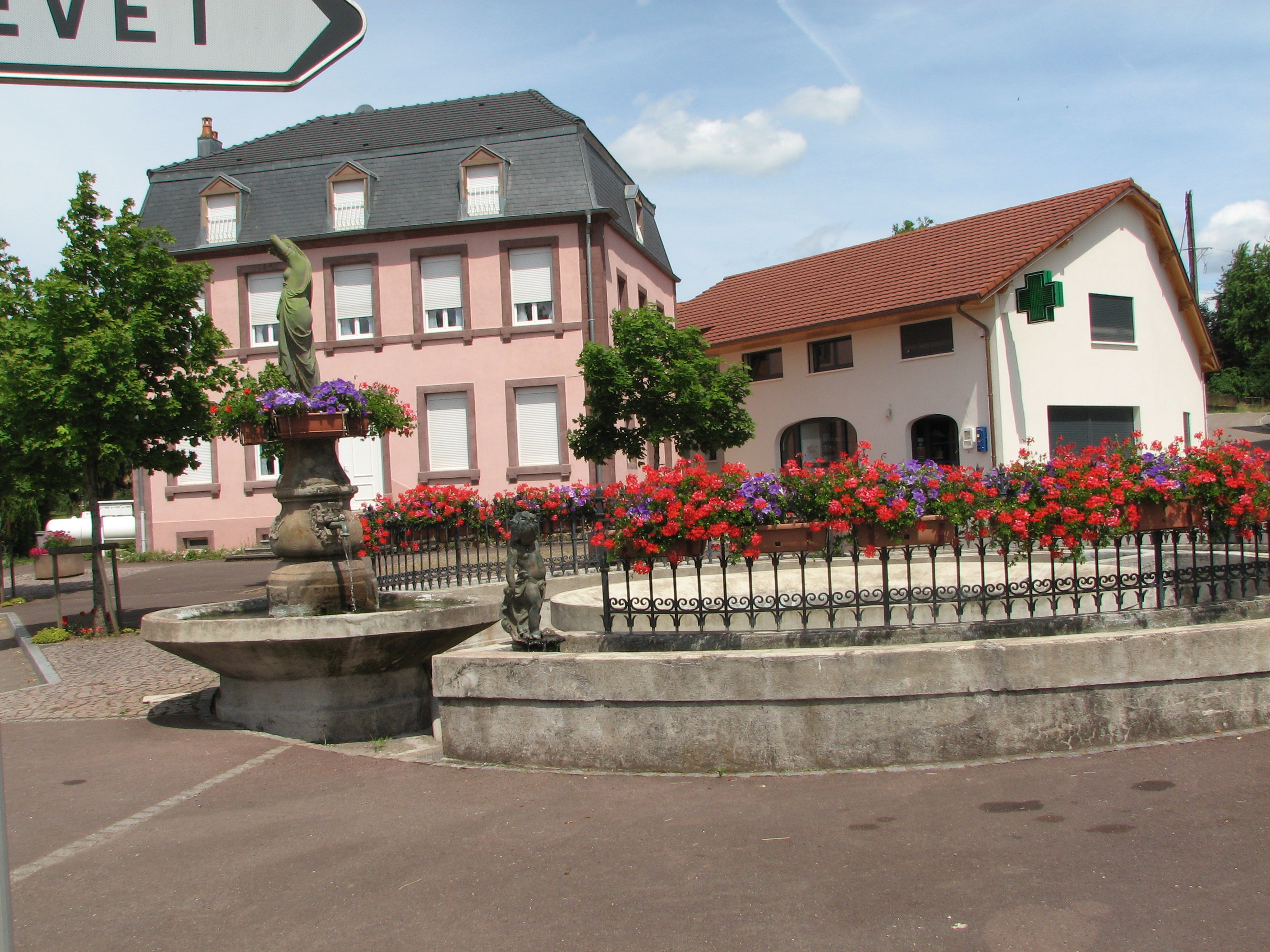
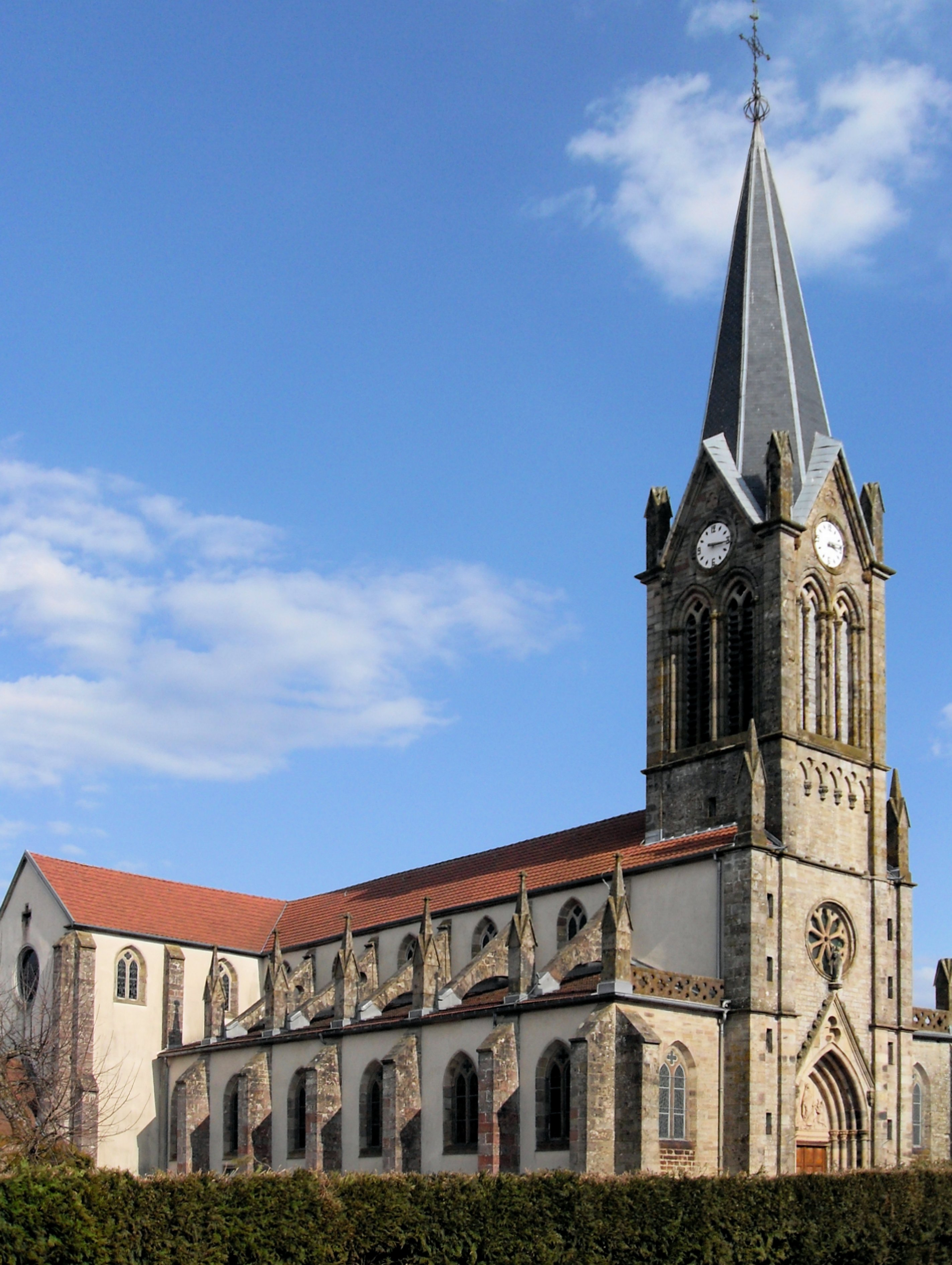
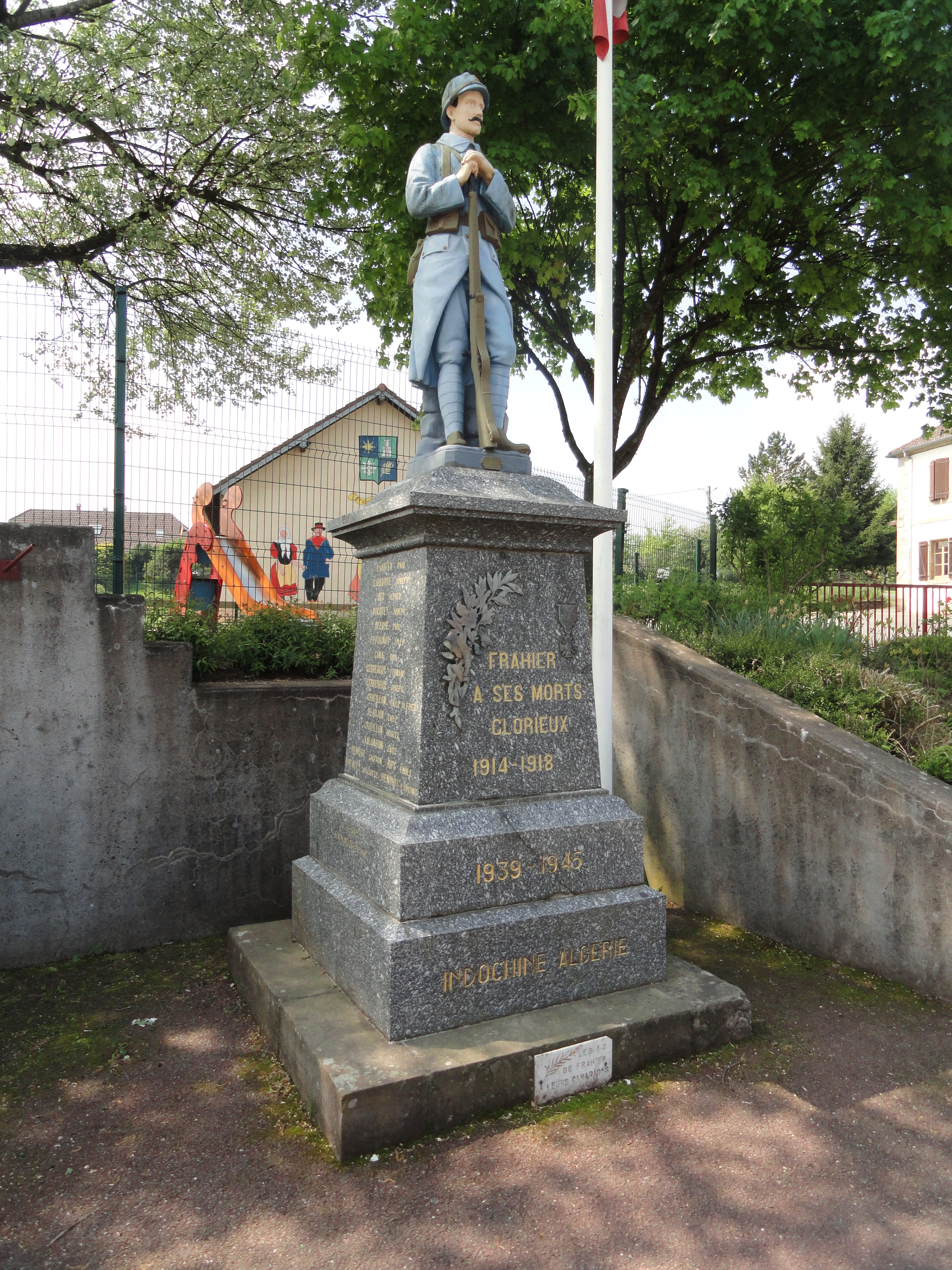
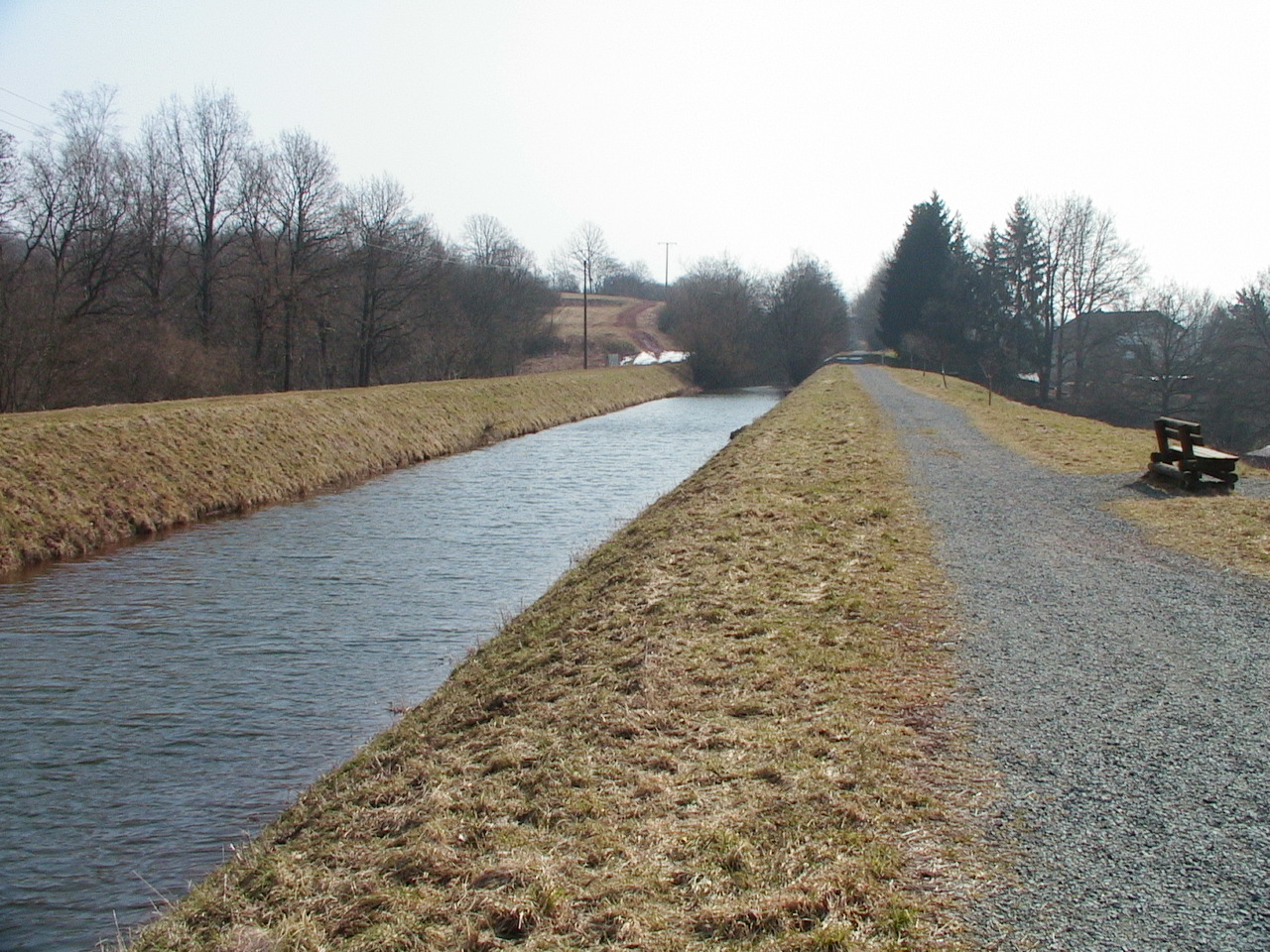
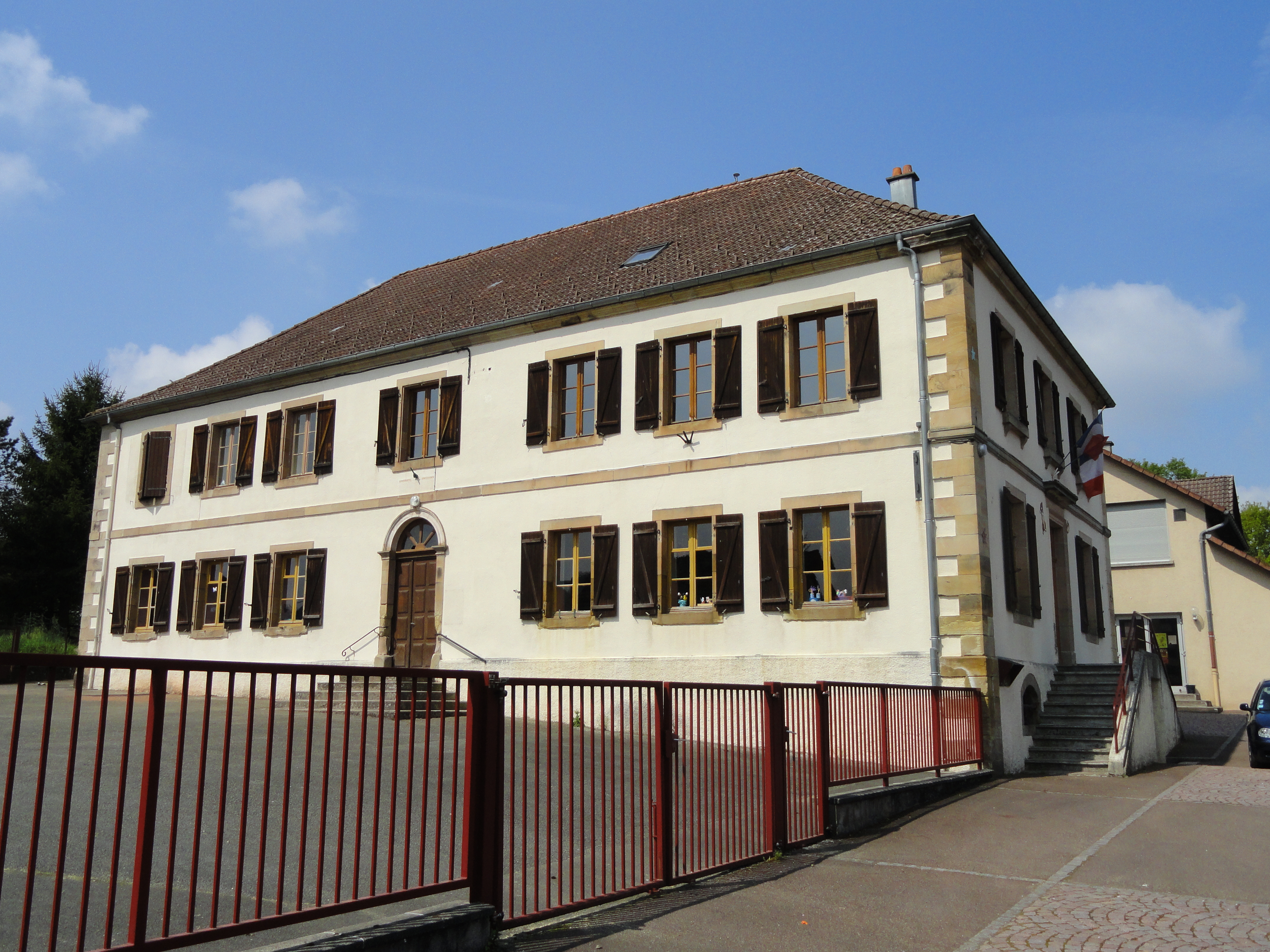

- Coat of arms
- Location of Frahier-et-Chatebier
- Location within France Location within Bourgogne-Franche-Comté
- Coordinates: 47°39′39″N 6°44′54″E
- Country: France
- Region: Bourgogne-Franche-Comté
- Department: Haute-Saône
- Arrondissement: Lure
- Canton: Héricourt-1
- Intercommunality: Rahin et Chérimont

Government
  - Mayor (2020–2026): Karine François
- Area^{1}: 17.39 km^{2} (6.71 sq mi)
- Highest elevation: 493 m (1,617 ft)
- Lowest elevation: 352 m (1,155 ft)
- Population (2023): 1,378
  - Density: 79.24/km^{2} (205.2/sq mi)
- Time zone: UTC+01:00 (CET)
  - Summer (DST): UTC+02:00 (CEST)
- INSEE/Postal code: 70248 /70400
- ^{1} French Land Register data, which excludes lakes, ponds, glaciers > 1 km^{2} (0.386 sq mi or 247 acres) and river estuaries.

Frahier-et-Chatebier (French pronunciation: [fʁaje e ʃatbje]) is a commune in the Haute-Saône department in the region of Bourgogne-Franche-Comté in eastern France.

== See also ==
- Communes of the Haute-Saône department
