= Plancher-les-Mines =

- Commune
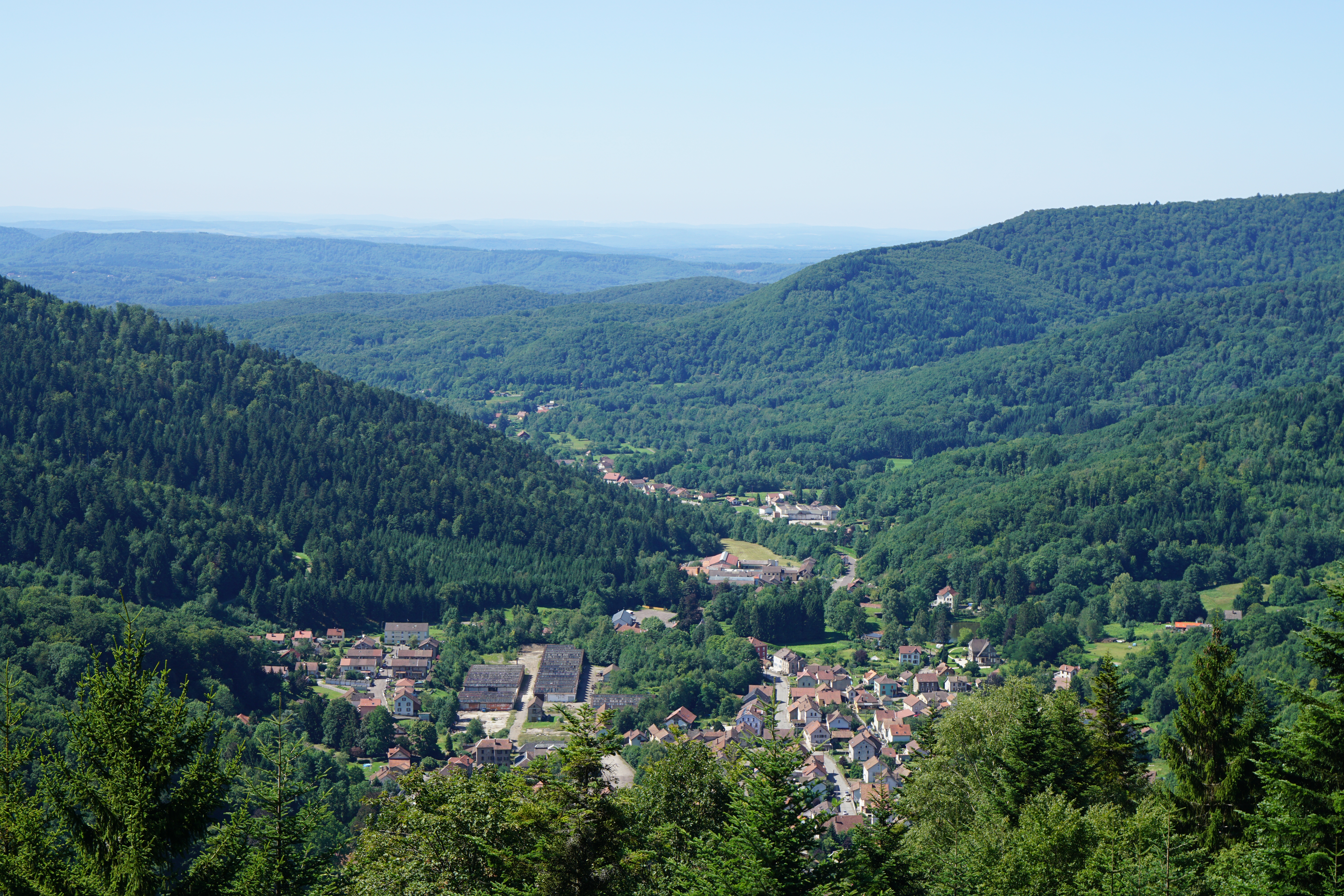
- A general view of the village and the surrounding hills

- Coat of arms
- Location of Plancher-les-Mines
- Location within France Location within Bourgogne-Franche-Comté
- Coordinates: 47°45′42″N 6°44′35″E
- Country: France
- Region: Bourgogne-Franche-Comté
- Department: Haute-Saône
- Arrondissement: Lure
- Canton: Héricourt-1
- Intercommunality: Rahin et Chérimont

Government
  - Mayor (2020–2026): Michel Galmiche
- Area^{1}: 25.59 km^{2} (9.88 sq mi)
- Highest elevation: 1,215 m (3,986 ft)
- Lowest elevation: 483 m (1,585 ft)
- Population (2023): 839
  - Density: 32.8/km^{2} (84.9/sq mi)
- Time zone: UTC+01:00 (CET)
  - Summer (DST): UTC+02:00 (CEST)
- INSEE/Postal code: 70414 /70290
- ^{1} French Land Register data, which excludes lakes, ponds, glaciers > 1 km^{2} (0.386 sq mi or 247 acres) and river estuaries.

Plancher-les-Mines (French pronunciation: [plɑ̃ʃe le min]) is a commune in the Haute-Saône department in the region of Bourgogne-Franche-Comté in eastern France. It is a small village close to the ski station at La Planche des Belles Filles. There is one elementary school located near the church, and a small cinema.

== See also ==
- Communes of the Haute-Saône department
