= Errevet =

- Commune
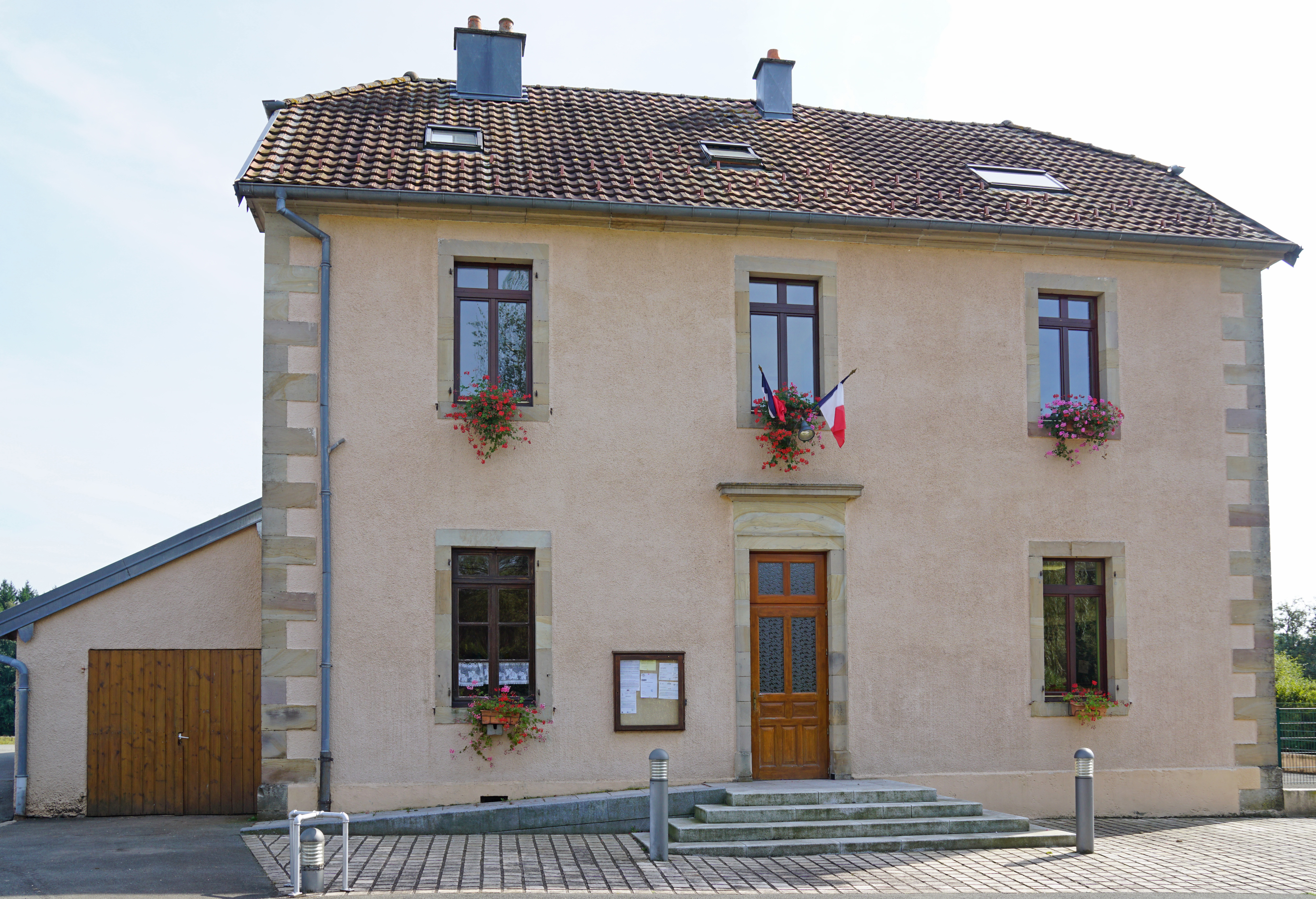
- The town hall in Errevet
- Location of Errevet
- Location within France Location within Bourgogne-Franche-Comté
- Coordinates: 47°41′09″N 6°46′35″E
- Country: France
- Region: Bourgogne-Franche-Comté
- Department: Haute-Saône
- Arrondissement: Lure
- Canton: Héricourt-1
- Intercommunality: Rahin et Chérimont

Government
  - Mayor (2024–2026): Christian Marconot
- Area^{1}: 3.28 km^{2} (1.27 sq mi)
- Highest elevation: 511 m (1,677 ft)
- Lowest elevation: 367 m (1,204 ft)
- Population (2023): 271
  - Density: 82.6/km^{2} (214/sq mi)
- Time zone: UTC+01:00 (CET)
  - Summer (DST): UTC+02:00 (CEST)
- INSEE/Postal code: 70215 /70400
- ^{1} French Land Register data, which excludes lakes, ponds, glaciers > 1 km^{2} (0.386 sq mi or 247 acres) and river estuaries.

Errevet is a commune in the Haute-Saône department in the region of Bourgogne-Franche-Comté in eastern France.

== See also ==
- Communes of the Haute-Saône department
