= Champagney, Haute-Saône =

Champagney
- Commune
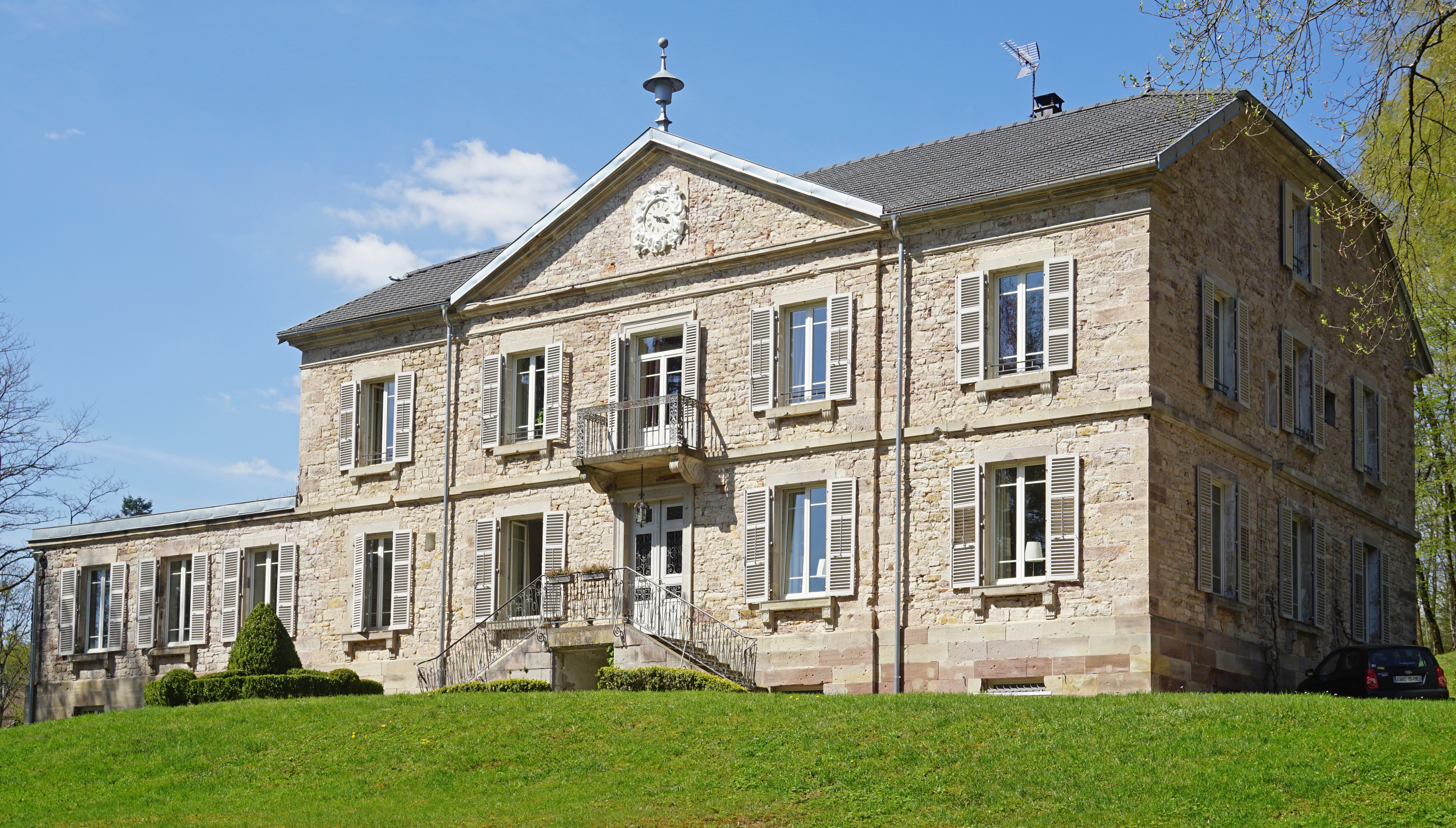
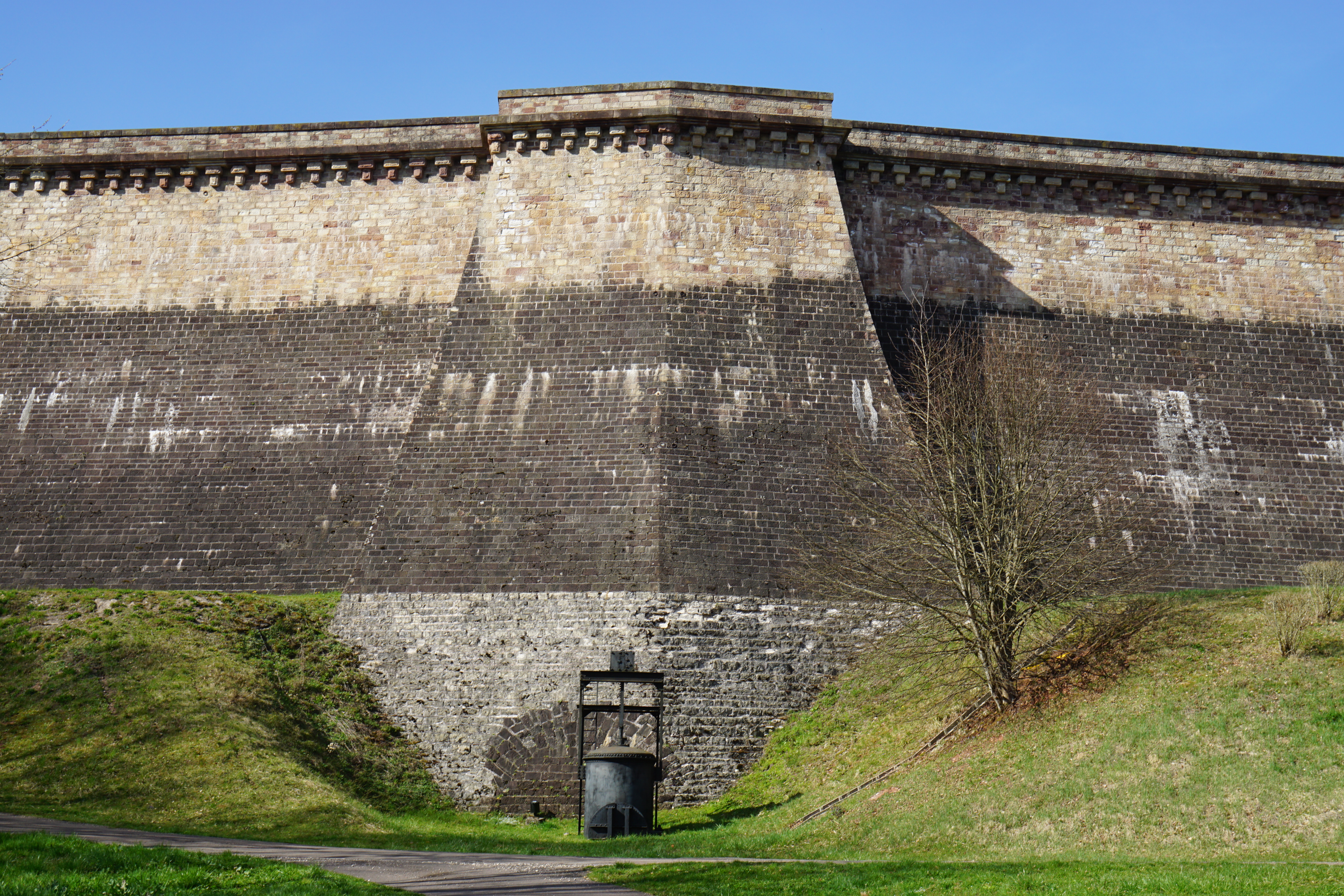
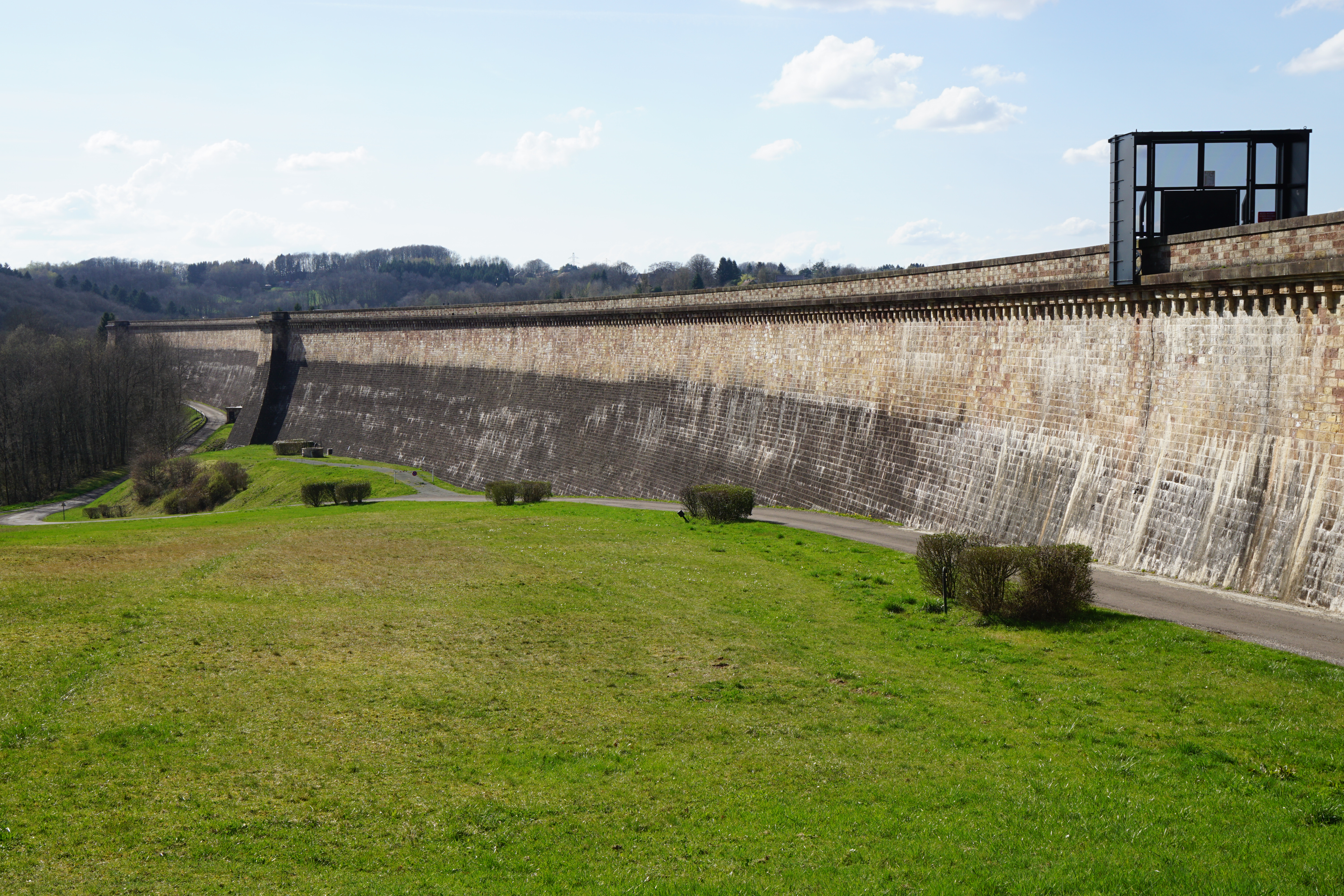
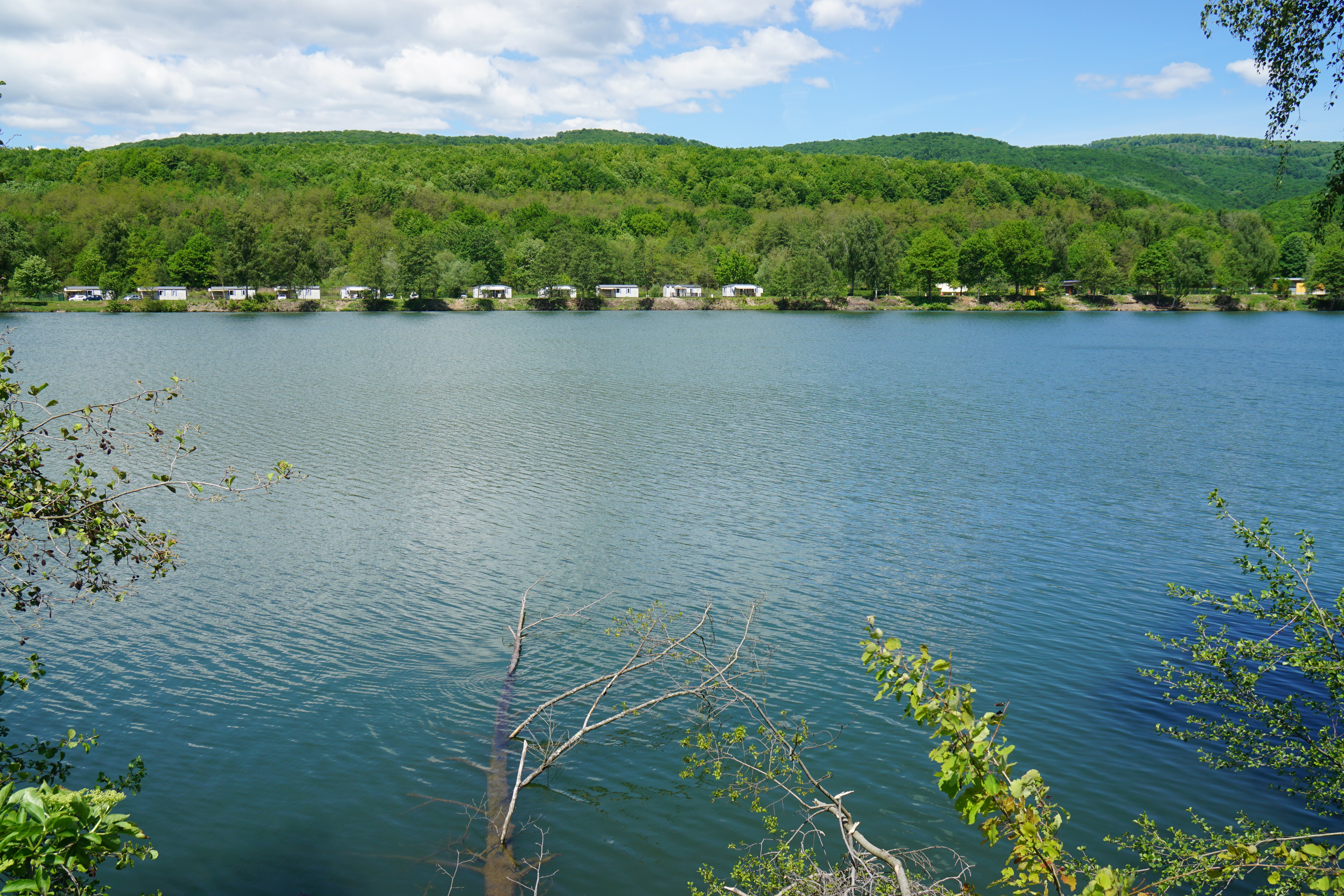

- Coat of arms
- Location of Champagney
- Location within France Location within Bourgogne-Franche-Comté
- Coordinates: 47°42′23″N 6°40′58″E
- Country: France
- Region: Bourgogne-Franche-Comté
- Department: Haute-Saône
- Arrondissement: Lure
- Canton: Héricourt-1
- Intercommunality: Rahin et Chérimont

Government
  - Mayor (2020–2026): Marie-Claire Faivre
- Area^{1}: 36.71 km^{2} (14.17 sq mi)
- Highest elevation: 680 m (2,230 ft)
- Lowest elevation: 343 m (1,125 ft)
- Population (2023): 3,647
  - Density: 99.35/km^{2} (257.3/sq mi)
- Time zone: UTC+01:00 (CET)
  - Summer (DST): UTC+02:00 (CEST)
- INSEE/Postal code: 70120 /70290
- ^{1} French Land Register data, which excludes lakes, ponds, glaciers > 1 km^{2} (0.386 sq mi or 247 acres) and river estuaries.

Champagney (French pronunciation: [ʃɑ̃paɲɛ]) is a commune in the Haute-Saône department in the region of Bourgogne-Franche-Comté in eastern France.

== Population ==
Historical population
| Year | Pop. | ±% p.a. |
|---|---|---|
| 1968 | 2,912 | — |
| 1975 | 3,068 | +0.75% |
| 1982 | 3,275 | +0.94% |
| 1990 | 3,283 | +0.03% |
| 1999 | 3,310 | +0.09% |
| 2007 | 3,601 | +1.06% |
| 2012 | 3,800 | +1.08% |
| 2017 | 3,788 | −0.06% |
| 2023 | 3,647 | −0.63% |
Source: INSEE

== See also ==
- Communes of the Haute-Saône department
- Ronchamp coal mines
- Hamlet of La Houillère
