= Échavanne =

- Commune
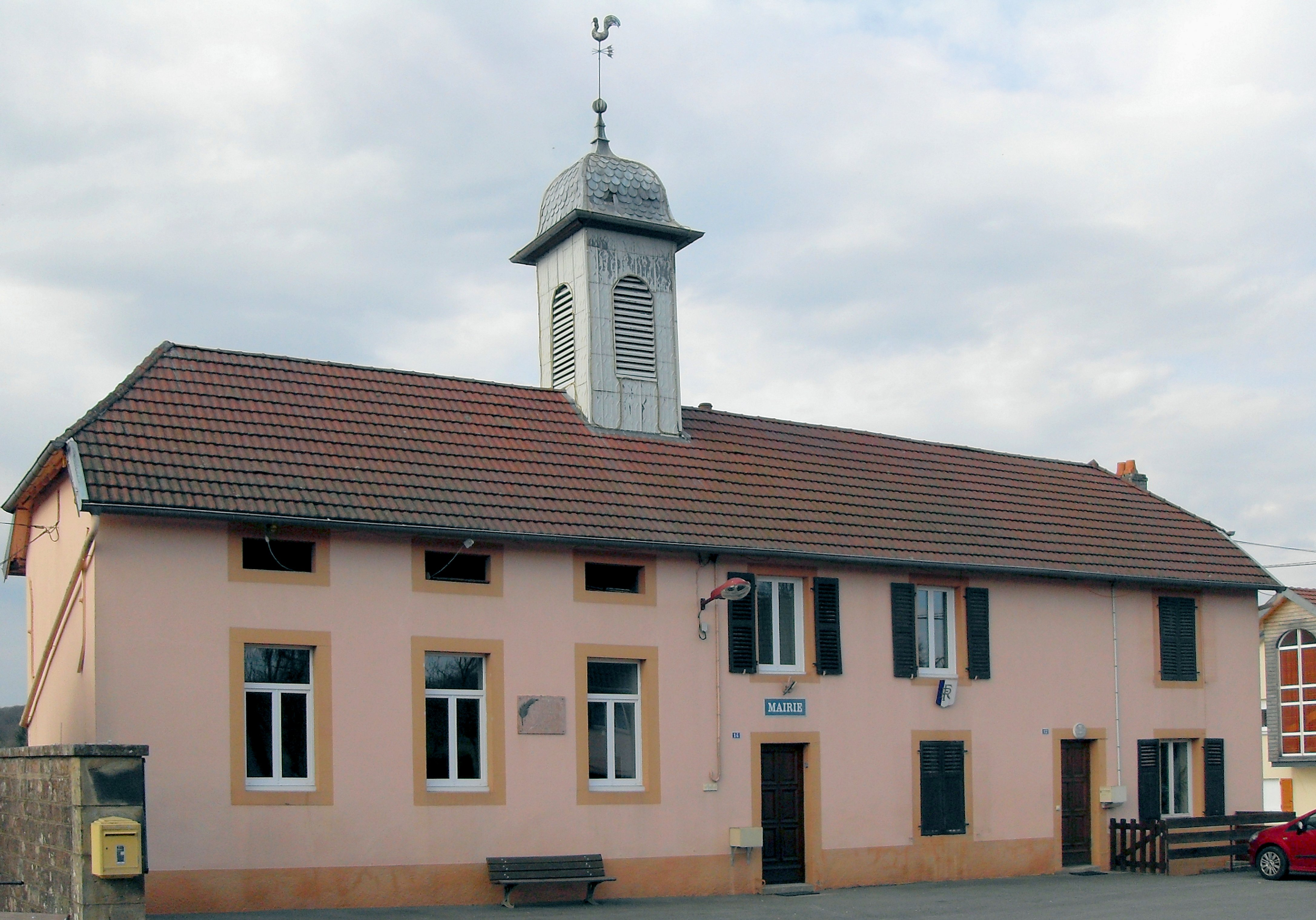
- The town hall

- Coat of arms
- Location of Échavanne
- Location within France Location within Bourgogne-Franche-Comté
- Coordinates: 47°39′28″N 6°43′56″E
- Country: France
- Region: Bourgogne-Franche-Comté
- Department: Haute-Saône
- Arrondissement: Lure
- Canton: Héricourt-1
- Intercommunality: Rahin et Chérimont

Government
  - Mayor (2020–2026): Patrick Cardot
- Area^{1}: 3.21 km^{2} (1.24 sq mi)
- Highest elevation: 444 m (1,457 ft)
- Lowest elevation: 351 m (1,152 ft)
- Population (2023): 199
  - Density: 62.0/km^{2} (161/sq mi)
- Time zone: UTC+01:00 (CET)
  - Summer (DST): UTC+02:00 (CEST)
- INSEE/Postal code: 70205 /70400
- ^{1} French Land Register data, which excludes lakes, ponds, glaciers > 1 km^{2} (0.386 sq mi or 247 acres) and river estuaries.

Échavanne (French pronunciation: [eʃavan]) is a commune in the Haute-Saône department in the region of Bourgogne-Franche-Comté in eastern France.

== See also ==
- Communes of the Haute-Saône department
