= Canton of Héricourt-1 =

Coordinates: 47.58°N 6.76°E

The canton of Héricourt-1 is an administrative division of the Haute-Saône department, northeastern France. It was created at the French canton reorganisation which came into effect in March 2015. Its seat is in Héricourt.

It consists of the following communes:

1. Brevilliers
2. Chagey
3. Châlonvillars
4. Champagney
5. Clairegoutte
6. Échavanne
7. Échenans-sous-Mont-Vaudois
8. Errevet
9. Frahier-et-Chatebier
10. Frédéric-Fontaine
11. Héricourt (partly)
12. Luze
13. Mandrevillars
14. Plancher-Bas
15. Plancher-les-Mines
