= Luze, Haute-Saône =

Luze
- Commune
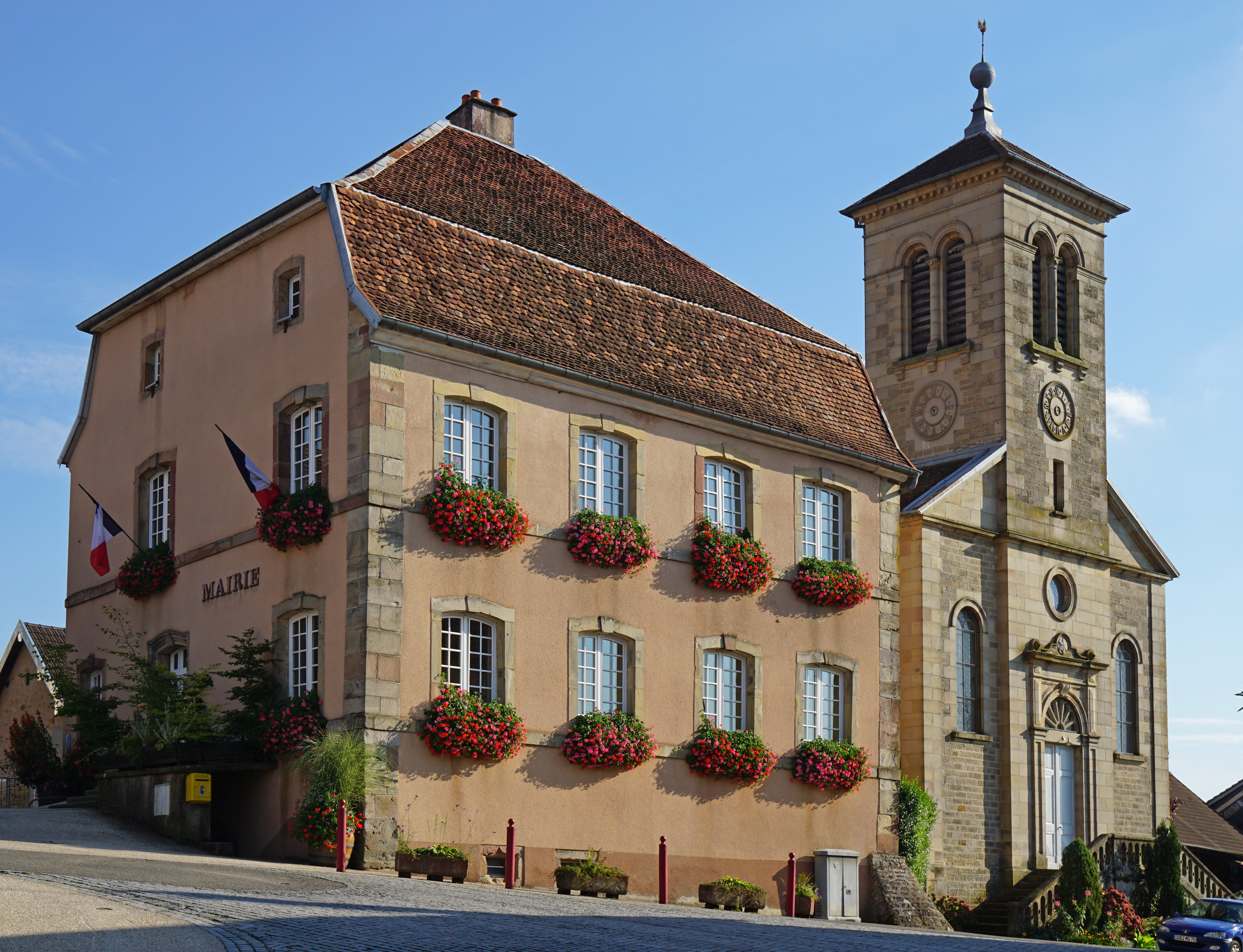
- The town hall in Luze

- Coat of arms
- Location of Luze
- Location within France Location within Bourgogne-Franche-Comté
- Coordinates: 47°35′52″N 6°44′25″E
- Country: France
- Region: Bourgogne-Franche-Comté
- Department: Haute-Saône
- Arrondissement: Lure
- Canton: Héricourt-1
- Intercommunality: CC pays d'Héricourt

Government
  - Mayor (2020–2026): Éric Steib
- Area^{1}: 10.69 km^{2} (4.13 sq mi)
- Highest elevation: 531 m (1,742 ft)
- Lowest elevation: 330 m (1,080 ft)
- Population (2023): 836
  - Density: 78.2/km^{2} (203/sq mi)
- Time zone: UTC+01:00 (CET)
  - Summer (DST): UTC+02:00 (CEST)
- INSEE/Postal code: 70312 /70400
- ^{1} French Land Register data, which excludes lakes, ponds, glaciers > 1 km^{2} (0.386 sq mi or 247 acres) and river estuaries.

Luze (French pronunciation: [lyz]) is a commune in the Haute-Saône department in the region of Bourgogne-Franche-Comté in eastern France.

== See also ==
- Communes of the Haute-Saône department
