= Ronchamp =

- Commune
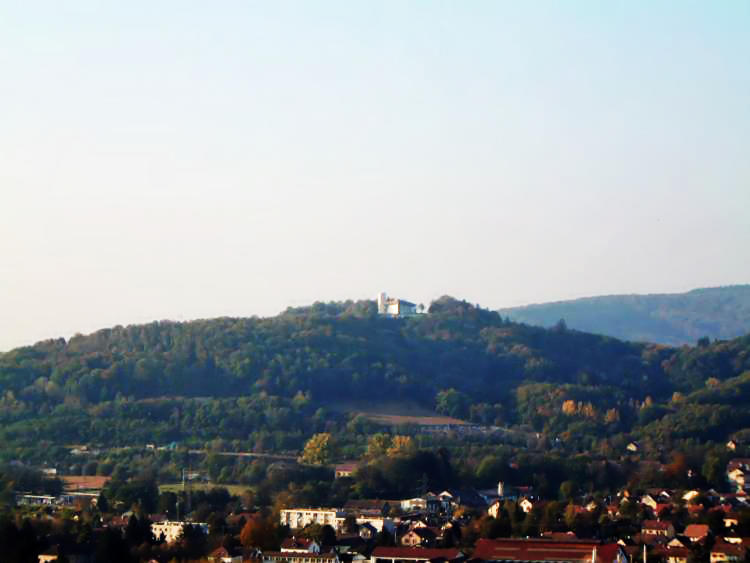
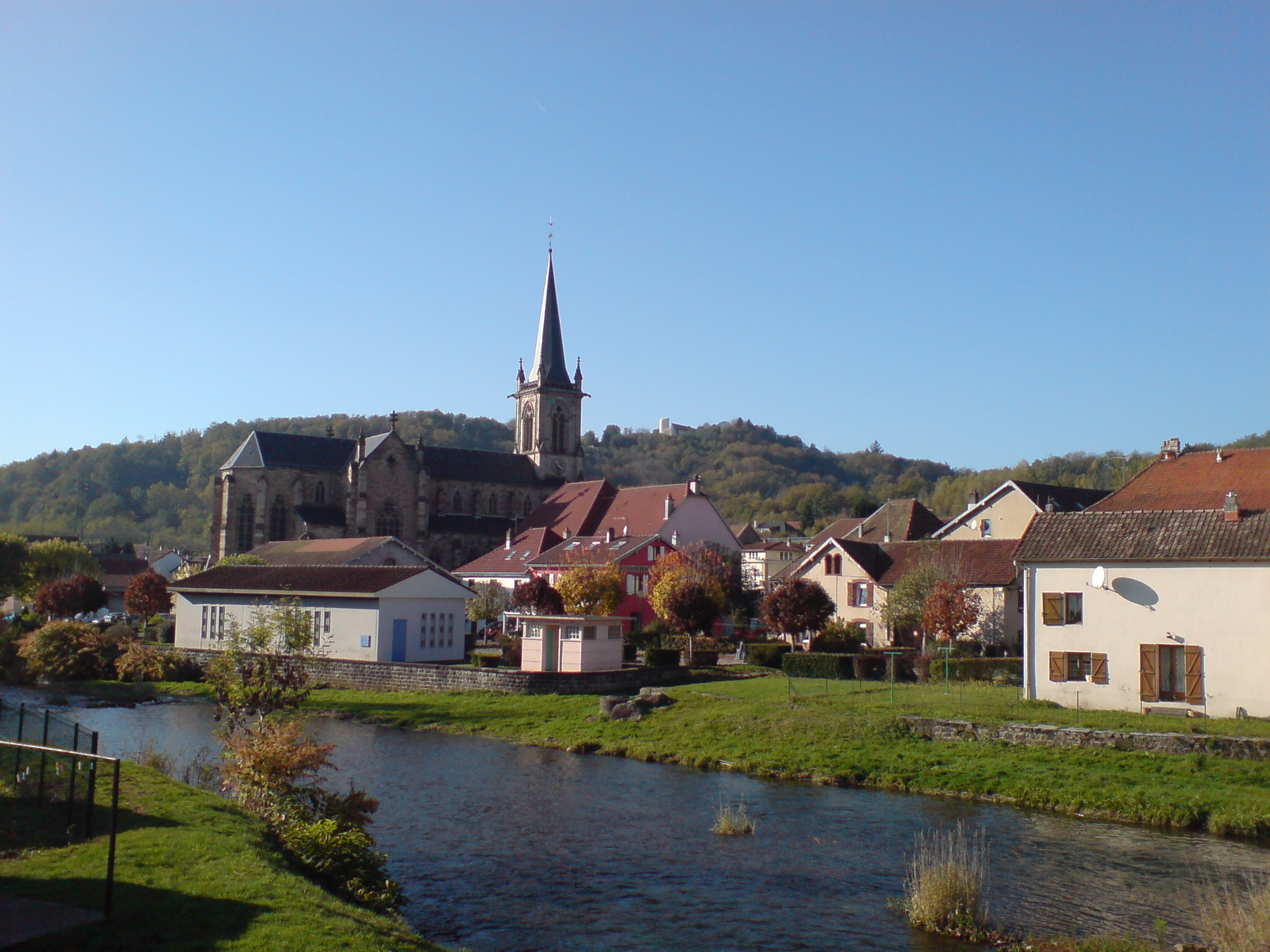
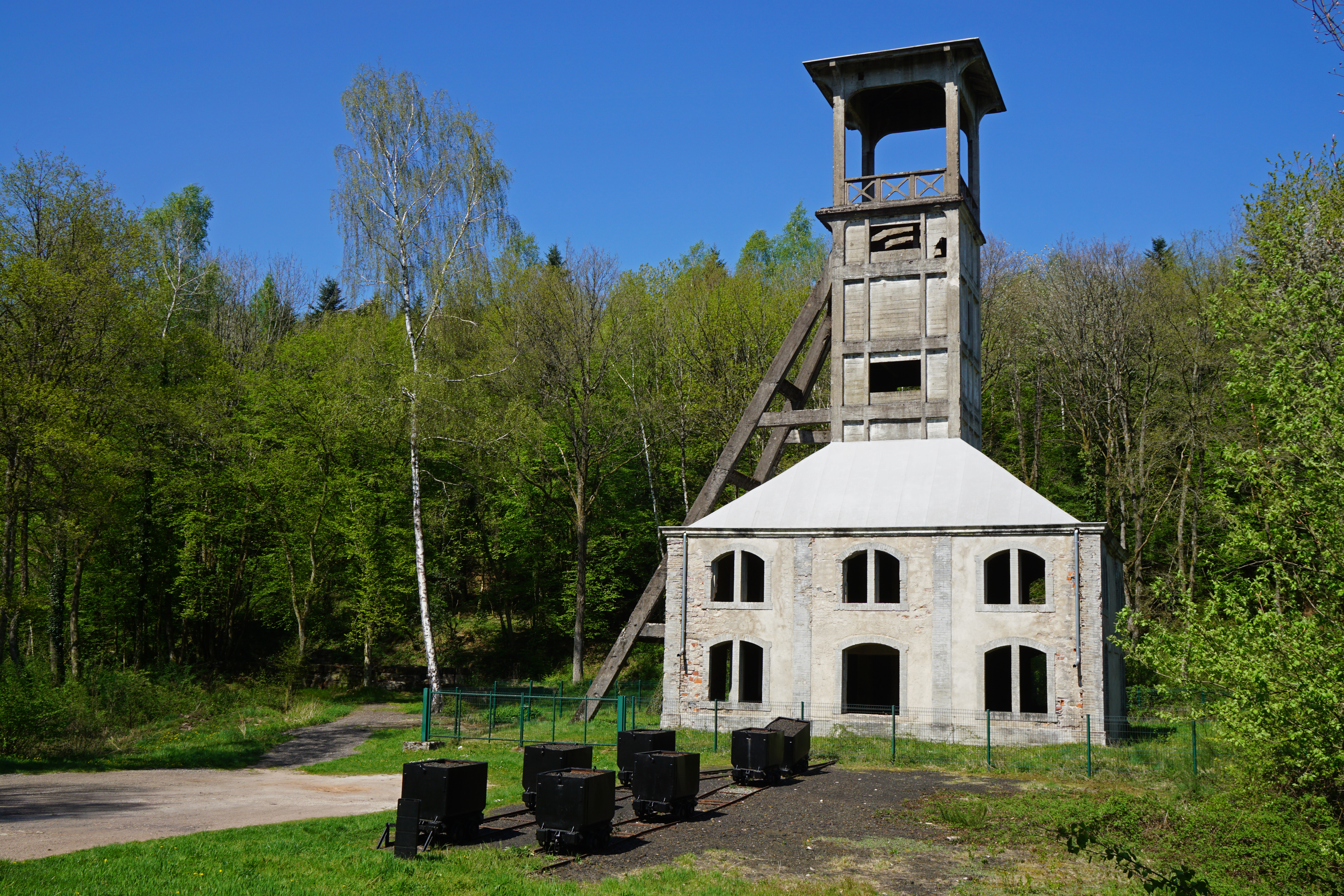
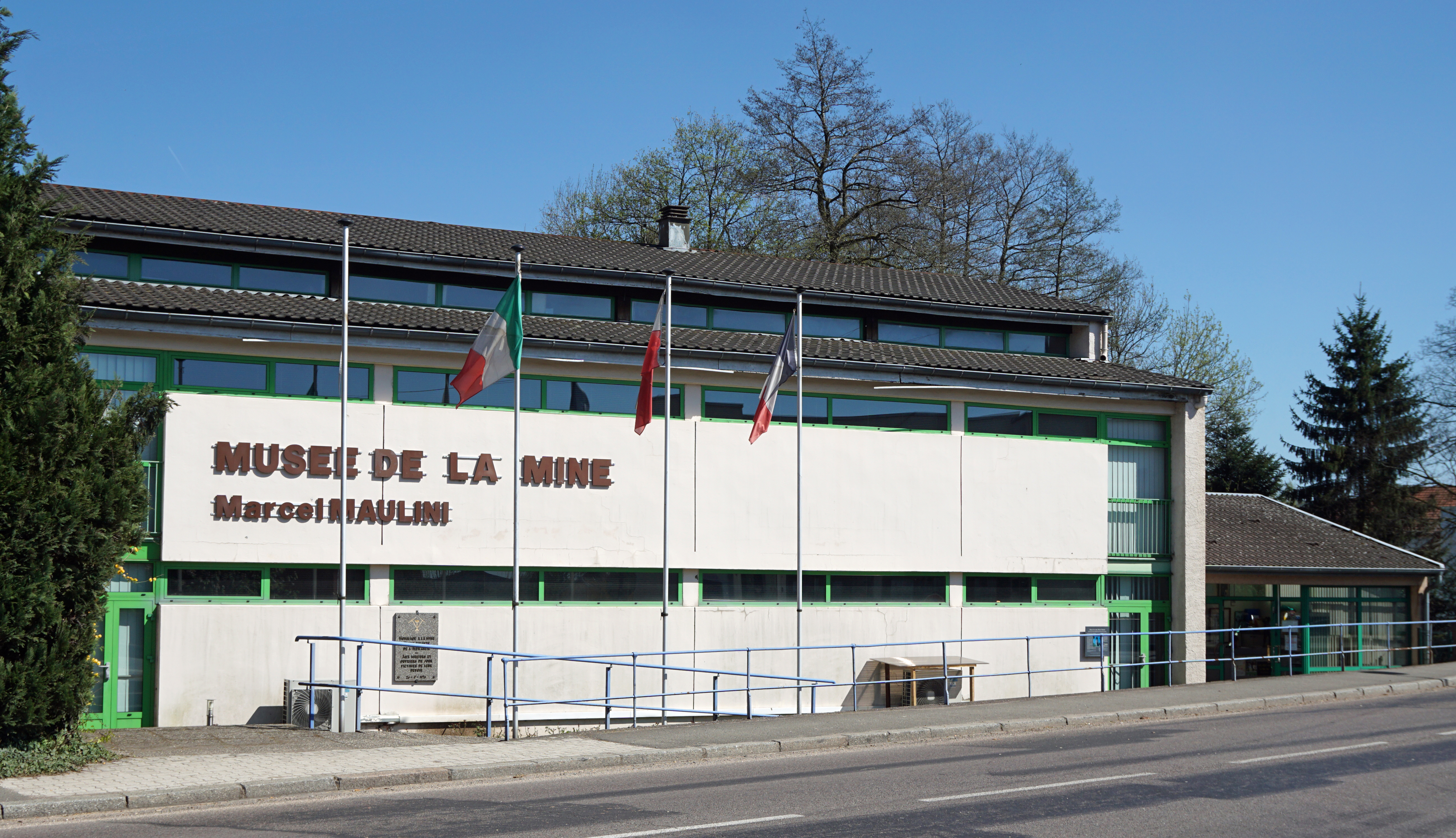
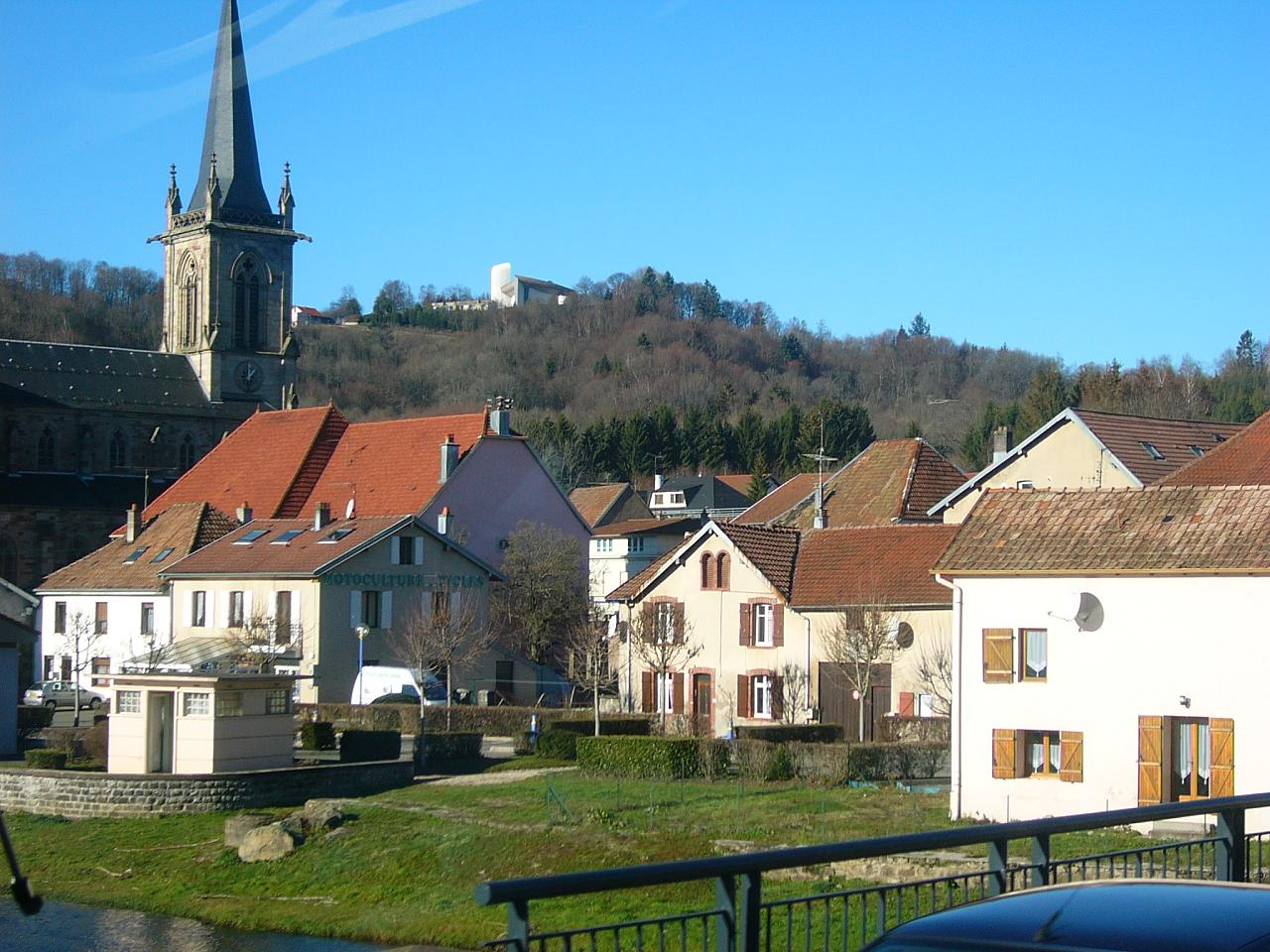
- Location of Ronchamp
- Location within France Location within Bourgogne-Franche-Comté
- Coordinates: 47°42′03″N 6°38′02″E
- Country: France
- Region: Bourgogne-Franche-Comté
- Department: Haute-Saône
- Arrondissement: Lure
- Canton: Lure-1
- Intercommunality: Rahin et Chérimont

Government
  - Mayor (2020–2026): Benoît Cornu
- Area^{1}: 23.54 km^{2} (9.09 sq mi)
- Elevation: 353 m (1,158 ft)
- Highest elevation: 790 m (2,590 ft)
- Lowest elevation: 320 m (1,050 ft)
- Population (2023): 2,737
  - Density: 116.3/km^{2} (301.1/sq mi)
- Time zone: UTC+01:00 (CET)
  - Summer (DST): UTC+02:00 (CEST)
- INSEE/Postal code: 70451 /70250
- ^{1} French Land Register data, which excludes lakes, ponds, glaciers > 1 km^{2} (0.386 sq mi or 247 acres) and river estuaries.

Ronchamp (French pronunciation: [ʁɔ̃ʃɑ̃]) is a commune in the Haute-Saône department in the region of Bourgogne-Franche-Comté in eastern France.

It is located between the Vosges Mountains and the Jura Mountains.

== Mining Museum ==
Mining began in Ronchamp in the mid-18th century and had developed into a full industry by the late 19th century, employing 1500 people. The museum looks back at the miners' work, the techniques and tools they used, and their social life. A collection of miners' lamps is also on display.

== Notre Dame du Haut ==
The chapel of Notre Dame du Haut, designed by Le Corbusier, is located in Ronchamp. It is a shrine for the Catholic Church at Ronchamp and was built for a reformist Church looking to continue its relevancy. Warning against decadence, reformers within the Church looked to renew its spirit by embracing modern art and architecture as representative concepts. Marie-Alain Couturier, who would also sponsor Le Corbusier for the La Tourette commission, steered the unorthodox project to completion in 1954.

This work, like several others in Le Corbusier’s late oeuvre, departs from his principles of standardization and the machine aesthetic outlined in Vers une architecture. In this project, the structural design of the roof was inspired by the engineering of airfoils. It also resembles a nun's coif.

The chapel is clearly a site-specific response. By Le Corbusier’s own admission, it was the site that provided an irresistible genius loci for the response, with the horizon visible on all four sides of the hill and its historical legacy for centuries as a place of worship.

Interior of Notre Dame du Haut (looking up)

This historical legacy weaved in different layers into the terrain — from the Romans and sun-worshippers before them, to a cult of the Virgin in the Middle Ages, right through to the modern church and the fight against the German occupation. Le Corbusier also sensed a sacral relationship of the hill with its surroundings, the Jura mountains in the distance and the hill itself, dominating the landscape.

The nature of the site would result in an architectural ensemble that has many similitudes with the Acropolis, starting from the ascent at the bottom of the hill to architectural and landscape events along the way, before finally terminating at the sanctum sanctorum itself, the chapel.

The building itself is a comparatively small structure enclosed by thick walls, with the upturned roof supported on columns embedded within the walls. In the interior, the spaces left between the wall and roof, as well as asymmetric light from the wall openings serve to further reinforce the sacral nature of the space and buttress the relationship of the building with its surroundings.

== Population ==
Historical population
Year	Pop.	±% p.a.
1968	3,058	—
1975	3,087	+0.13%
1982	3,132	+0.21%
1990	3,088	−0.18%
1999	2,965	−0.45%
2007	2,901	−0.27%
2012	2,930	+0.20%
2017	2,757	−1.21%
2023	2,737	−0.12%
Source: INSEE

== See also ==
- Ronchamp coal mines
- Hamlet of La Houillère
- Étançon mine
