= Communauté de Communes du Pays de Lure =

Municipal federation in France

Pays de Lure
- Communauté de communes
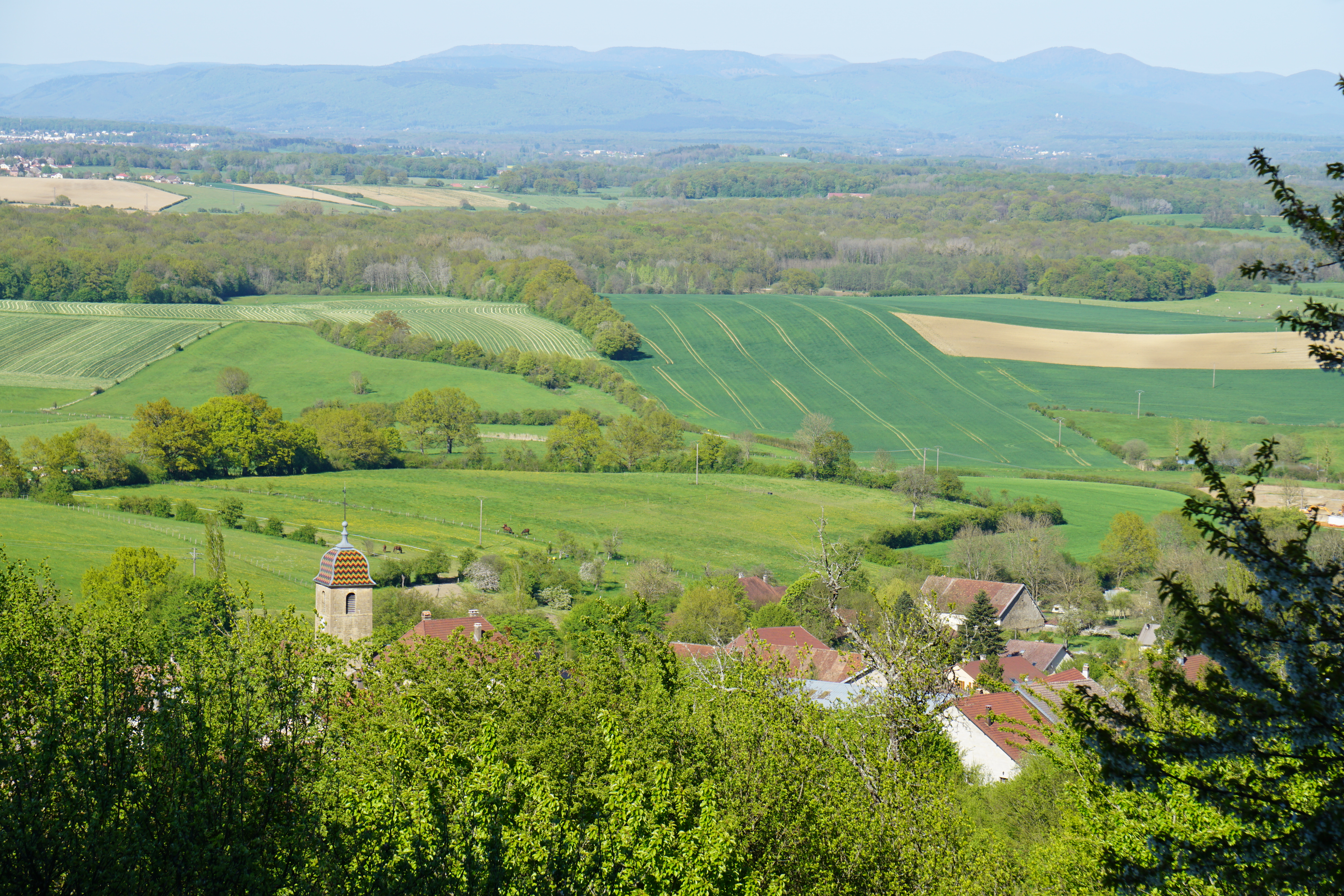
- Country: France
- Region: Bourgogne-Franche-Comté
- Department: Haute-Saône
- No. of communes: {{{nbcomm}}}
- Established: 1 January 1999
- Area: 19,510 km^{2} (7,530 sq mi)
- Population (2021): 19,131
  - Density: 0.9806/km^{2} (2.540/sq mi)
- Website: https://www.pays-de-lure.fr

The Communauté de Communes du Pays de Lure (CCPL by its acronym in French) is a collective of 23 municipalities located in the French department of Haute-Saône.

== History ==
The communauté de communes was created by prefectoral decree on December 16, 1998,: bringing together 8 communes and 12,800 inhabitants. On January 1, 2001, Faymont, until then a member of the Communauté de Communes du Pays de Villersexel, joined the intercommunality, whose territory comprised twenty communes in 2002, 21 communes in 2003 and 22 communes in 2007 (with Vy-lès-Lure).

Under the provisions of the 2011 departmental intercommunal cooperation plan, the communes d'Amblans and de Genevreuille, previously members of the Communauté de Communes des Franches-Communes, joined the CCPL on January 1, 2013.

The law on the new territorial organization of the Republic (loi NOTRe) of August 7, 2015, stipulates that public establishments for intercommunal cooperation (EPCI) with their tax status must have a minimum of 15,000 inhabitants, unless most of the communes making it up are located in mountain areas, for which the threshold is lowered to 5,000 inhabitants. To enable the Communauté de Communes Rahin et Chérimont (CCRC) to be classified as a mountain area and benefit from the corresponding derogation, in October 2015 the Prefect of Haute-Saône presented a draft revision of the schéma départemental de coopération intercommunale (Departmental Intercommunal Cooperation Scheme, SDCI by its acronym in French), proposing in particular that Clairegoutte and Frédéric-Fontaine leave the CCRC to join the Pays de Lure.

The final SDCI, approved by the Prefect on March 30, 2016, confirms, subject to the effective classification of Champagney and Clairegoutte as mountain areas, the departure from the Communauté de Communes Rahin et Chérimont of the communes of:

- Clairegoutte and Frédéric-Fontaine, to join the Communauté de Communes du Pays de Lure ;
- Échavanne, to join Pays d'Héricourt; and
- the integration of Rahin et Chérimont, with its territory reduced to Champagney, Échavanne, Errevet, Frahier-et-Chatebier, Frédéric-Fontaine, Plancher-Bas, Plancher-les-Mines, and Ronchamp.

This merger would take effect on January 1, 2017, after formal consultation of the municipal and community councils concerned.

Champagney and Clairegoutte were classified as “mountain municipalities” in July 2016.

On January 1, 2023, Malbouhans will leave the communauté de communes to join the Communauté de Communes des Mille Étangs (CCME by its acronym in French).

== Community territory ==
=== Geography ===
The Communauté de Communes du Pays de Lure lies to the south of Luxeuil, in the north-east of Haute-Saône, on the Ognon plain. Lure is some fifteen kilometers from the Vosges mountains. The lands of the communauté de communes are grouped around Lure, in an elongated shape running north-south. A distinction is made between Lure-Nord and Lure-Sud.

==== Topography and landscape ====
Unlike the Vosges Saônoises to the north, the area over which the communauté de communes extends is generally flat, with some rolling hills.

Broad plains along the east-west axis accommodate agriculture.

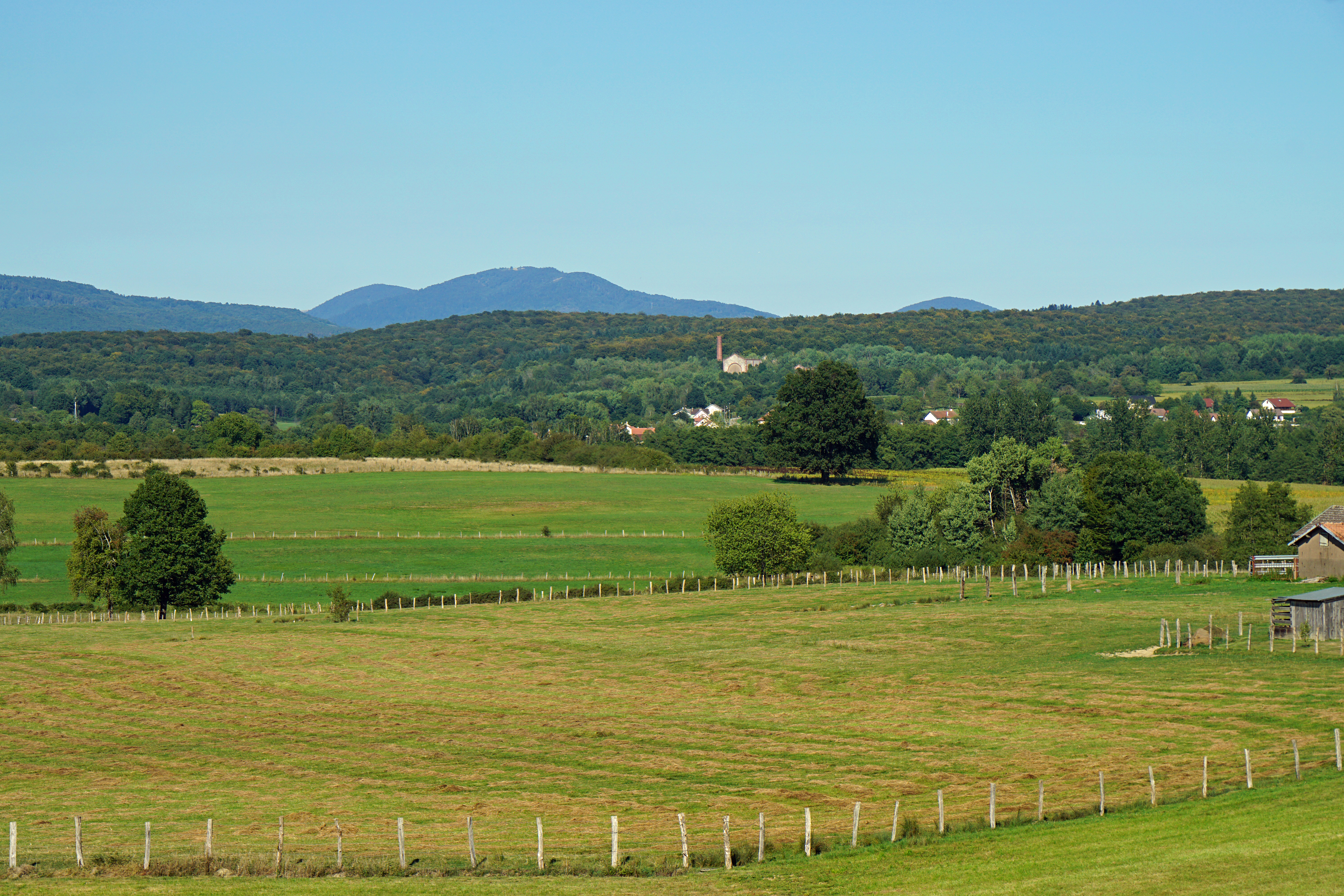
This landscape, photographed in Palante, is typical of the countryside in the Communauté de Communes du Pays de Lure.

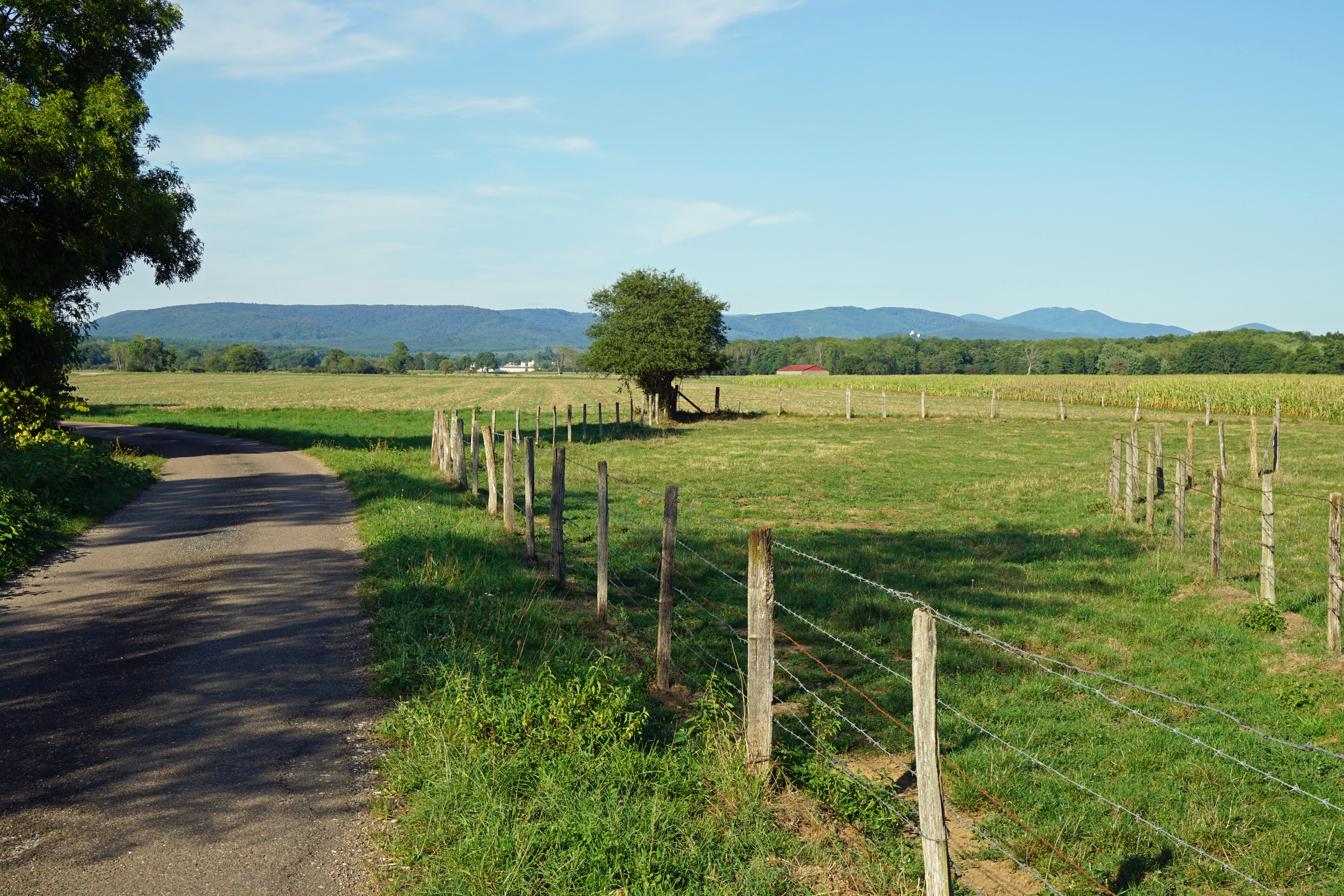
The Roye plain stretches between the village and La Côte. The Vosgesmountains are visible on the horizon.

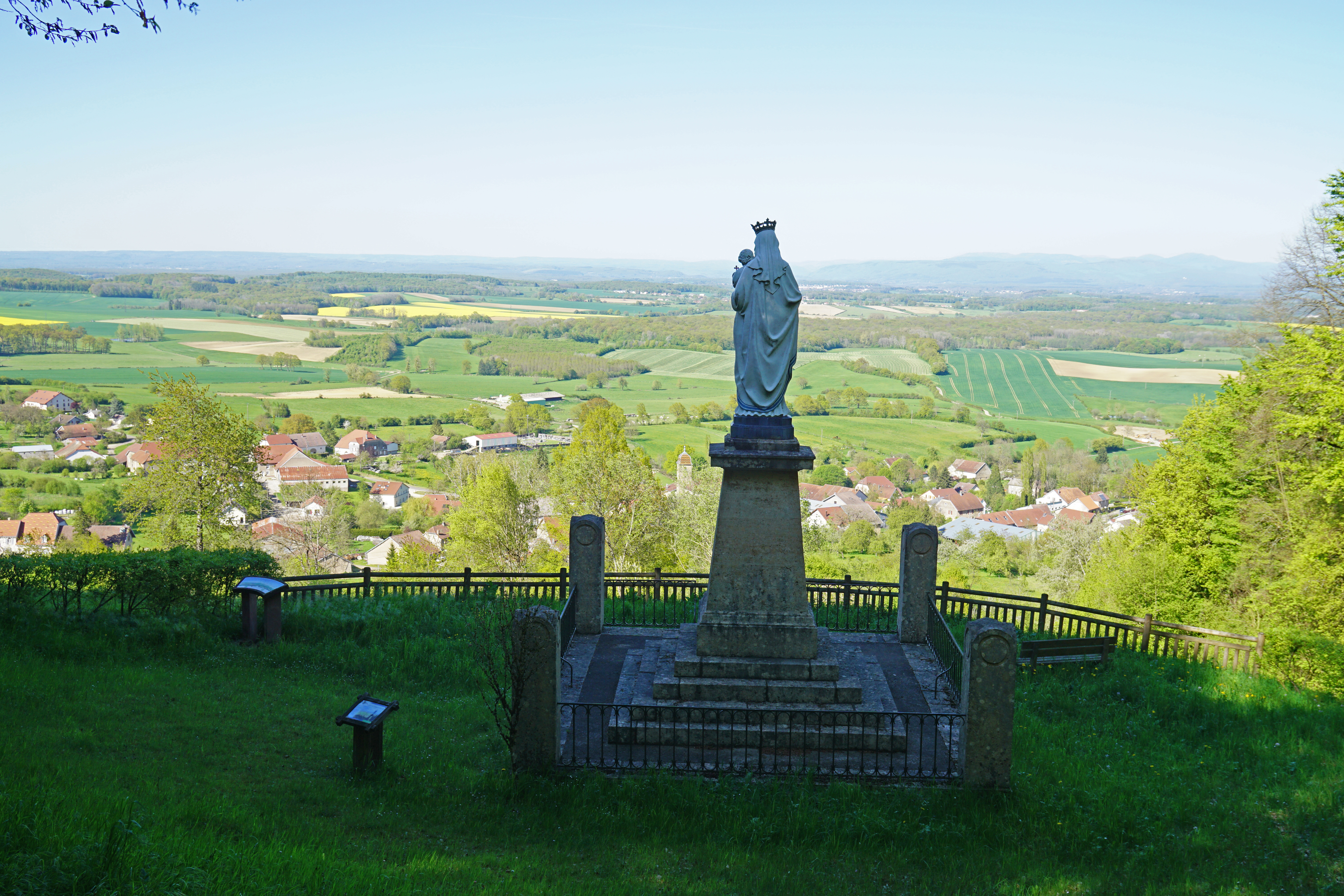
General view of the Lureregion and Vosgesmountains from Mont Gédry in Arpenans.

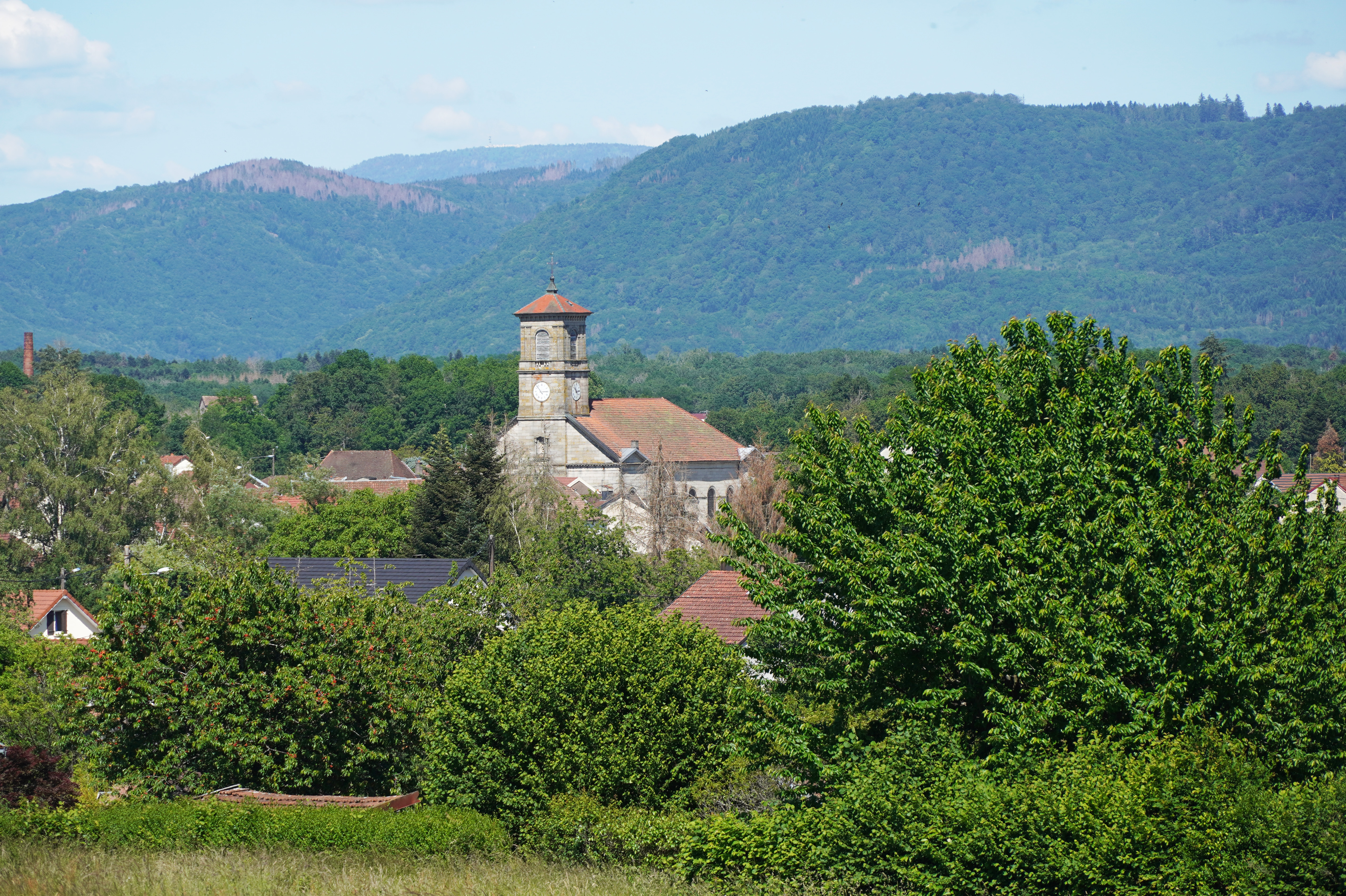
Saint-Germain and the Vosges saônoises donate the Ballon de Servance.

==== Hydrology ====
The river Ognon crosses the region from north-east to south-west. Various tributaries flow into it, notably the Rahin, which flows through La Côte. Various infiltrations of the Ognon give rise to resurgences, such as at Lac de la Fond, in front of the Sous-Préfecture, giving rise to the Reigne. The resurgence of the Noireaud merges with the Bourbier. Other watercourses also exist, such as the Ruisseau Notre-Dame.

The Grande Pile peat bog in Saint-Germain is a reference point for the climatic history of Western Europe. It provides a record of climatic fluctuations over the last 135,000 years. It also boasts a rich diversity of wetlands, with all the evolutionary phases of a peat bog represented. It is also home to rare and endangered species.

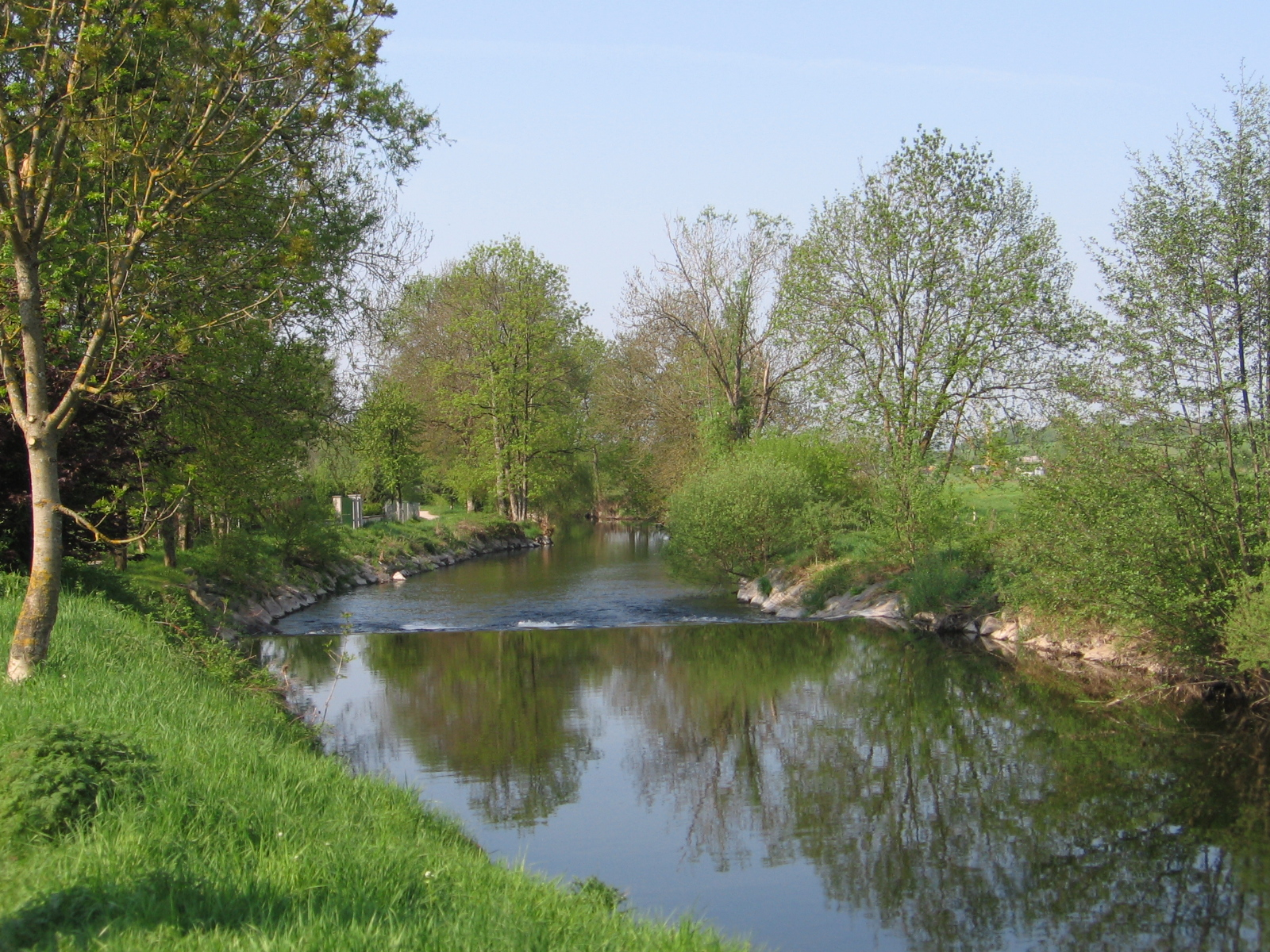
The Ognon near Lure.

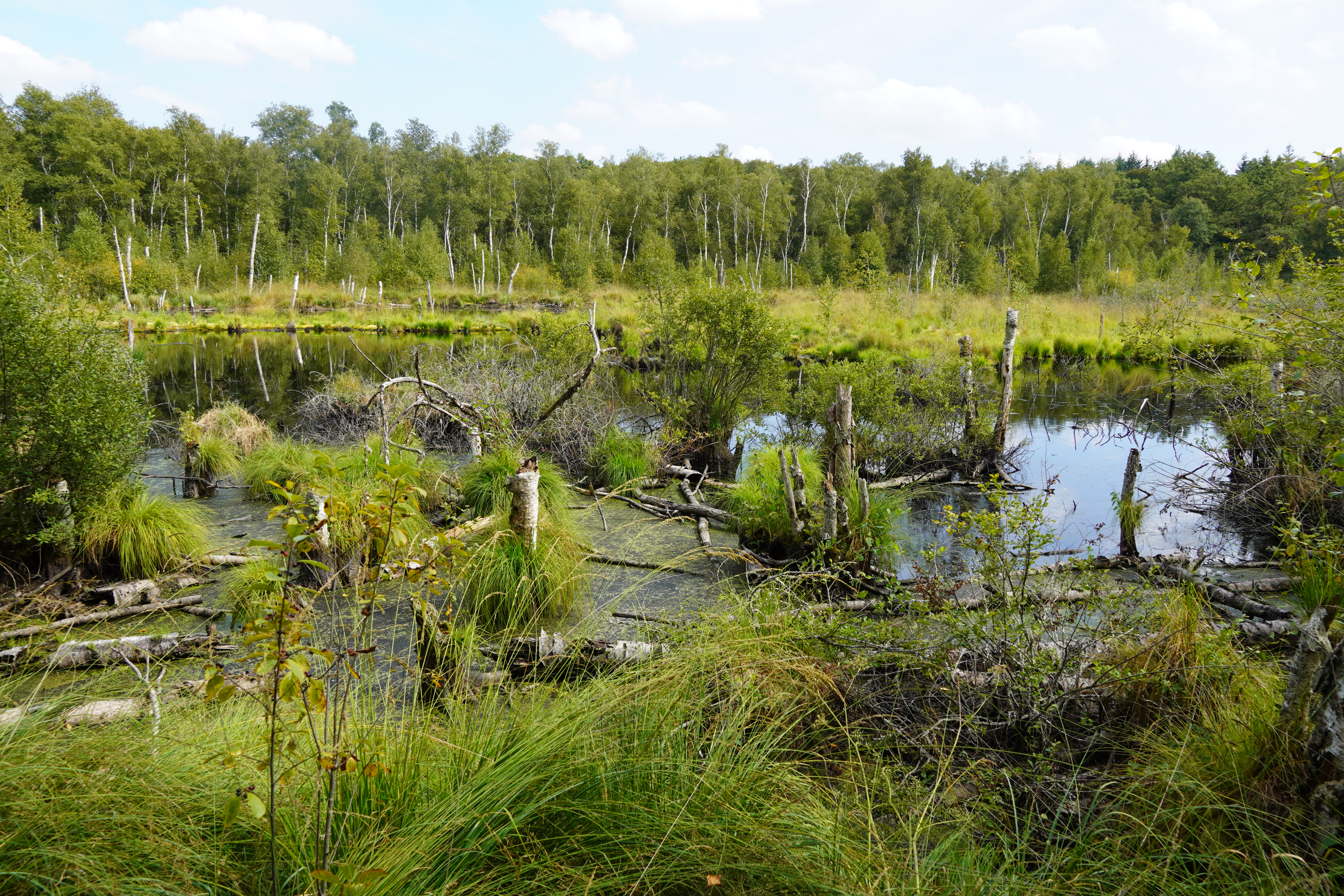
The Grande Pile peat bog in Saint-Germain.

==== Transport ====
Two expressways serve Lure and the surrounding area. The RN19 runs east-west (Vesoul-Héricourt), providing rapid access to the surrounding villages. The D64 provides access to Luxeuil-les-Bains.

Lure station is at the junction of the Paris-Est to Mulhouse-Ville line and the Blainville - Damelevières to Lure line.

=== Economy ===
Knauf Group, in La Côte, manufactures ceiling tiles and insulation panels based on wood wool.

Valmetal, also based in La Côte, France's leading manufacturer of street sweepers and scrubbers. Faurecia, based in Magny-Vernois, a subcontractor to the automotive industry which produces car seats, notably for Peugeot, and employs over 550 people. It is a Seveso-classified site.

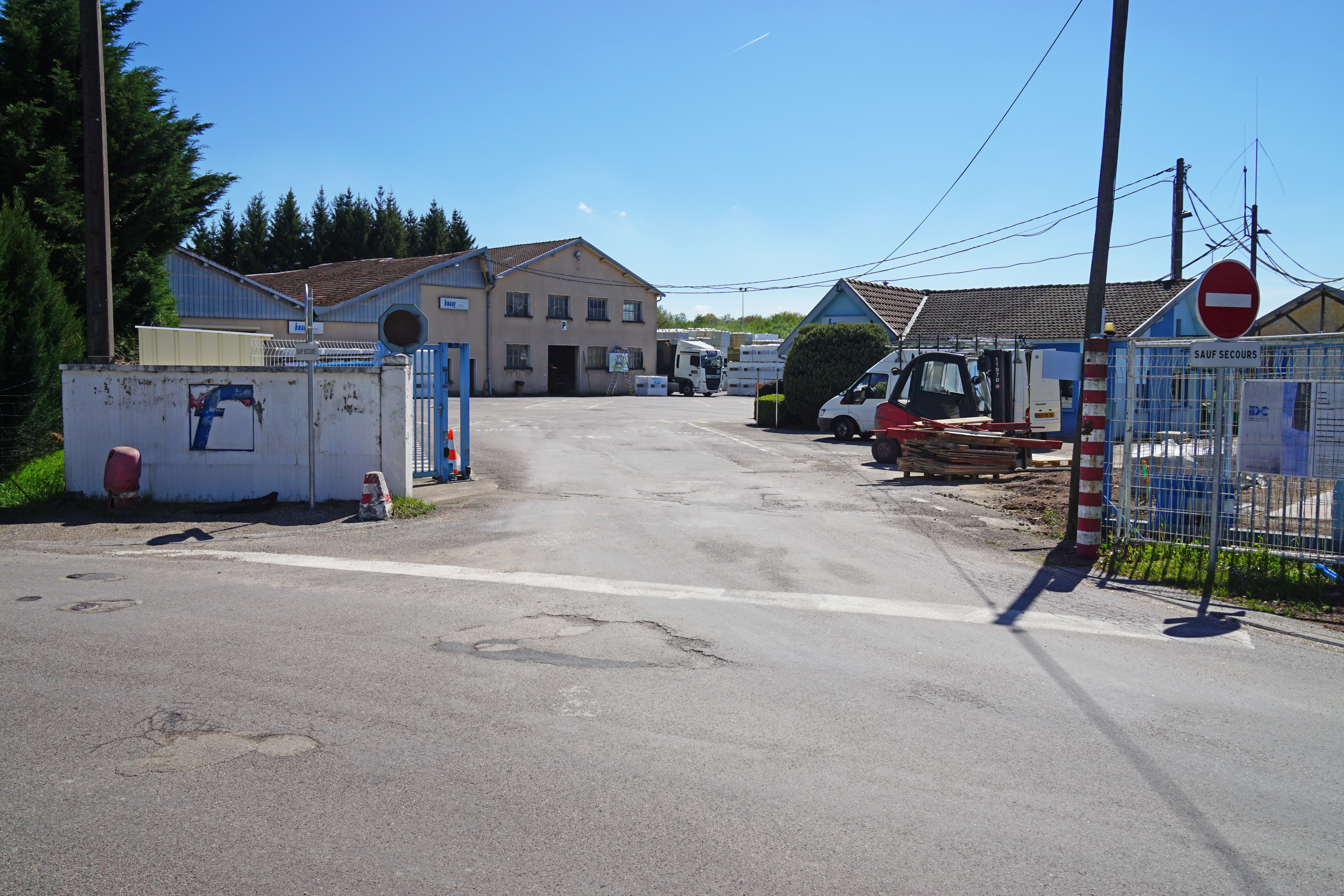
Knauf Group manufactures slabs of wood wool insulation panels in La Côte.

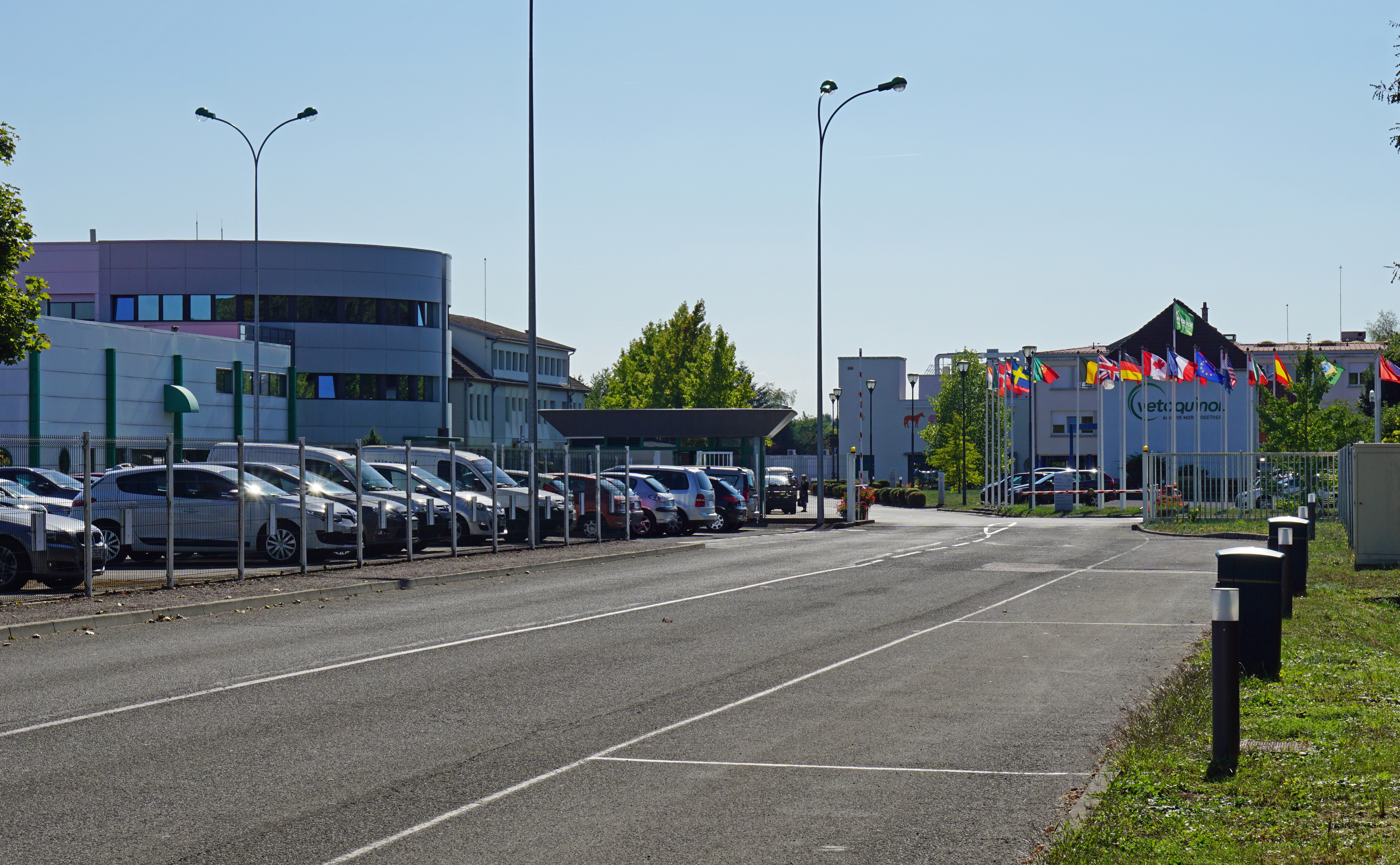
Vetoquinol, veterinary pharmaceutical laboratory in Magny-Vernois.

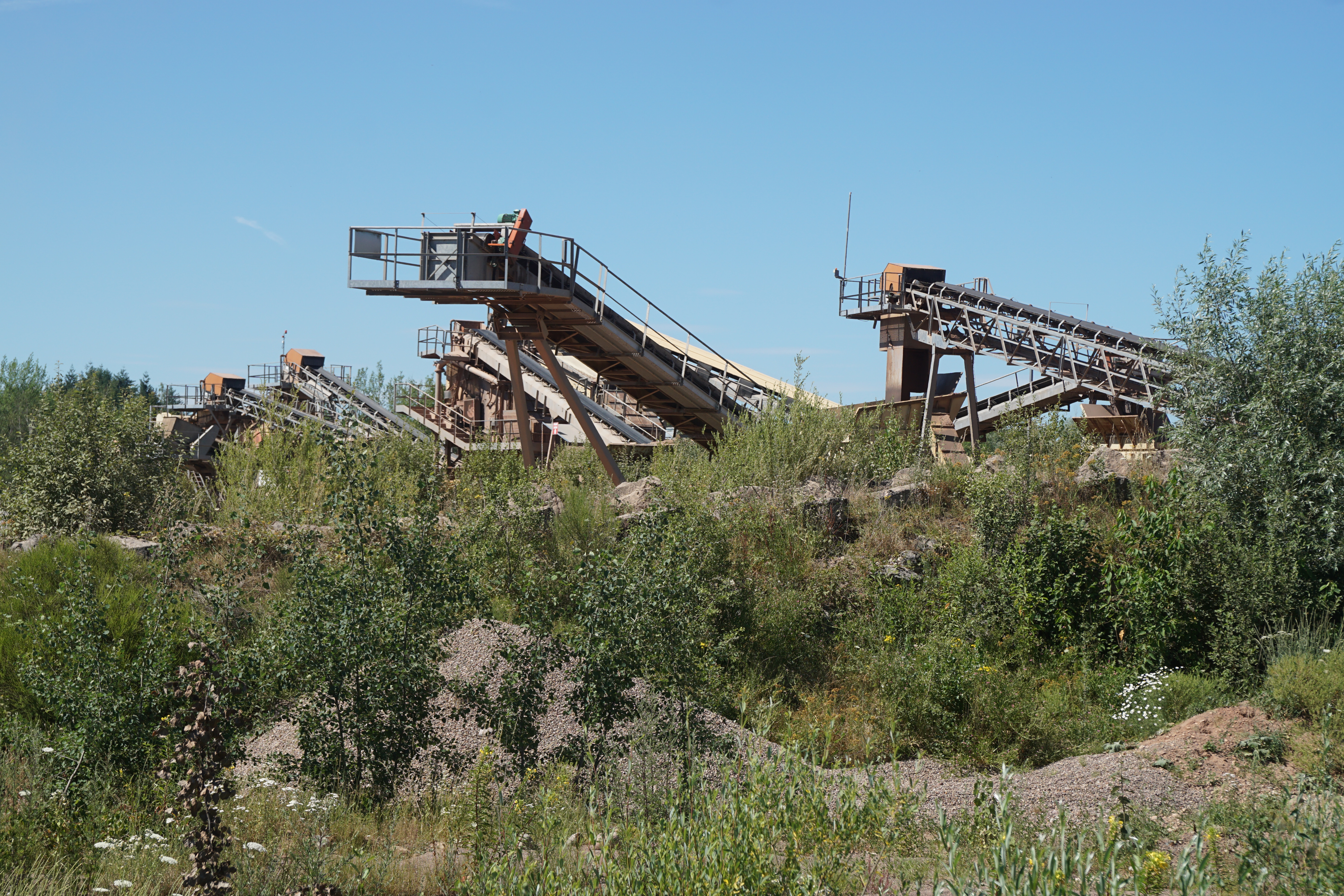
Aggregate sandpit at Roye.

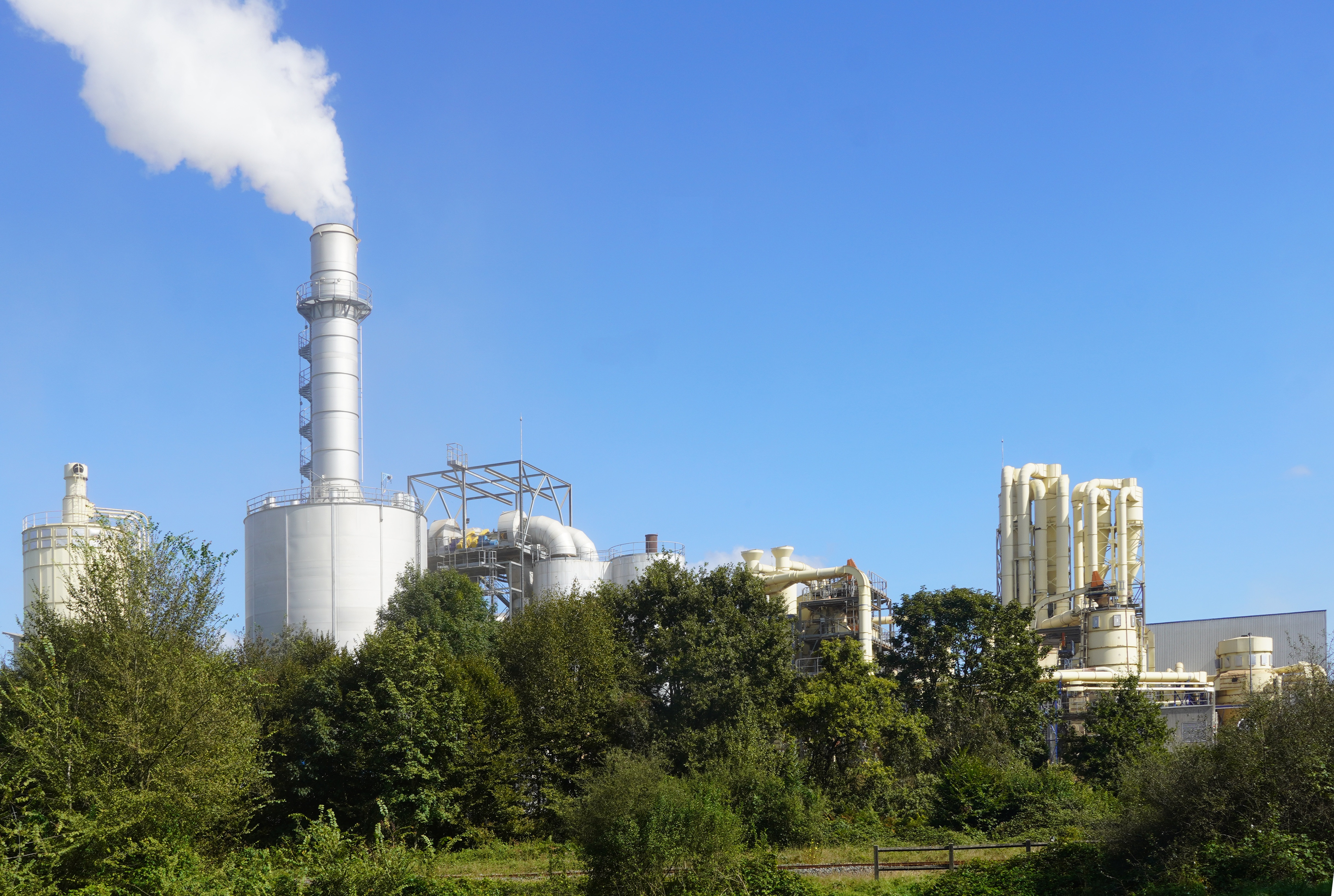
CF2P produces particleboard panels in Lure.

=== Composition ===
The communauté de communes is made up of the following 23 communes:

List of communes in the intercommunal area
Name	Code Insee	Demonym	Area (km^{2})	Population (latest legal population)	Density (inhab./km2)
Lure	70310	Lurons	24,31	7 918 (2021)	326
Amblans-et-Velotte	70014	Ambellipontains	9,76	414 (2021)	42
Andornay	70021	Andornois	1,48	183 (2021)	124
Arpenans	70029	Catalans	11,8	238 (2021)	20
Les Aynans	70046		7,82	362 (2021)	46
La Côte	70178	Cotais	6,93	526 (2021)	76
Faymont	70229	Faymontais	7,99	258 (2021)	32
Froideterre	70259	Froideterriens	2,83	364 (2021)	129
Frotey-lès-Lure	70260		7,21	694 (2021)	96
Genevreuille	70262	Génevrulles	6,42	154 (2021)	24
Lomont	70306	Lomontois	11,35	474 (2021)	42
Lyoffans	70313		4,49	427 (2021)	95
Magny-Danigon	70318		7,52	446 (2021)	59
Magny-Jobert	70319		3,68	131 (2021)	36
Magny-Vernois	70321	Vernoisiens	6,38	1 368 (2021)	214
Moffans-et-Vacheresse	70348	Moffanois	14,09	615 (2021)	44
La Neuvelle-lès-Lure	70385	Neuvellois	4,88	314 (2021)	64
Palante	70403	Palantins	3,46	243 (2021)	70
Roye	70455	Royens	10,37	1 482 (2021)	143
Saint-Germain	70464		14,12	1 364 (2021)	97
Le Val-de-Gouhenans	70515	Vallois	3,88	67 (2021)	17
Vouhenans	70577	Vouhenanais	8,36	382 (2021)	46
Vy-lès-Lure	70581	Vy-les-Lurons	16	707 (2021)	44

=== Demographics ===
Demographic evolution of the community territory as existing on January 1, 2024
1968	1975	1982	1990	1999	2010	2015	2021
15 225	16 739	17 814	17 812	17 825	18 986	19 334	19 131

== Organization ==
=== Head office ===
The intercommunal head office is in Lure, ZA de la Saline, Rue des Berniers.

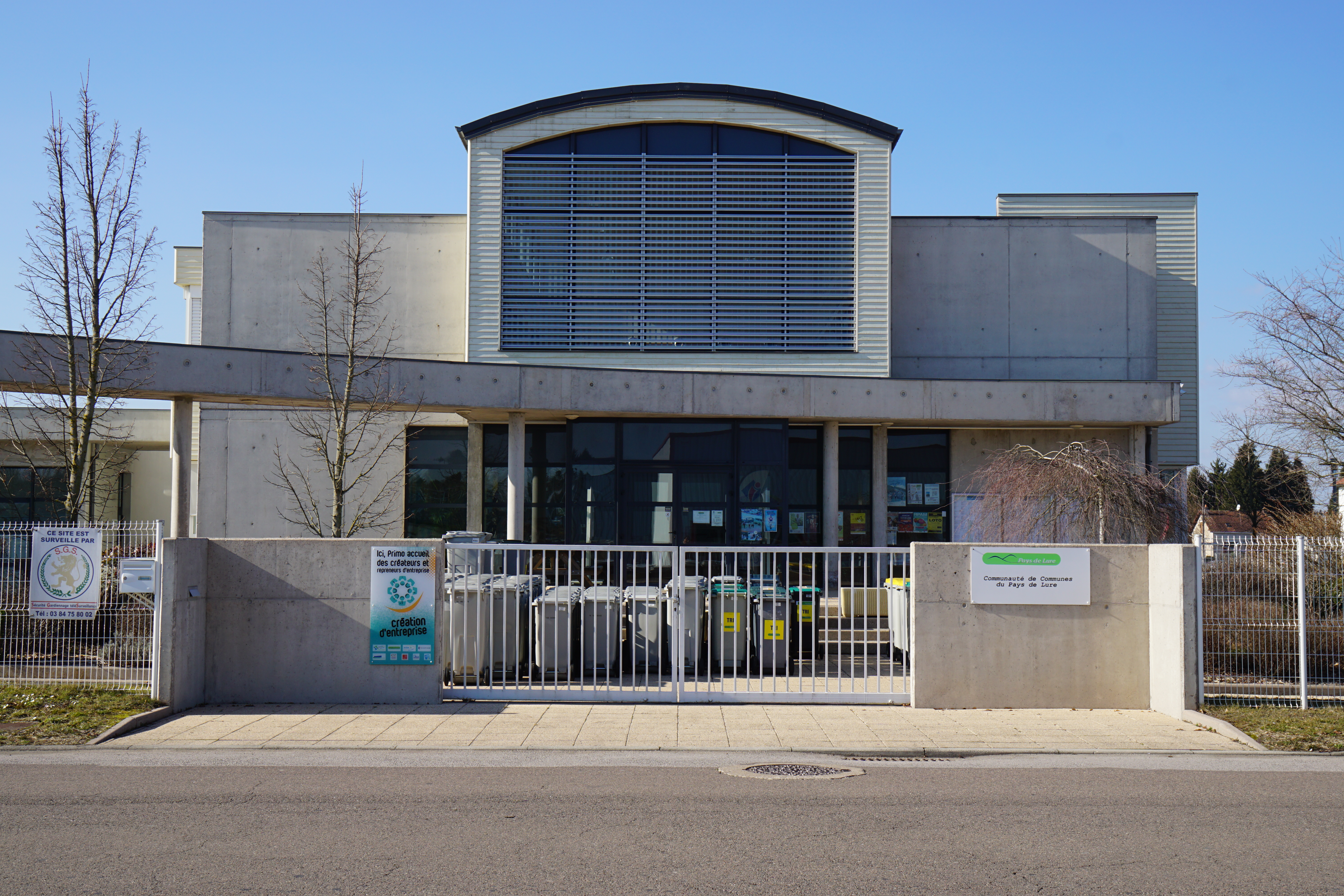
Intercommunal head office.

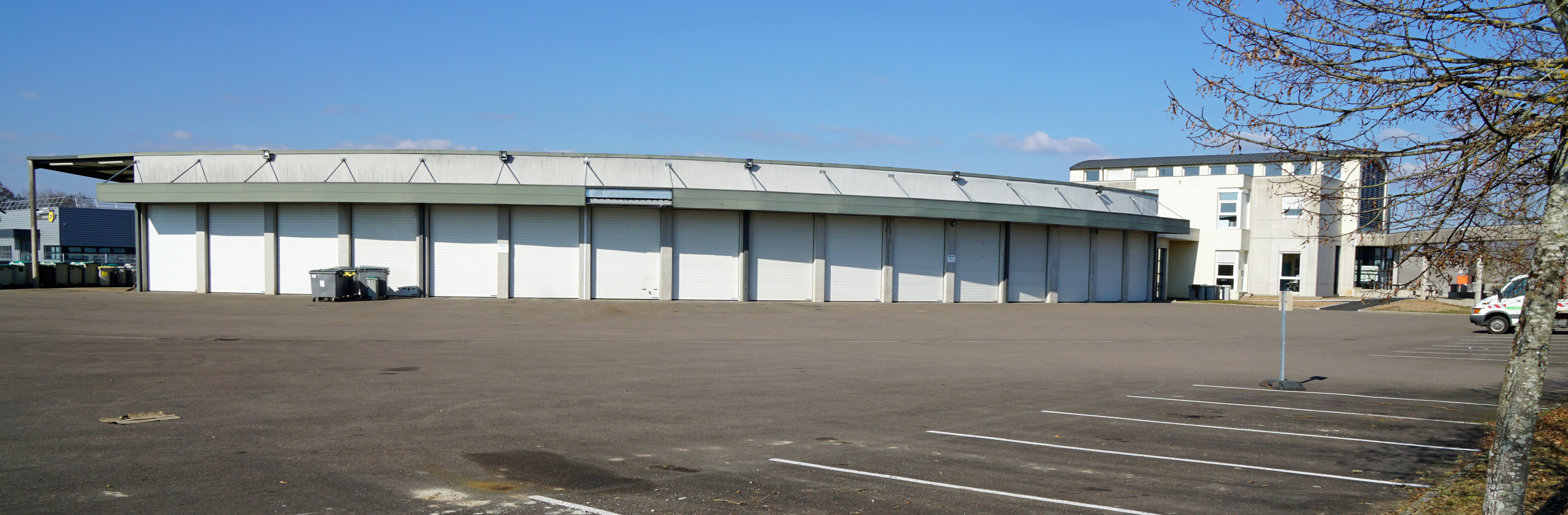
General view of the head office and technical facilities of the Communauté de Communes du pays de Lure.

=== Elected representatives ===
For the 2020-2026 term of office, the Community of Communes is administered by a Community Council made up of 46 delegates representing each of the 24 member communes, distributed roughly according to their population size, i.e.:

- 18 delegates for Lure;
- 3 delegates for Margny-Vernois, Roye;
- 2 delegates for Saint-Germain;
- 1 delegate and alternate for the other villages.

Following the 2020 municipal elections in Haute-Saône, the renewed community bureau on July 16, 2021, elected its new president, Isabelle Arnould, first deputy mayor of Lure, and its 12 vice-presidents, who are

1. Bernard Piquard, Mayor of Roye, in charge of economic development ;
2. Agnès Galmiche, municipal councillor of Lure, responsible for children;
3. Bernard Richard, mayor of Magny-Danigon, in charge of roads and digital technology;
4. Sophie Romary-Grosjean, Lure town councillor, in charge of culture, cinema, and the music school;
5. Jean-Christophe Ballot, mayor of Magny-Jobert, in charge of waste management;
6. Maryline Caravati-Bresson, mayor of Saint-Germain, in charge of the regional project and cooperation with local authorities;
7. Joël Hacquard, municipal councillor of Lure, in charge of water, sanitation, GEMAPI, DECI, and AAGV.
8. Michel Daguenet, mayor of Palante, in charge of urban planning and housing;
9. Laurence Hertz-Ninnoli, municipal councillor of Lure, in charge of tourism, communication and regional appeal.
10. Daniel Nourry, deputy mayor of Magny-Vernois, in charge of ecological transition and mobility;
11. Antoinette Marchal, mayor of Genevreuille, in charge of integration and development of healthcare services;
12. Michel Wende, municipal councillor of Lure, in charge of leisure, well-being, and the swimming pool.

=== List of chairmen ===
Period		Identity	Label	Quality
Missing data must be completed.
January 1999	April 2014	Jean Rota	Miscellaneous left (Divers gauche, DVG)	Mayor of Roye (1997 → 2014)
April 2014	July 2020	Robert Morlot	DVG	Retired PSA workshop manager Mayor of Frotey-lès-Lure (1989 → 2020) General Councillor for Lure-Sud (1994 → 2015) Departmental councilor for Lure-2 (2015 → 2021) Delegate Chairman of SDIS - 70 (2011 → 2021)
July 2020	In progress (as of April 6, 2021)	Isabelle Arnould	DVG	School teacher First deputy mayor of Lure (2014 → ) Departmental councillor for Lure-2 (2015 → ) Vice-President of the Haute-Saône departmental council (2015 → ) President of the École Départementale de Musique

=== Tax system and budget ===
The Communauté de communes is an inter-communal public body with its tax system. To finance the exercise of its powers, it levies a single business tax (FPU) — the successor to the single business tax (TPU) — and equalizes resources between residential communes and those with business parks.

It collects the household waste collection fee (REOM), which finances the operation of this service, and pays a community solidarity grant (DSC) to its member communes.

== Projects and achievements ==
In accordance with legal provisions, the purpose of a communauté de communes is to bring together “communes within an area of solidarity, with a view to drawing up a common development and spatial planning project”.
