= TFDC =

TFDC may refer to:

- Test Flight and Development Centre, a unit of the South African Air Force
- TACO Faurecia Design Center Pvt. Ltd., an engineering joint venture between Faurecia and Tata AutoComp Systems Limited (TACO)
