= Robert Peugeot =

French businessman

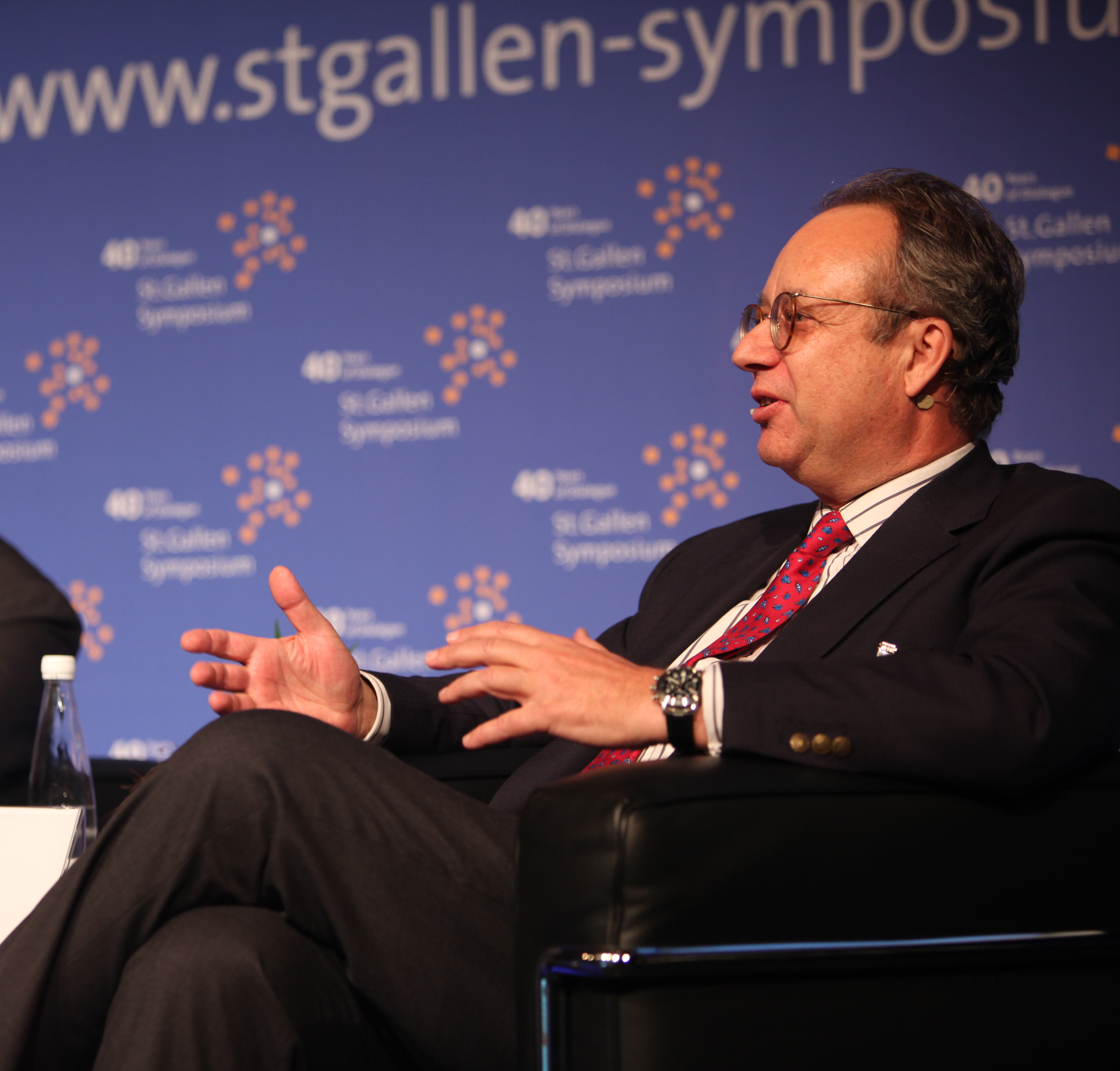
- Born: Robert Peugeot; 25 April 1950 (age 76); Belfort, France
- Education: École centrale Paris; INSEAD
- Occupations: Stellantis (vice-chairman); Peugeot Invest (CEO); Safran (member of the board)
- Parent: Bertrand Peugeot

Robert Peugeot (French pronunciation: [ʁɔbɛʁ pøʒo]; born 25 April 1950) is a French businessman. He is chairman of Peugeot Invest, the listed investment company that is one of the two main shareholders in Stellantis and majority-owned by Établissements Peugeot Frères (Peugeot Brothers).

Part of a long family line, he is the son of Bertrand Peugeot, long-time director of Cycles Peugeot and one of the people behind the creation of the PSA Peugeot Citroën Group in 1976, and the great-grandson of Robert I Peugeot and grandson of Eugène II Peugeot.

== Early life and family ==
After completing his primary and secondary education at the Lycée Cuvier in Montbéliard and then at Janson-de-Sailly in Paris, Robert Peugeot was accepted at the École Centrale Paris and obtained his Diplôme d'Ingénieur (the engineering degree in France) in 1971, which he completed at INSEAD in 1973.

Keen to gain real hands-on experience within the carmaker, he joined the Sochaux vehicle manufacturing plant in 1974 as a worker and then team leader on the assembly lines.

== Career ==
=== Operational positions ===
He subsequently held a succession of operational positions within the automotive group:

- Head of Peugeot-Citroën's planning department in Johannesburg (South Africa) (1975–76).
- Design and development engineer at Peugeot (1977–78). In particular, he worked on the development and fine-tuning of on-board air conditioning systems for new vehicles.
- Central bodywork methods engineer at Citroën (1979–81). During this period, he developed the robotisation of bodywork welding workshops.
- Director of the Citroën mechanical engineering plant in Asnières (1981–82). During the major industrial disputes of 1982, Robert Peugeot maintained production at the Asnières plant, which supplied all Citroën assembly plants, throughout the conflict.
- Director of Peugeot-Talbot Motor Company in Coventry (UK) (1983–84). He successfully organised the launch of Peugeot's '205' model in the network, most of which came from Talbot, and the investment in the '309' model, which ensured the continued existence of the Ryton plant.
- From 1985 to 1998, he held a succession of management positions at Citroën: head of plans and programmes (1985–88), then director of organisation and IT systems (1988–93), and finally director of quality and organisation (1993–98).

=== Chairman of the family investment company ===
In February 2002, Robert Peugeot was appointed chairman and chief executive officer of FFP, a listed investment company and Peugeot SA's largest shareholder (22.1%). At the time, FFP's core assets were PSA Peugeot Citroën shares.

At the helm of FFP, Robert Peugeot says he favours investing in companies in which his company can 'contribute its expertise in the management of family groups, with active collaboration from FFP representatives in the decision-making and development of companies in which FFP has taken a share of the capital'.

In 2007, Robert Peugeot decided to leave the executive committee of PSA Peugeot Citroën to join the supervisory board of PSA Peugeot Citroën and, given the growth achieved by FFP, to manage the company on a full-time basis. Since 2002, the value of FFP's assets has risen sharply. At 31 December 2019, despite two years of financial crisis, net asset value stood at more than €3.5 billion.

On 15 July 2015, the French magazine Le Point published an article reporting on the top-hat pension of over €450,000 received by Robert Peugeot from PSA.

On 19 May 2020, Robert Peugeot was appointed chairman of FFP, leaving the position of chief executive officer of FFP to Bertrand Finet. FFP became Peugeot Invest in 2021.

== Other functions and corporate offices ==
- Member of the executive committee of PSA Peugeot Citroën (1998–2007)
- Member of the supervisory board of PSA Peugeot Citroën (since 2007) and chairman of the strategic committee of PSA Peugeot Citroën
- Member of the board of directors of Forvia
- Member of the board of directors of Safran
- Member of the board of directors of Stellantis
