= Peugeot Invest =

Investment company incorporated in France

Peugeot Invest S.A.

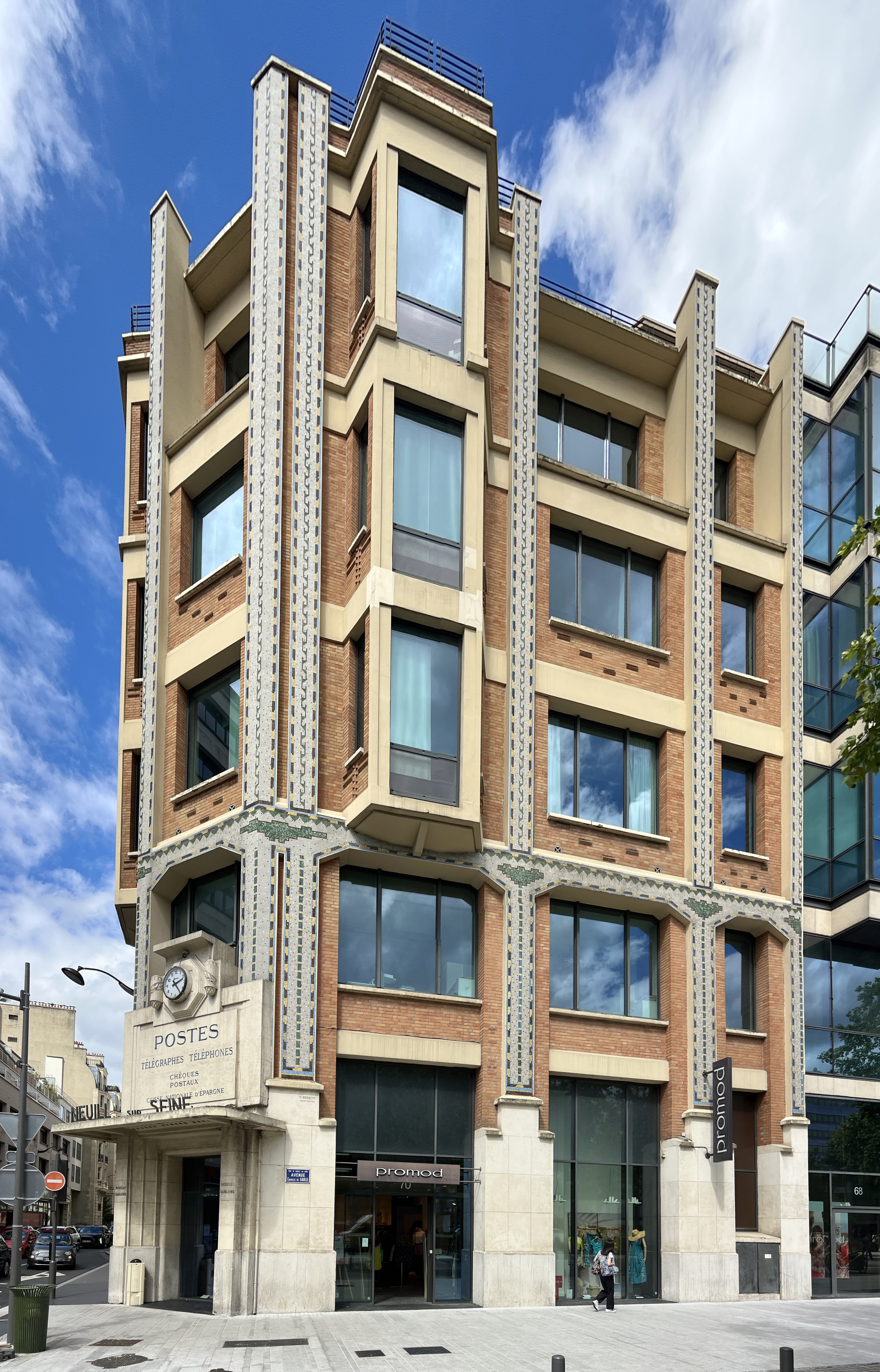
- Peugeot Invest's headquarters in Neuilly-sur-Seine
- Formerly: Société Foncière Financière et de Participations, then FFP
- Company type: Public
- Traded as: Euronext Paris: PEUG; CAC Small
- Industry: Investment
- Founded: 1929
- Headquarters: Neuilly-sur-Seine, France
- Key people: Robert Peugeot (CEO)
- Owner: Peugeot family (through Établissements Peugeot Frères S.A.)
- Parent: Établissements Peugeot Frères S.A.
- Website: peugeot-invest.com

Peugeot Invest S.A. is the listed holding company of the Peugeot family.

It is incorporated in France, listed on Euronext Paris, and controlled through the privately held company Établissements Peugeot Frères S.A., which represents the interests of the Peugeot family. Peugeot Invest was founded in 1929 as the Société Foncière Financière et de Participations, later renamed FFP.

== History ==
=== Founding and growth ===
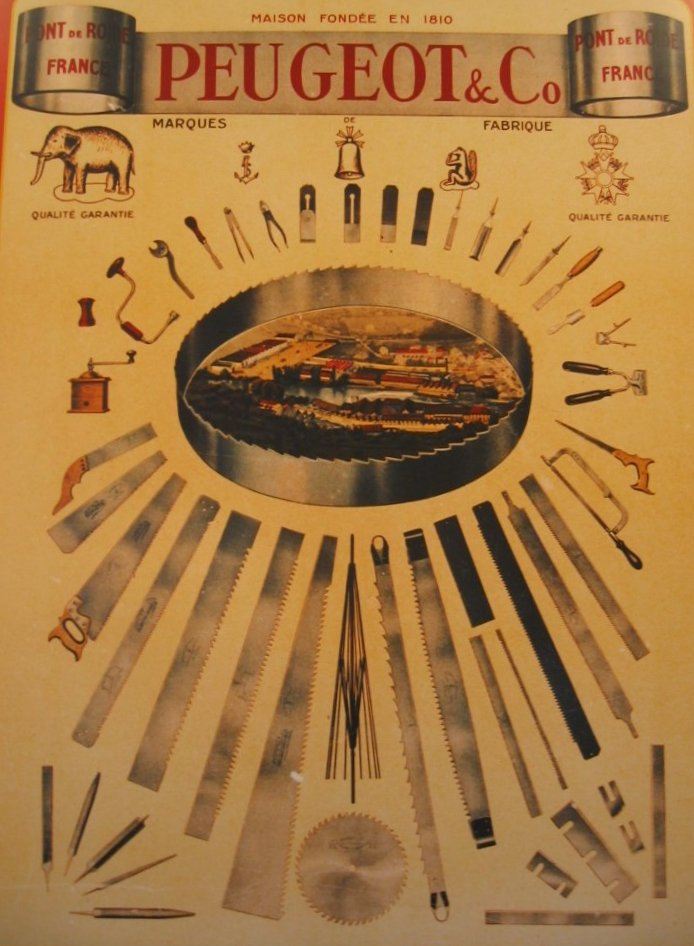
Tool production at Peugeot & Cie.

In 1929 the company was created by the Peugeot family as a family investment company, the Société Foncière Financière et de Participations. From the outset, the company built on the legacy of the Peugeot brothers, who founded the Peugeot automobile manufacturer in 1810. The Peugeot family is one of the historic shareholders of Stellantis (and previously of PSA Group). Drawing on its industrial experience, the company has developed an investment activity in diversified assets, consisting mainly of direct minority holdings, private equity vehicles, co-investments and real estate.

In 1966 the family group companies were reorganised, with FFP becoming the main shareholder in Peugeot SA.

In 1989 the company was listed on the Nancy Stock Exchange. For several years, it remained focused on its stake in PSA Peugeot Citroën. By the early 2000s, it had only €200m of assets outside the automobile manufacturer.

In 2002 Robert Peugeot (1950–), great-grandson and namesake of the founder of the PSA Group, took over as head of the FFP family investment company and began an ambitious diversification strategy. Since then, it has diversified considerably under his leadership, leading the holding company to take long-term minority stakes in groups such as SEB, Taittinger, Lisi, Zodiac Aerospace and Sanef.

=== Restructuring as Peugeot Invest ===
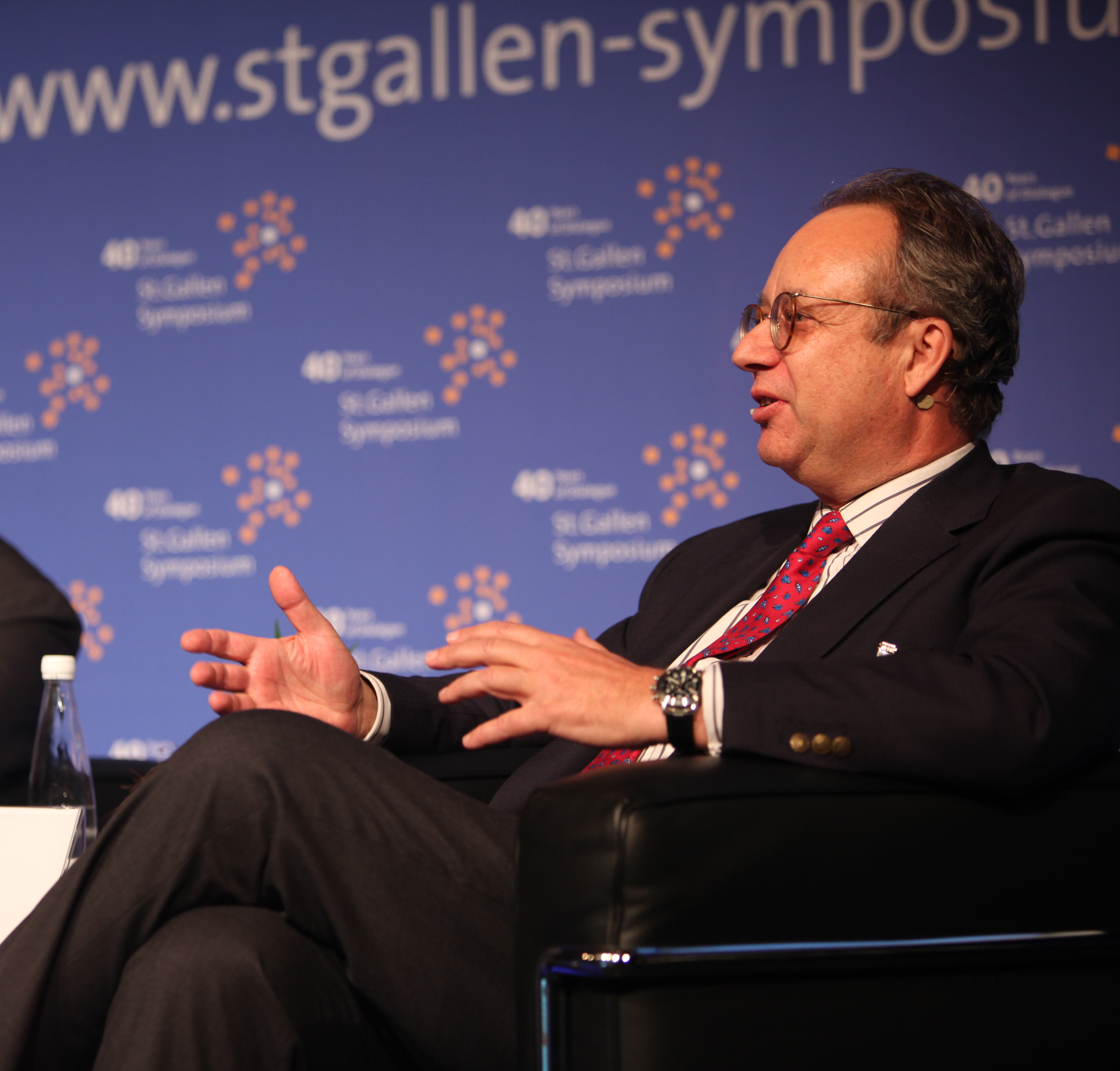
Robert Peugeot, CEO of Peugeot Invest.

In May 2020 Bertrand Finet was appointed managing director of Peugeot Invest, continuing the diversification strategy led by Robert Peugeot. In March 2023, FFP announced a change in its general management and the departure of Bertrand Finet. In September 2020, FFP and Établissements Peugeot Frères transferred all their shares in the PSA Group to their joint subsidiary "Maillot I", which in February 2021 became "Peugeot 1810", 76.5%-owned by the FFP and 23.5%-owned by Établissements Peugeot Frères. This subsidiary then owns 7.2% of Stellantis, which was created by the merger between PSA Group and Fiat Chrysler Automobiles in January 2021.

On 22 February 2021 FFP announced its name change to "Peugeot Invest". At 31 December 2021, 80% of Peugeot Invest's capital was held by the Peugeot family through Établissements Peugeot Frères, with 20% corresponding to free float. The net asset value was €5.9 billion. Today, the company is listed on Compartment A of Euronext Paris and remains 80% owned by family members, via Établissements Peugeot Frères.

In 2023 the company invested in the Anglo-French investment bank Rothschild & Co, and sold its stake in Groupe SEB the following year.

== Companies ==
Peugeot Invest's portfolio consists mainly of companies in which it is a minority shareholder capable of supporting the development of its investments over the long term.

=== Public companies ===
- Stellantis: 7.4% (11.5% voting rights)
- Forvia: 3.1%
- LISI: 10.3%
- Immobilière Dassault: 19.8%
- SPIE: 5.1%
- Ciel: 6.8%
- Robertet Group: 7.1%

=== Private companies ===
- International SOS: 14.6%
- Rothschild & Co: 5.1%
- Acteon
- Signa
- Château Guiraud

== Investments ==
=== Peugeot 1810 ===
==== Stellantis ====
Through a joint subsidiary called "Peugeot 1810", formerly "Maillot I", Peugeot Invest and Établissements Peugeot Frères own 7.2% of Stellantis.

Prior to the merger of PSA Group with Fiat Chrysler Automobiles, its main asset (28% at 30 June 2020) was a 9% stake in the capital of PSA (the family held around 13% of the capital through various channels). The remaining assets (72%) are part of a diversification strategy implemented since 2003, which consists of decorrelating the Peugeot Invest portfolio by investing in a variety of sectors and geographical areas.

==== Forvia ====
When PSA merged with Fiat Chrysler Automobiles, Stellantis' stake in Faurecia (now Forvia) was reduced from 46.3% to 39% and then redistributed to its own shareholders at the beginning of 2021. Peugeot 1810 held 3.14% of the capital as at 27 March 2021.

=== Other investments ===
Robert Peugeot, Chairman of Peugeot Invest, said: ‘We prefer to invest in companies where we can bring our expertise in managing family groups.

- several listed French companies including Safran, Orpea (5.05%), Lisi, Tikehau Capital (2%), SPIE S.A. (5.46%) and Groupe SEB (5.01%),
- private equity funds,
- in long-term investments with JAB Holding Company or Lineage Logistics.

At the end of 2021, the whole package will be valued at 5.9 billion euros.

=== Peugeot Invest Assets ===
Peugeot Invest Assets, formerly FFP Invest, and a subsidiary of Peugeot Invest, has held a 19.8% stake in Immobilière Dassault since 2016, as at 31 December 2019.

== Shareholders ==
Peugeot Invest is 80%-owned by Établissements Peugeot Frères (an unlisted holding company representing the interests of the heirs to the Peugeot family). The remaining 20% is held on a floating basis. The company's board of directors is made up of representatives of Établissements Peugeot Frères and independent directors.

== Association with JAB Holding Company and Panera Bread ==
Peugeot Invest has co-invested alongside JAB Holding Company since 2017 as part of a long-term investment partnership. Through this relationship, Peugeot Invest is indirectly linked to several consumer brands within JAB’s portfolio, including the bakery-café chain Panera Bread.

In March 2024, Reuters reported that ahead of a planned initial public offering, Panera Bread revised several ingredient standards, including removing in-store signage referencing “No Antibiotics Ever” and “Grass-Fed Pasture-Raised” claims and permitting the use of certain antibiotics in pork and turkey production, citing projected cost savings.

Following these developments, some animal-welfare organizations criticized Panera’s supply-chain practices as falling short of the internationally recognized Five Freedoms framework for animal welfare. The advocacy organization Five Freedoms also drew attention to financial partners associated with Panera’s parent company, and their responsibility in the matter, including investors that co-invest with JAB Holding Company such as Peugeot Invest.
