= TACO Faurecia Design Center =

Engineering design company

- Company type: Private Limited
- Industry: Automotive
- Founded: 2004
- Defunct: 30 November 2009
- Fate: Taken over
- Successor: Faurecia
- Headquarters: Pune, India
- Key people: Franck Euvrard, CEO
- Services: Design Center for Faurecia
- Revenue: ?
- Number of employees: 315+
- Parent: Tata AutoComp Systems Limited, Faurecia Industrie

TACO Faurecia Design Center Pvt. Ltd. (TFDC) was an Indo French engineering design company. It was a 50:50 joint venture between Tata AutoComp Systems Limited (TACO) of India and Faurecia Automotive Holdings of France. It provided automotive components design services exclusively to Faurecia.

The company designed and developed seating systems, dashboards, car doors, bumpers and other components for Faurecia's clients, which include BMW, Mercedes-Benz, Ford Motor Company, General Motors, Peugeot Citroën, Renault Nissan, Toyota, the Volkswagen group, Chrysler and Hyundai-Kia.

== Takeover by Faurecia ==
On 1 December 2009, Faurecia purchased the 50% stake of Tata in TFDC. As a result, TFDC became a part of Faurecia. The price of Faurecia's shares at the Euronext Paris rose by around 4.5% in the wake of this news.

== Parent Companies ==
=== Tata AutoComp Systems Limited (TACO) ===
The TACO group of companies was established by the Tata Group, which has several decades of experience in the automotive industry. The TACO group offers a range of products and services in the field of auto components to automotive vehicle manufacturers all over the world.

The TACO group has 24 manufacturing plants, 5 engineering centers and three export-oriented units, and it is rapidly expanding its business with vehicle manufacturers and Tier I suppliers to the automotive industry.

=== Faurecia Industrie, France ===
Headquartered in France, Faurecia is the second-largest automotive supplier in Europe and the ninth-largest in the world. Specializing in the design, production and assembly of a range of automotive component modules, the company is number one in Europe and number two worldwide in the cockpit and door segments. With 60,000 employees at 190 manufacturing sites and 28 R&D centers in 29 countries, it serves the world's leading automotive manufacturers, including BMW, DaimlerChrysler, Ford, GM, Peugeot, Renault, Toyota and Volkswagen.

The company specializes in the design, production and assembly of seats, cockpits, doors, exhaust systems, acoustics and front ends.
