= Law on the new territorial organization of the Republic =

French law

Law no. 2015-991 of August 7, 2015 on the new territorial organization of the Republic
- Territorial extent: France
- Enacted by: First and Second Valls government
- Enacted: 7 August 2015

Law no. 2015-991 of August 7, 2015, on the new territorial organization of the Republic, better known by its acronym Loi NOTRe, is a French law that forms part of Act III of decentralization, implemented during the presidency of François Hollande. The law primarily aims to strengthen the powers of regions and public establishments for inter-municipal cooperation.

== Contents of the bill ==
=== Strengthened regional powers ===
The law strengthened the powers of the regions through several measures, including transfers of powers from the départements, an increase in certain competencies, and an expansion of executive powers. Key provisions include the transfer of:

- Departmental roads on January 1, 2017. It was proposed that the words “routes départementales” be replaced by the words “routes régionales” (Article 9, I., 1° of the initial draft), but this proposal was rejected during the discussion that followed the vote on the first reading by the National Assembly on March 10, 2015.
- Collèges (buildings, service technicians and workers, and sectorization) and the day-school fixed price as of September 1, 2017 (Article 12).
- Intercity and school transport, respectively on January 1, 2017, and September 1, 2017 (Article 15).
- Departmental ports, which may also be transferred to the local authorities following an invitation to tender (Article 11).
- All waste sector planning - prevention and management of non-hazardous waste and waste from the construction industry, which were departmental responsibilities before the reform (Article 5).

However, following the first reading by the two assemblies, the transfer of secondary schools and departmental roads was no longer envisaged, nor was social action.

Regarding economic development, the region would be responsible for drawing up a regional plan for economic development, innovation, and internationalization (SRDEII), which would have prescriptive value and define business support schemes. The other levels of local government would also be able to intervene, but only with the agreement of the region, or directly in cases specifically provided for by law. The départements would therefore no longer be able to intervene in this field, with certain exceptions such as loan guarantees for low-income housing organizations. These provisions would come into force on January 1, 2016 (Articles 2 and 3).

In the field of planning and sustainable development, the region would draw up a regional plan for planning, sustainable development, and territorial equality (SRADDET), which would have prescriptive value with regard to urban planning documents, such as the General Urban Ordinance Plan, and would replace existing plans in these fields (Articles 6 and 7).

In the field of tourism, which remains a competence shared between local authorities, the regions would be the lead agencies. They would draw up a regional tourism development plan, which would not be prescriptive in nature. These new provisions would come into force on January 1, 2016 (Article 4).

=== Reduced powers for départements ===
With intercity and school transport (excluding transport for disabled users) and departmental ports transferred to the regions, the role of the départements will be refocused on territorial and social solidarity.

The département would thus be able to implement any aid or action relating to the prevention or management of situations of fragility, social development, the care of young children, and personal autonomy. It would also be responsible for facilitating access to rights and services for the populations for which it is responsible.

It could provide financial support to communes, groups of communes, or établissement public de coopération intercommunale as part of their territorial projects. It could also contribute to the financing of investment operations in favor of commercial service companies required to meet the needs of the population in rural areas, for which the project is managed by communes or EPCIs for reasons of territorial solidarity and when private initiative is lacking or absent.

The law also provides for the transfer to metropolises of certain responsibilities in the social field, such as social assistance and tourism.

=== Transfer of certain State powers ===
The law outlined the process for transferring specific state responsibilities, such as airports, to local authorities upon request. However, the state would retain control of key airfields essential for regional air services, international flights, and strategic interests, especially in French overseas departments. The airfields of Dijon - after the planned withdrawal of military activities - Montpellier, Nîmes, or Strasbourg, could thus be transferred.

=== New intercommunal map ===
As of January 1, 2017, intercommunalities must have at least 15,000 inhabitants, compared with 5,000 in 2014.

In response to the President's announcement, the Association de Intercommunalités de France points out that 1,507 communities out of the 2,145 existing public establishments for intercommunal cooperation - i.e. almost three-quarters of them - do not meet this threshold and would therefore have to change their boundaries.

New, more precise criteria including proposed derogations were proposed during the first reading of the law on March 10, 2015. The application of these criteria reduces the number of inter-communal cooperation establishments concerned by a possible grouping. However, more than half remain concerned, with strong regional disparities, as shown on the map produced by EDATER.

=== Staff transfers ===
The text of the bill sets out the terms and conditions for the provision or transfer of State services or parts of services in charge of transferred competencies. Employees of the départements who participate in the exercise of powers transferred to the regions (or possibly, in the case of seaports and inland ports, to another local authority or grouping) will change employer without changing civil service or statutory framework. The text also reinforces employees' rights to supplementary social protection when they are transferred.

=== Rewriting points of the MAPTAM law ===
In response to requests from local elected representatives, amendments to the bill rewrote the provisions of the Loi de modernisation de l'action publique territoriale et d'affirmation des métropoles concerning the Greater Paris metropolis and the Aix-Marseille-Provence metropolis.

=== Corsica's status ===
The merger of the two Corsican départements was first rejected by a referendum in 2003. Following a proposal by the Corsican assembly, supported by the government, the territorial collectivity of Corsica and the departmental councils of Haute-Corse and Corse-du-Sud were merged to form the collectivity of Corsica; since January 1, 2018, the powers of the president of the executive council of Corsica, in particular, have been extended.

== Related bill ==
=== Procedure for subsequent modification of the regional map ===
Law no. 2015-29 of January 16, 2015, on the delimitation of regions provided for the possibility, between 2016 and 2019, for a département to change region after obtaining the approval of the 2 regional councils concerned as well as the département council by a 3/5ths majority.

== Legislative chronology ==
Bill of law	Discussion stages	First reading				Second reading		Joint Committee	Further reading		Constitutional Council	Chairman
Bill of law	Discussion stages	Senate			Assembly	Senate	Assembly	Assembly + Senate	Senate	Assembly	Constitutional Council	Chairman
Bill of law	Discussion stages	Submission		Vote	Vote	Vote	Vote	Result	Vote	Vote	Review	Promulgation
Bill on the new territorial organization of the Republic	Senate website, National Assembly website	June 18, 2014		January 27, 2015	March 10, 2015	Juin 2, 2015	July 2, 2015	July 9, 2015	July 16, 2015	July 16, 2015	August 6, 2015	August 7, 2015
Bill on the new territorial organization of the Republic	Senate website, National Assembly website	[archive]	[archive]	[archive]	[archive]	[archive]	[archive]	archive	[archive]	[archive]	[archive]	[archive]

== See also ==
- Decentralisation in France

== Bibliography ==
- Valls, Manuel; Lebranchu, Marylise; Vallini, André (2014). Projet de loi portant nouvelle organisation territoriale de la République (PDF) (in French). Sénat.
