= Amblans-et-Velotte =

- Commune
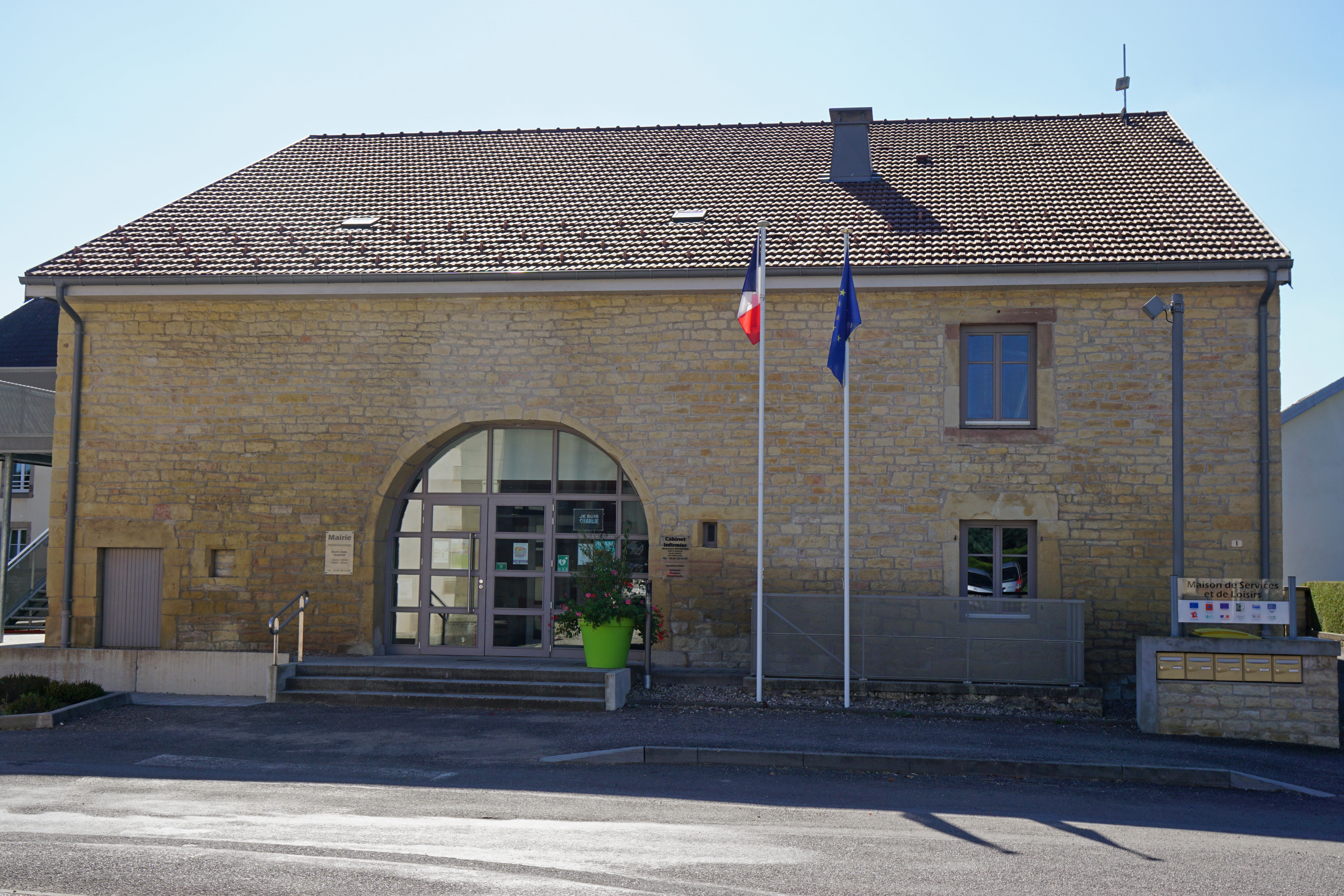
- The town hall in Amblans-et-Velotte

- Coat of arms
- Location of Amblans-et-Velotte
- Location within France Location within Bourgogne-Franche-Comté
- Coordinates: 47°40′45″N 6°24′41″E
- Country: France
- Region: Bourgogne-Franche-Comté
- Department: Haute-Saône
- Arrondissement: Lure
- Canton: Lure-2
- Intercommunality: Pays de Lure

Government
  - Mayor (2023–2026): Laurent Chene
- Area^{1}: 9.76 km^{2} (3.77 sq mi)
- Highest elevation: 406 m (1,332 ft)
- Lowest elevation: 287 m (942 ft)
- Population (2023): 386
  - Density: 39.5/km^{2} (102/sq mi)
- Time zone: UTC+01:00 (CET)
  - Summer (DST): UTC+02:00 (CEST)
- INSEE/Postal code: 70014 /70200
- ^{1} French Land Register data, which excludes lakes, ponds, glaciers > 1 km^{2} (0.386 sq mi or 247 acres) and river estuaries.

Amblans-et-Velotte is a commune in the Haute-Saône department in the region of Bourgogne-Franche-Comté in eastern France.

== See also ==
- Communes of the Haute-Saône department
