= Arpenans =

- Commune
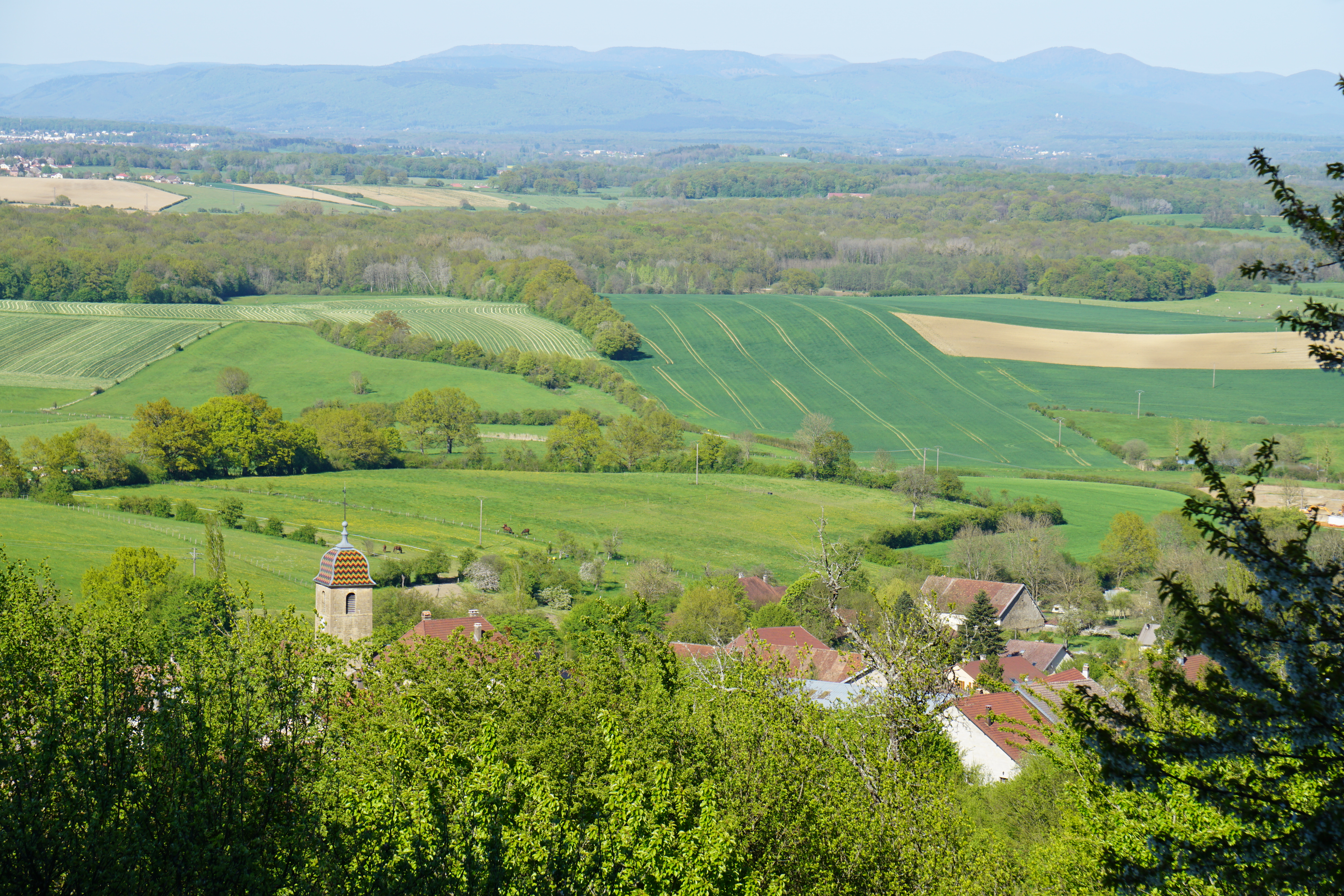
- A general view of Arpenans

- Coat of arms
- Location of Arpenans
- Location within France Location within Bourgogne-Franche-Comté
- Coordinates: 47°37′01″N 6°24′15″E
- Country: France
- Region: Bourgogne-Franche-Comté
- Department: Haute-Saône
- Arrondissement: Lure
- Canton: Lure-2
- Intercommunality: CC Pays de Lure

Government
  - Mayor (2020–2026): Élisabeth Sieger
- Area^{1}: 11.80 km^{2} (4.56 sq mi)
- Highest elevation: 416 m (1,365 ft)
- Lowest elevation: 271 m (889 ft)
- Population (2023): 245
  - Density: 20.8/km^{2} (53.8/sq mi)
- Time zone: UTC+01:00 (CET)
  - Summer (DST): UTC+02:00 (CEST)
- INSEE/Postal code: 70029 /70200
- ^{1} French Land Register data, which excludes lakes, ponds, glaciers > 1 km^{2} (0.386 sq mi or 247 acres) and river estuaries.

Arpenans (French pronunciation: [aʁpənɑ̃]) is a commune in the Haute-Saône department in the region of Bourgogne-Franche-Comté in eastern France. It lies 19 km away from Ronchamp Chapel and Vesoul.

== See also ==
- Communes of the Haute-Saône department
