= Saint-Germain, Haute-Saône =

Saint-Germain
- Commune
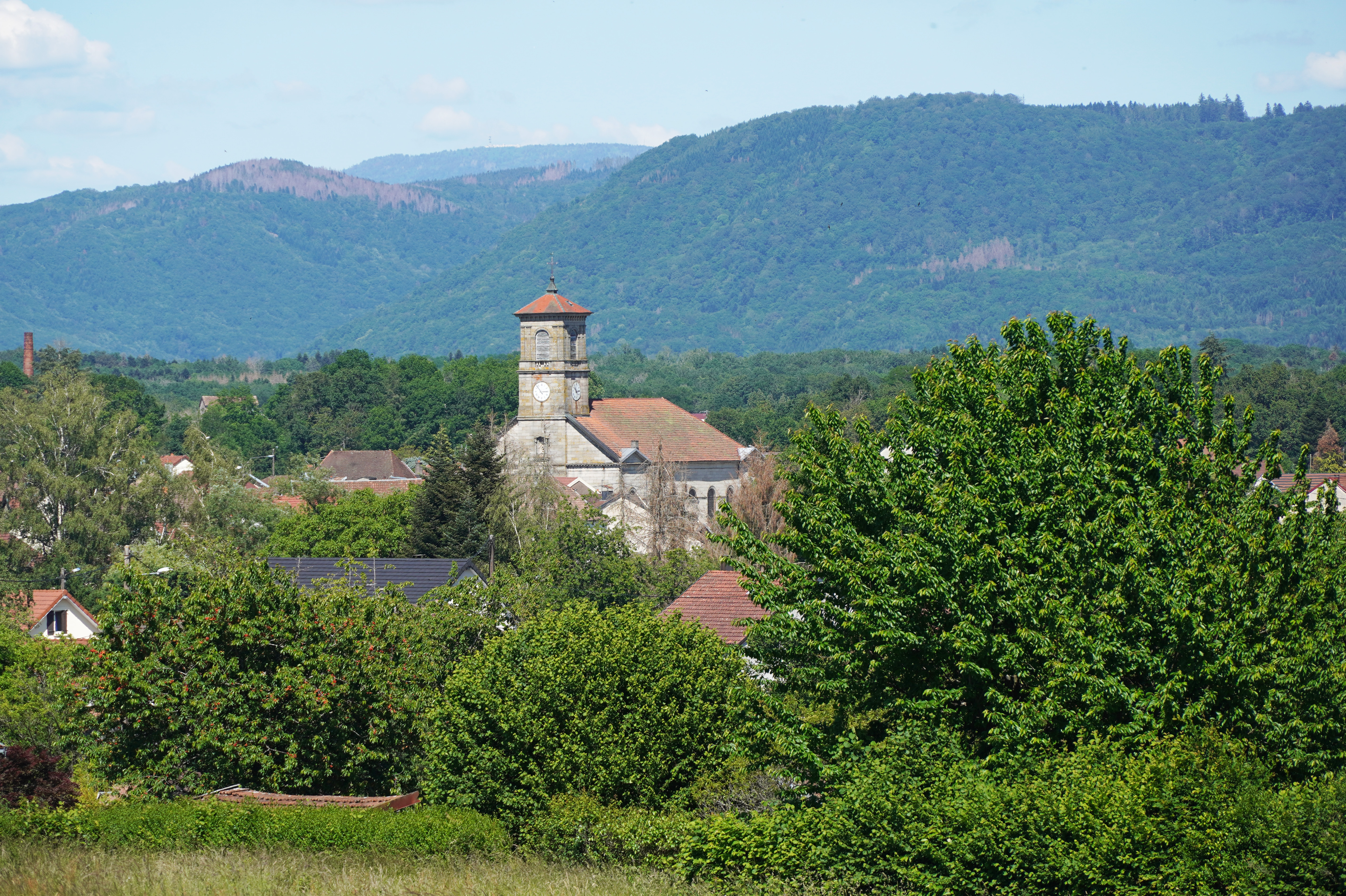
- The church and Vosges mountains
- Location of Saint-Germain
- Location within France Location within Bourgogne-Franche-Comté
- Coordinates: 47°43′22″N 6°31′53″E
- Country: France
- Region: Bourgogne-Franche-Comté
- Department: Haute-Saône
- Arrondissement: Lure
- Canton: Lure-1
- Area^{1}: 14.12 km^{2} (5.45 sq mi)
- Highest elevation: 357 m (1,171 ft)
- Lowest elevation: 302 m (991 ft)
- Population (2023): 1,377
  - Density: 97.52/km^{2} (252.6/sq mi)
- Time zone: UTC+01:00 (CET)
  - Summer (DST): UTC+02:00 (CEST)
- INSEE/Postal code: 70464 /70200
- ^{1} French Land Register data, which excludes lakes, ponds, glaciers > 1 km^{2} (0.386 sq mi or 247 acres) and river estuaries.

Saint-Germain is a commune in the Haute-Saône department in the region of Bourgogne-Franche-Comté in eastern France.

The town is mainly known for the Grande Pile bog which is a reference for the climatic history of Western Europe.

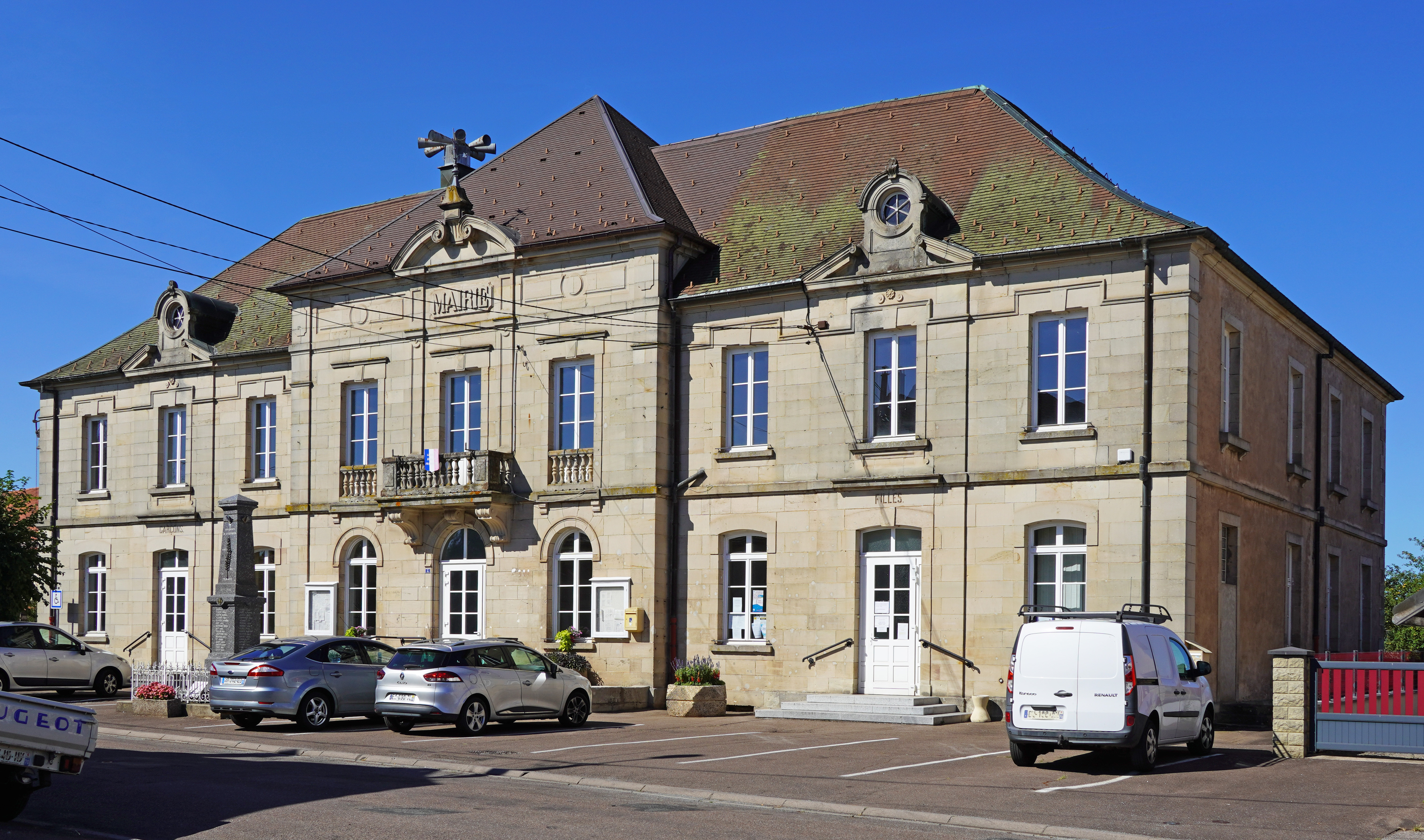
The town hall in Saint-Germain

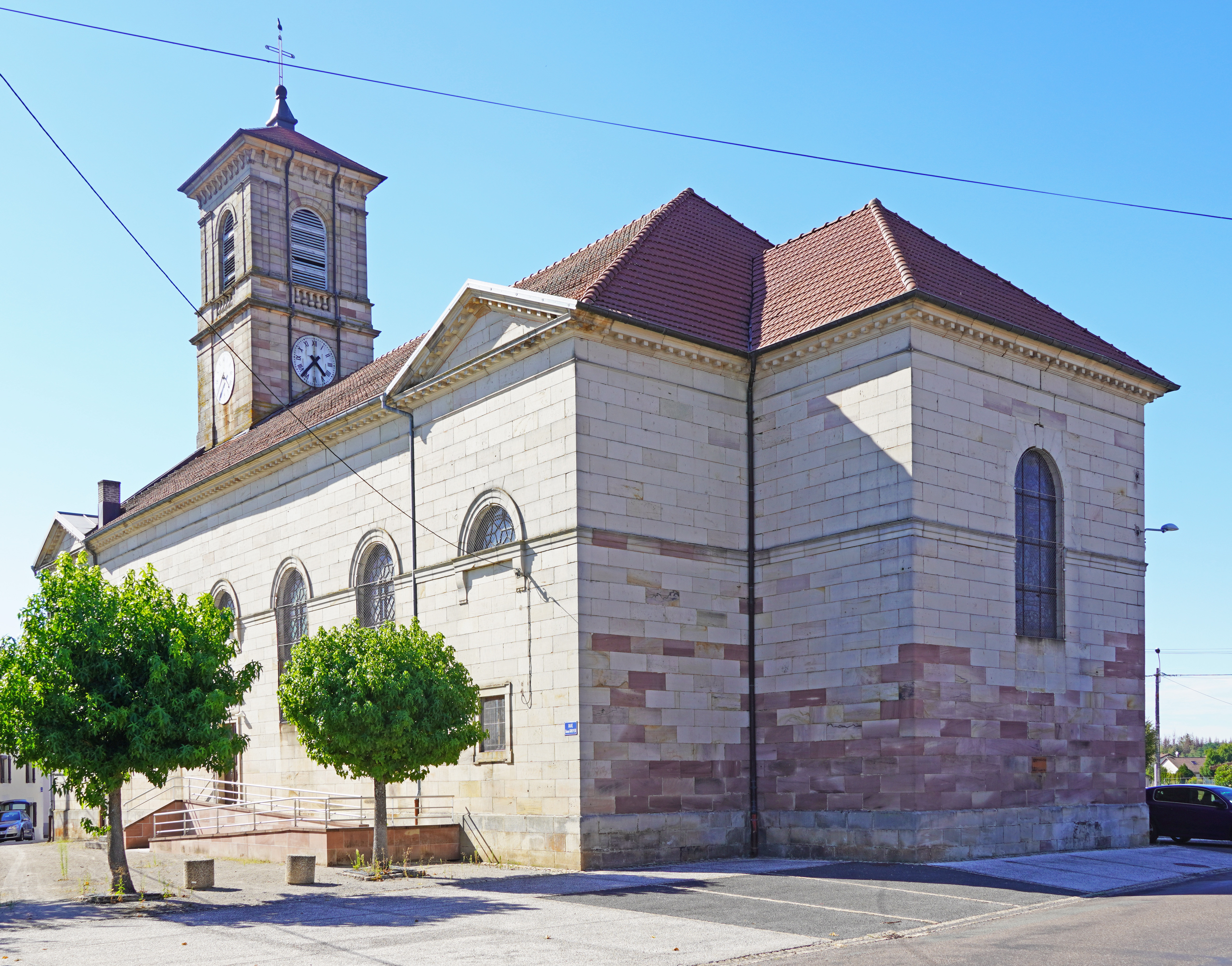
The Church

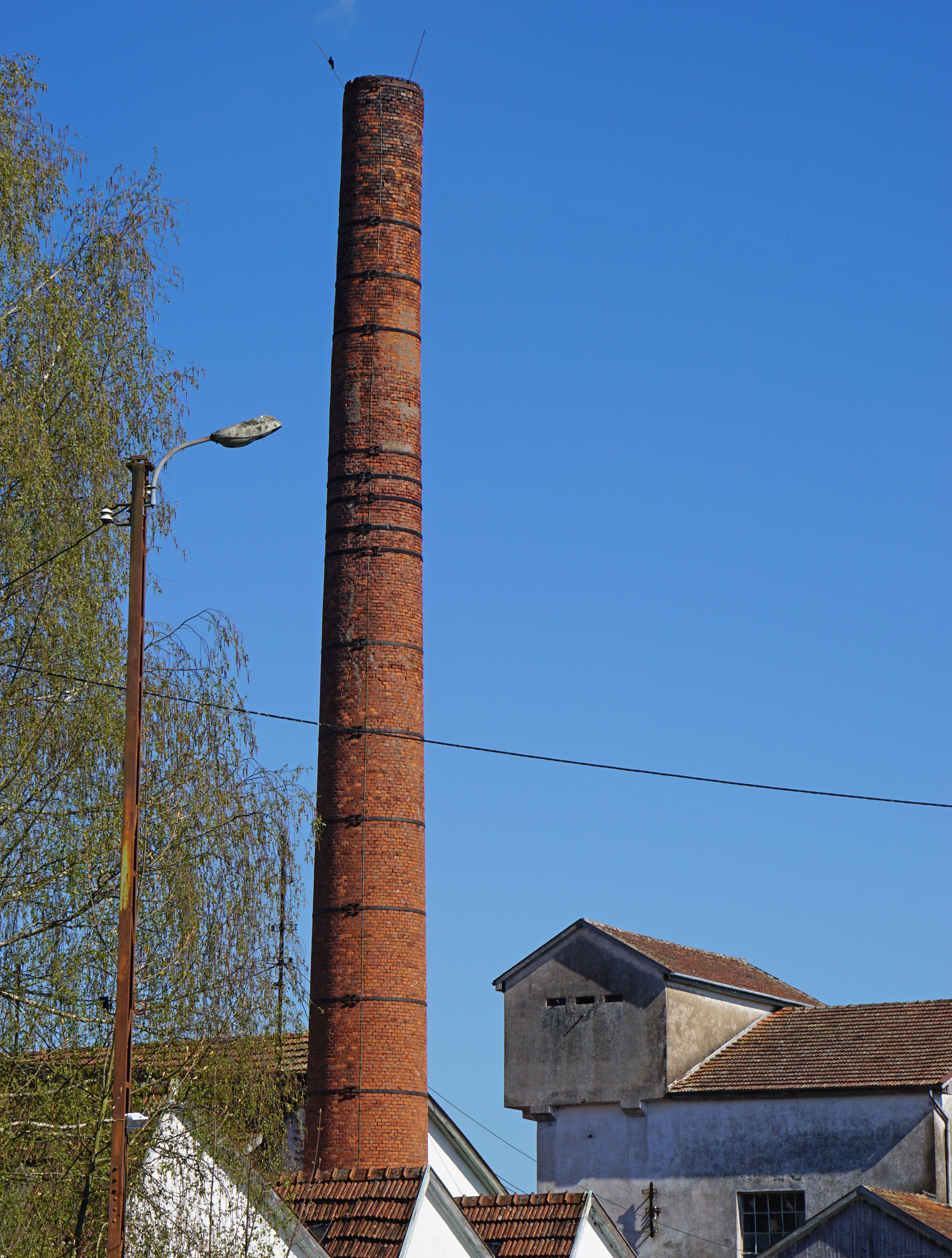
Old factory chimney

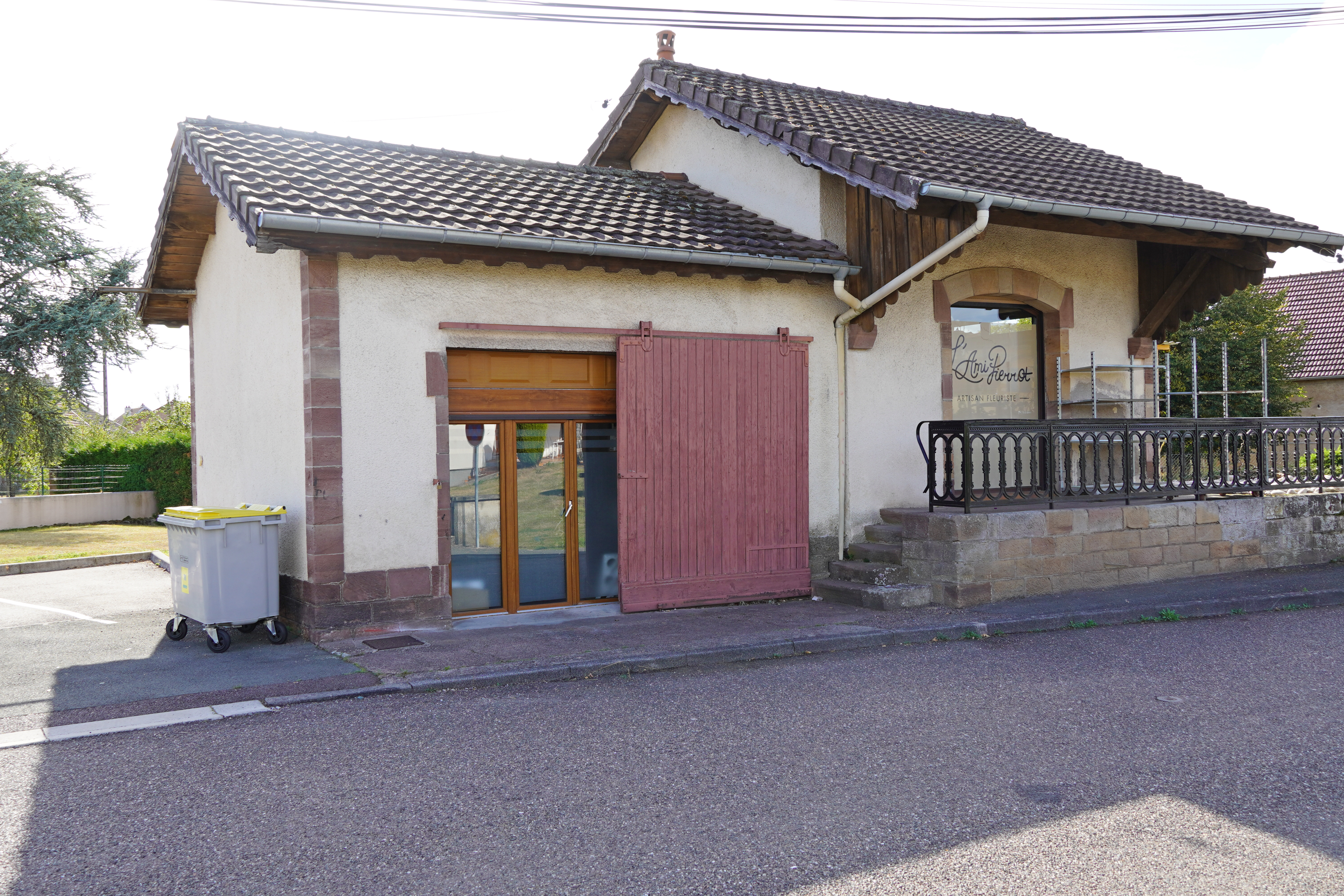
Old train station.

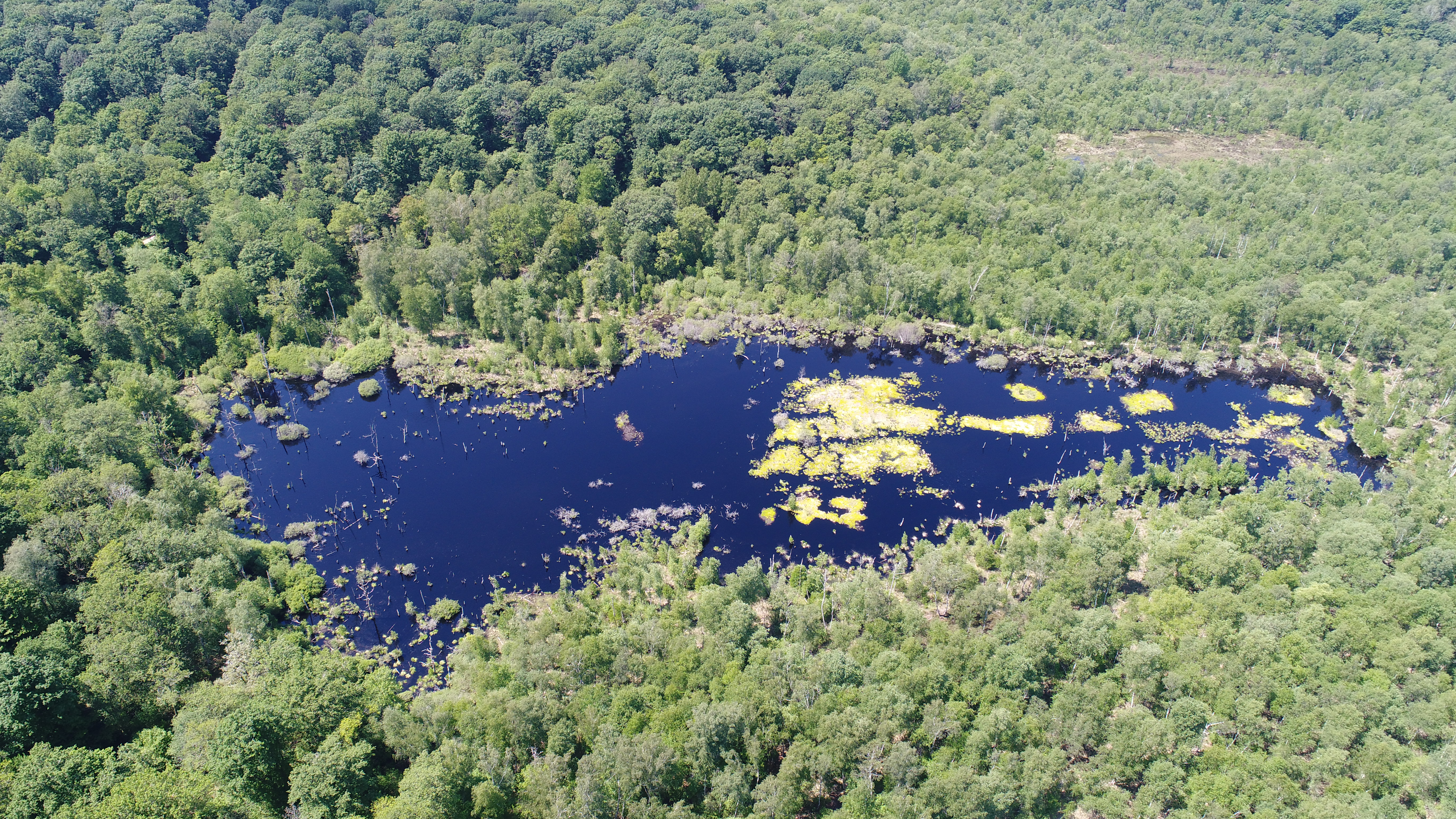
Bog : "Tourbière de la Grande Pile".

== See also ==
- Communes of the Haute-Saône department
