= Genevreuille =

- Commune
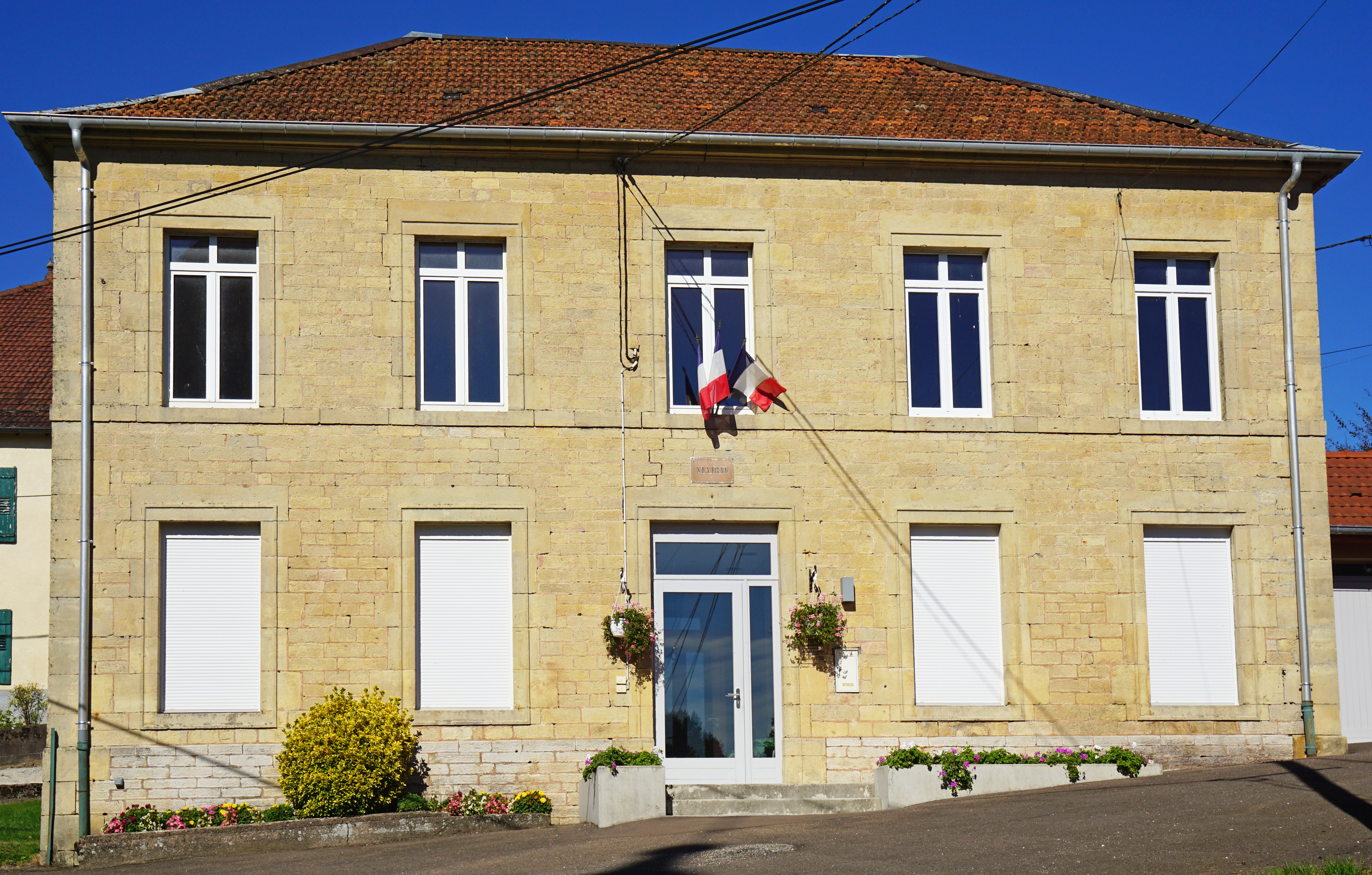
- The town hall in Genevreuille

- Coat of arms
- Location of Genevreuille
- Location within France Location within Bourgogne-Franche-Comté
- Coordinates: 47°40′15″N 6°22′43″E
- Country: France
- Region: Bourgogne-Franche-Comté
- Department: Haute-Saône
- Arrondissement: Lure
- Canton: Lure-2

Government
  - Mayor (2020–2026): Antoinette Marchal
- Area^{1}: 6.42 km^{2} (2.48 sq mi)
- Highest elevation: 411 m (1,348 ft)
- Lowest elevation: 291 m (955 ft)
- Population (2023): 148
  - Density: 23.1/km^{2} (59.7/sq mi)
- Time zone: UTC+01:00 (CET)
  - Summer (DST): UTC+02:00 (CEST)
- INSEE/Postal code: 70262 /70240
- ^{1} French Land Register data, which excludes lakes, ponds, glaciers > 1 km^{2} (0.386 sq mi or 247 acres) and river estuaries.

Genevreuille (French pronunciation: [ʒənvʁœj]) is a commune in the Haute-Saône department in the region of Bourgogne-Franche-Comté in eastern France.

== See also ==
- Communes of the Haute-Saône department
