= Magny-Vernois =

- Commune
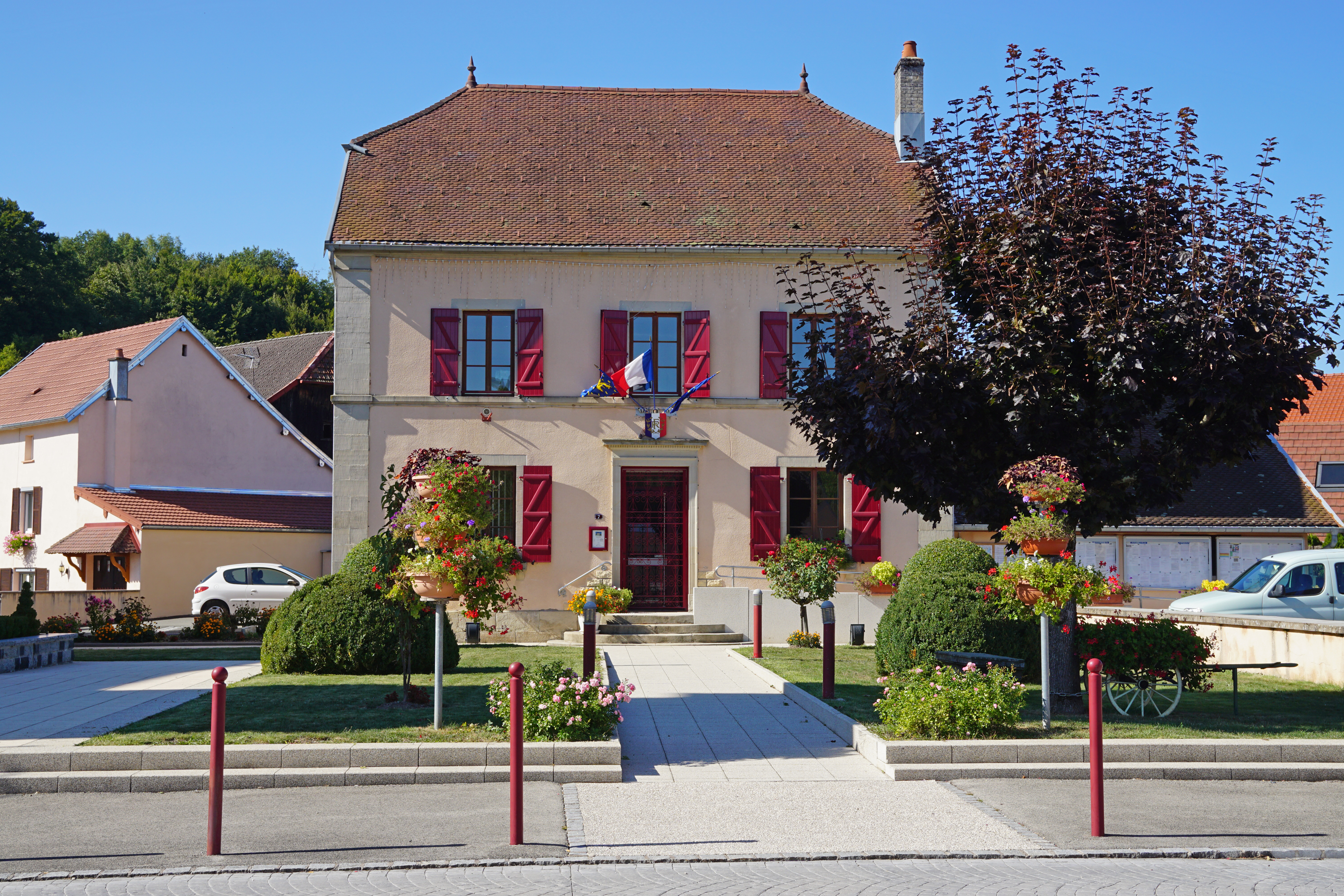
- The town hall in Magny-Vernois

- Coat of arms
- Location of Magny-Vernois
- Location within France Location within Bourgogne-Franche-Comté
- Coordinates: 47°40′10″N 6°28′30″E
- Country: France
- Region: Bourgogne-Franche-Comté
- Department: Haute-Saône
- Arrondissement: Lure
- Canton: Lure-2

Government
  - Mayor (2020–2026): Luc Ortega
- Area^{1}: 6.38 km^{2} (2.46 sq mi)
- Highest elevation: 312 m (1,024 ft)
- Lowest elevation: 282 m (925 ft)
- Population (2023): 1,372
  - Density: 215/km^{2} (557/sq mi)
- Time zone: UTC+01:00 (CET)
  - Summer (DST): UTC+02:00 (CEST)
- INSEE/Postal code: 70321 /70200
- ^{1} French Land Register data, which excludes lakes, ponds, glaciers > 1 km^{2} (0.386 sq mi or 247 acres) and river estuaries.

Magny-Vernois (French pronunciation: [maɲi vɛʁnwa]) is a commune in the Haute-Saône department in the region of Bourgogne-Franche-Comté in eastern France.

== See also ==
- Communes of the Haute-Saône department
