= Forvia =

French automotive components supplier

Forvia SE
- Formerly: Faurecia SE (until 2023)
- Type: Public (Societas Europaea)
- Traded as: Euronext Paris: FRVIA; CAC Mid 60
- ISIN: FR0000121147
- Industry: Automotive
- Founded: 1997
- Headquarters: Nanterre, France
- Number of locations: 35 countries
- Area served: International
- Key people: Martin Fischer, CEO
- Products: Automotive seating, interiors and emissions control technologies
- Services: Design and manufacture of automotive sub-systems for the Volkswagen Group, Stellantis, the Renault–Nissan–Mitsubishi Alliance, Ford, General Motors, BMW, Daimler, Toyota, Hyundai-Kia, BYD and other automotive OEMs
- Revenue: ▲€25,46 billion (2022)
- Operating income: ▲€1,11 billion (2022)
- Net income: ▼€-381,8 million (2022)
- Owners: Franklin Resources (8.99%); Exor (5.05%); Peugeot Invest (3.10%); Bpifrance (2.16%); Dongfeng Motor Hong Kong International (1.97%); BlackRock (3.83%)
- Number of employees: 157,460 (2022)
- Subsidiaries: Clarion; Hella (81.6%)
- Website: www.forvia.com

Forvia SE (stylized in all-uppercase), formerly Faurecia SE, is a French global automotive supplier headquartered in Nanterre, in the western suburbs of Paris. In 2022 it was the 7th largest international automotive parts manufacturer in the world and #1 for vehicle interiors and emission control technology. One in two automobiles is equipped by Forvia. It designs and manufactures seats, exhaust systems, interior systems (dashboards, centre consoles, door panels, acoustic modules) and decorative aspects of a vehicle (aluminium, wood).

Forvia's customers include the Volkswagen Group, Stellantis, Renault–Nissan–Mitsubishi, Ford, General Motors, BMW, Daimler, Toyota, Tesla, Inc., Hyundai-Kia, Jaguar Land Rover and BYD among others. More than 20% of the 2024 turnover were generated in China.

Forvia employs 8,300 engineers and technicians. The company operates over 300 production sites and 35 R&D centres in 37 countries worldwide, with 403 patents filed in 2017. About half of these sites are manufacturing plants operating on the just-in-time principle. Forvia (as Faurecia) joined the United Nations Global Compact in 2004.

== History ==
Faurecia was formed in 1998 after ECIA acquired Bertrand Faure. The two companies formally merged in June 1999, with PSA Peugeot Citroën as the majority shareholder. The purchase of Sommer Allibert's automotive business in 2001 added to Faurecia's vehicle interiors operations.

Chief executive Pierre Lévi resigned in August 2006 amid a bribery investigation. In June 2007, a German court gave him a one-year suspended prison sentence in connection with the case.

In February 2010, Faurecia acquired the US exhaust systems supplier Emcon Technologies. It sold its Automotive Exteriors business to Plastic Omnium in July 2016 for an enterprise value of €665 million. In March 2019, it completed the purchase of the Japanese automotive electronics manufacturer Clarion, which became part of its new Faurecia Clarion Electronics division.

In March 2021, Stellantis passed its stake in Faurecia to its shareholders. The holding had previously belonged to PSA Peugeot Citroën.

On 31 January 2022, Faurecia acquired a controlling stake in the German automotive supplier Hella. The two companies adopted Forvia as their shared group name the following month but remained separate legal entities. Faurecia SE changed its name to Forvia SE in May 2023.

In May 2024, Forvia signed a five-year agreement worth approximately €45 million with L&T Technology Services for engineering work in its Clean Mobility division. Around 300 engineers at Forvia's sites in Augsburg, Germany, and Bengaluru, India, transferred to L&T Technology Services under the agreement.

== Operations ==
Forvia makes automotive seats, exhaust-treatment systems, lighting and electronics. Hella also supplies spare parts and equipment for vehicle workshops. In April 2026, Forvia agreed to sell its Interiors business to Apollo-managed funds.

The group reported 246 industrial sites and 73 research and development centres in 40 countries in 2025. Europe, the Middle East and Africa generated 48% of sales; the Americas and Asia each accounted for 26%.

In France, Forvia develops seats at Brières-les-Scellés and hydrogen-storage systems at Bavans. The hydrogen systems are manufactured at nearby Allenjoie. Seating engineers also work at the group's North American headquarters in Auburn Hills, Michigan. In India, engineering teams support the seating, interiors, emissions-control, electronics and lighting businesses.

In Mexico, Clarion has a factory and development centre in San Juan del Río that produces displays, radios and reversing cameras. Forvia's Nýřany factory, near Plzeň in the Czech Republic, assembles complete seats for BMW, Volkswagen and Mercedes-Benz plants in Germany. Its Moroccan factories include sites in Kénitra and Salé. The Salé plant opened in 2024 and makes fabric and leather seat covers.

Hella has lighting and electronics research laboratories in Lippstadt, Germany, and an innovation centre in Shanghai. Its Chinese factories include Shanghai Electronics and Jiaxing Lighting, which it describes respectively as its largest electronics plant worldwide and largest lighting plant in Asia. Hella also develops and manufactures lighting and electronic systems in Mexico.

In the Czech Republic, Hella develops automotive lighting systems in Mohelnice and Ostrava. The Mohelnice team is responsible for rear-lamp electronics development worldwide and also designs and builds assembly lines for other Hella factories.
